= Scientific International Research in Unique Terrestrial Station =

Experiment(s)

Scientific International Research in Unique Terrestrial Station (SIRIUS) is a series of experiments that investigate the effects of isolation and simulates a flight to the Moon at the Institute of Biomedical Problems (IBMP) in Moscow, Russia. The first of the series started in 2017, followed by a 2019 122-day experiment and an eight-month experiment in 2021.

== SIRIUS-17 ==
7-24 November 2017. The first of the series of joint Russian-US SIRIUS experiments in which NASA's Human Research Program and IBMP conducted research to identify preventive measures and technologies to protect the health of astronauts during spaceflight, it lasted 17 days. The 6 person crew conducted over 60 experiments, "captured" satellites using a manipulator arm and controlled a rover on the Moon's surface. One experiment consisted of 38-hours of sleep deprivation, during which crew members had to perform a manual VR-simulated docking of the planned Orel spacecraft with a booster rocket in Earth's orbit.

=== Crew ===
- Mark Serov, mission commander, Russian. Former test cosmonaut, selected 2003 (RKKE-13) and an employee of RKK Energia, married to Yelena Serova.
- Anna Kikina, first flight engineer, Russian. Former cosmonaut.
- Ilya Rukavishnikov, crew doctor, Russian. IBMP staff.
- Elena Luchinskaya, Russian. Previously crew captain of the 8-day all-female "Luna 2015" mission.
- Viktor Fetter, flight engineer, German. Employee of Airbus Defense & Space.
- Natalia Lysova, researcher, Russian. IBMP staff.

== SIRIUS-19 ==
Commenced 19 March 2019 at the NEK ground based facility at IBMP. The crew will carry out over 80 experiments and halfway through there will be a simulated visit to the Moon, four crew members will "land on the lunar surface" in a small capsule and will carry out several "moonwalks" while wearing spacesuits, they will also collect samples and prepare a "settlement". Two members of the crew will remain behind in the simulated Lunar Gateway and monitor them. After the return and docking of the lander with the simulated Gateway, the whole crew will orbit the Moon for 30 days, remotely control rovers on the lunar surface, dock spaceships with the Orbital Platform, and carry out other experiments before their "return to Moscow". Participants in the study are the German Aerospace Center Deutsches Zentrum für Luft- und Raumfahrt (DLR) Space Administration and the French space agency (CNES), under the leadership of Roscosmos and NASA.

=== Crew ===
- Evgeny Tarelkin, crew commander, Russian.
- Daria Zhidova, flight engineer, Russian.
- Stephania Fedeye, crew doctor, Russian.
- Anastasia Stepanova, test researcher, Russian.
- Reinhold Povilaitis, test researcher, an American analyst of research and operations on NASA's Lunar Reconnaissance Orbiter (LRO) mission.
- Allen Mirkadyrov, test researcher, an American that works in the Telecommunication Networks and Technologies Branch at NASA's Goddard Space Flight Center in Greenbelt, Maryland.

== SIRIUS 20/21 ==
In 2021 six participants (Oleg Blinov, Victoria Kirichenko and Ekaterina Krayakina from Russia, William Brown and Ashley Kowalski from the US and Abdalla AlHammadi from the UAE) conducted an eight month stay.

== See also ==
- Mars 500
- NASA Exploration Atmosphere
- HI-SEAS
- Space Analog for the Moon and Mars
- MDRS
