= Statue of Jan Olszewski =

Monument in Warsaw, Poland

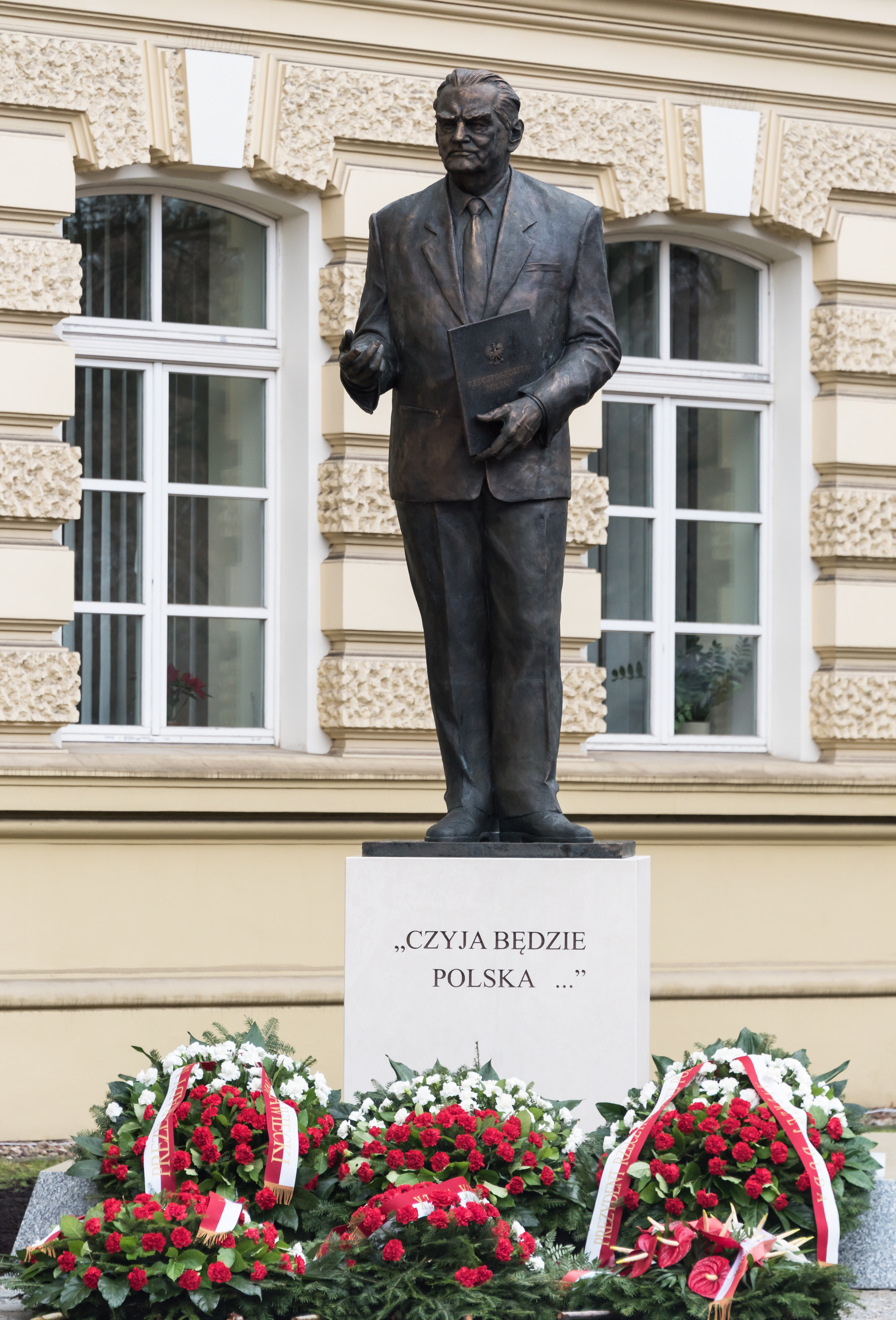
- The monument in 2022.
- Interactive map of Statue of Jan Olszewski
- Location: 1 and 3 Ujazdów Avenue, Downtown, Warsaw, Poland
- Coordinates: 52°13′06.9″N 21°01′32.4″E
- Type: Statue
- Material: Bronze
- Opening date: 21 December 2022
- Dedicated to: Jan Olszewski

The statue of Jan Olszewski (Polish: Pomnik Jana Olszewskiego) is a bronze statue in Warsaw, Poland, placed in front of the Building of the Chancellery of the Prime Minister at 1 and 3 Ujazdów Avenue, within the neighbourhood of Ujazdów in the Downtown district. It is dedicated to Jan Olszewski, a lawyer and politician, who was the Prime Minister of Poland from 1991 to 1992. It was unveiled on 21 December 2022.

== History ==
The construction of the monument was approved by the Warsaw City Council in February 2019, shortly after the death of Jan Olszewski, the Prime Minister of Poland from 1991 to 1992.

The ceremony of laying the cornerstone was held on 4 June 2019, on the 27th anniversary of the disbandment of the Olszewski's cabinet. It was attended by numerous government officials, including Mateusz Morawiecki, the Prime Minister of Poland, Piotr Gliński, the deputy prime minister, Julia Przyłębska, the head of the Constitutional Tribunal, and Jarosław Kaczyński, the leader of the Law and Justice party.

The monument was unveiled on 21 December 2022, in front of the Building of the Chancellery of the Prime Minister. The ceremony was attended by Mateusz Morawiecki, the Prime Minister, Elżbieta Witek, the Marshal of the Sejm, and other government officials.

== Design ==
The monument consists of a bronze statue of Jan Olszewski wearing a suit. It is placed on a pedestal, inscribed with a Polish text which reads "Czyja będzie Polska …", a quote by Olszewski. It translates to "To whom shall Poland belong …".
