= MARS-500 =

Psychosocial isolation experiment in spaceflight research

The mission's official logo

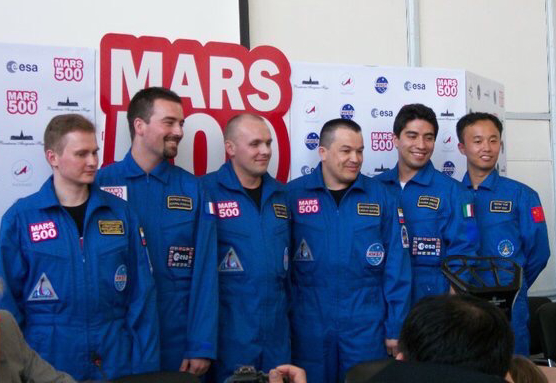
Crew of the 520-day simulation before starting the mission

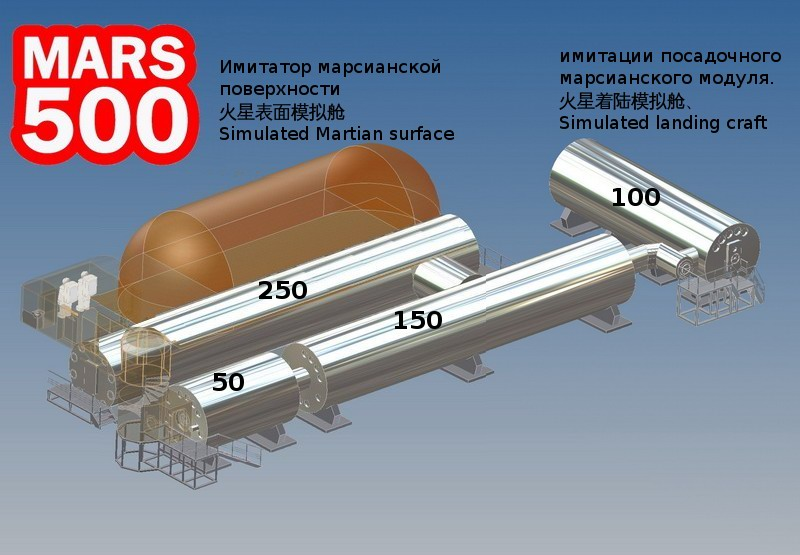
A three-dimensional plan of the Russia-based MARS-500 complex, used for ground-based experiments, which complement ISS-based preparations for a human mission to Mars

The MARS-500 mission was an isolation experiment conducted between 2007 and 2011 by Russia, the European Space Agency, and China, in preparation for an unspecified future crewed spaceflight to the planet Mars. The experiment's facility was located at the Russian Academy of Sciences' Institute of Biomedical Problems (IBMP) in Moscow, Russia.

Between 2007 and 2011, three different crews of volunteers lived and worked in a mock-up spacecraft at IBMP. The final stage of the experiment, which was intended to simulate a 520-day crewed mission, was conducted by an all-male crew consisting of three Russians (Alexey Sitev, Sukhrob Kamolov, Alexander Smoleevskij), a Frenchman (Romain Charles), an Italian (Diego Urbina), and a Chinese citizen (Yue Wang). The mock-up facility simulated an Earth-Mars shuttle spacecraft, an ascent-descent craft, and the Martian surface. The volunteers who participated in the three stages included professionals with experience in engineering, medicine, biology, and human spaceflight. The experiment yielded important data on the physiological, social, and psychological effects of long-term, close-quarters isolation.

== Project overview ==
=== Purpose ===
MARS-500 was intended to study the psychological, physiological, and technological challenges inherent to long-duration space flight. Among other hurdles to overcome, the experiment examined the physiological effects of long-term weightlessness, the effectiveness of resource management, and the effects of isolation in a hermetically sealed environment. MARS-500's communication systems were designed with an average delay of 13 min, to simulate the actual transmission time to and from a Mars-bound spacecraft.

=== Scientific objectives ===
The scientific goals of MARS-500 included the study of potential habitat designs, with a particular focus on medical and psychological support for the crew (who would necessarily be confined in a relatively small spacecraft, with relatively limited medical facilities, for the 7- to 9-month journey to Mars).

=== Experiment stages ===
In total, 640 experiment days were scheduled between 2007 and 2011, divided into three stages of differing length. During each stage, the crew of volunteers lived and worked in a mockup spacecraft. Communication with the outside world was limited, and was conducted with a realistic time delay of up to 25 minutes, to simulate the real-life communications lag between Mars and Earth. Similarly, a realistically limited supply of on-board consumables was provided for the volunteers. Some conditions, such as weightlessness and cosmic radiation, could not be simulated.

The first 15-day stage of the MARS-500 experiment took place from 15 November 2007 to 27 November 2007. The purpose of this stage was to test the technical equipment, facilities, and operating procedures for the voyage.

The second, 105-day stage of the experiment began on 31 March 2009, when six volunteers started living in the experiment's isolated living complex. On 14 July 2009, this stage of the experiment was completed.

The 520-day final stage of the experiment, which was intended to simulate a full-length crewed mission, began on 3 June 2010 and ended on 4 November 2011. This stage was conducted by a six-man international crew, consisting of three Russians, a Frenchman, an Italian-Colombian, and a Chinese citizen. The stage included a simulation of a crewed Mars landing, with three simulated Mars walks carried out on 14, 18, and 22 February 2011. The experiment ended on 4 November 2011, with all the participants reportedly in optimal physical and psychological condition.

In February 2013, the Proceedings of the National Academy of Sciences reported that four of the six crew members had considerable problems sleeping, and increased sleep and rest times, in behaviour compared to animal hibernation. Participants also experienced a disruption to their circadian rhythm during confinement.

== Facility ==
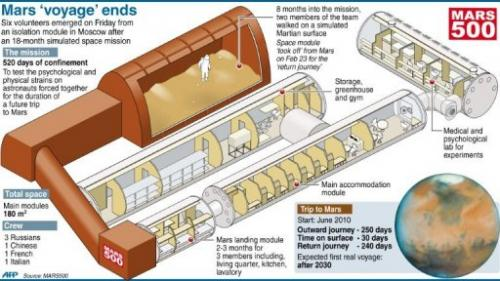

The experiment facility was located on the Institute of Biomedical Problems' site in Moscow. The complex consisted of the isolation facility, the mission operations room, technical facilities, and offices.

The isolation facility consisted of five different modules. Three – the habitat, utility, and medical modules – simulated the main spacecraft. The fourth module simulated the Martian lander and was connected to the main spacecraft. The fifth module was a simulator of the Martian surface, and is connected to the Martian lander. The combined volume of the modules was 550 m^{3} (19,000 cu ft).

The facility included all the necessary equipment for running the experiment. These included communications and control systems, ventilation systems, air and water supplies, electrical installations, sewage systems, air- and water-quality monitoring and partial recycling systems, medical equipment, fire and other safety monitoring systems, and emergency equipment. The modules were maintained at Earth-normal barometric pressure.

=== Habitable module ===
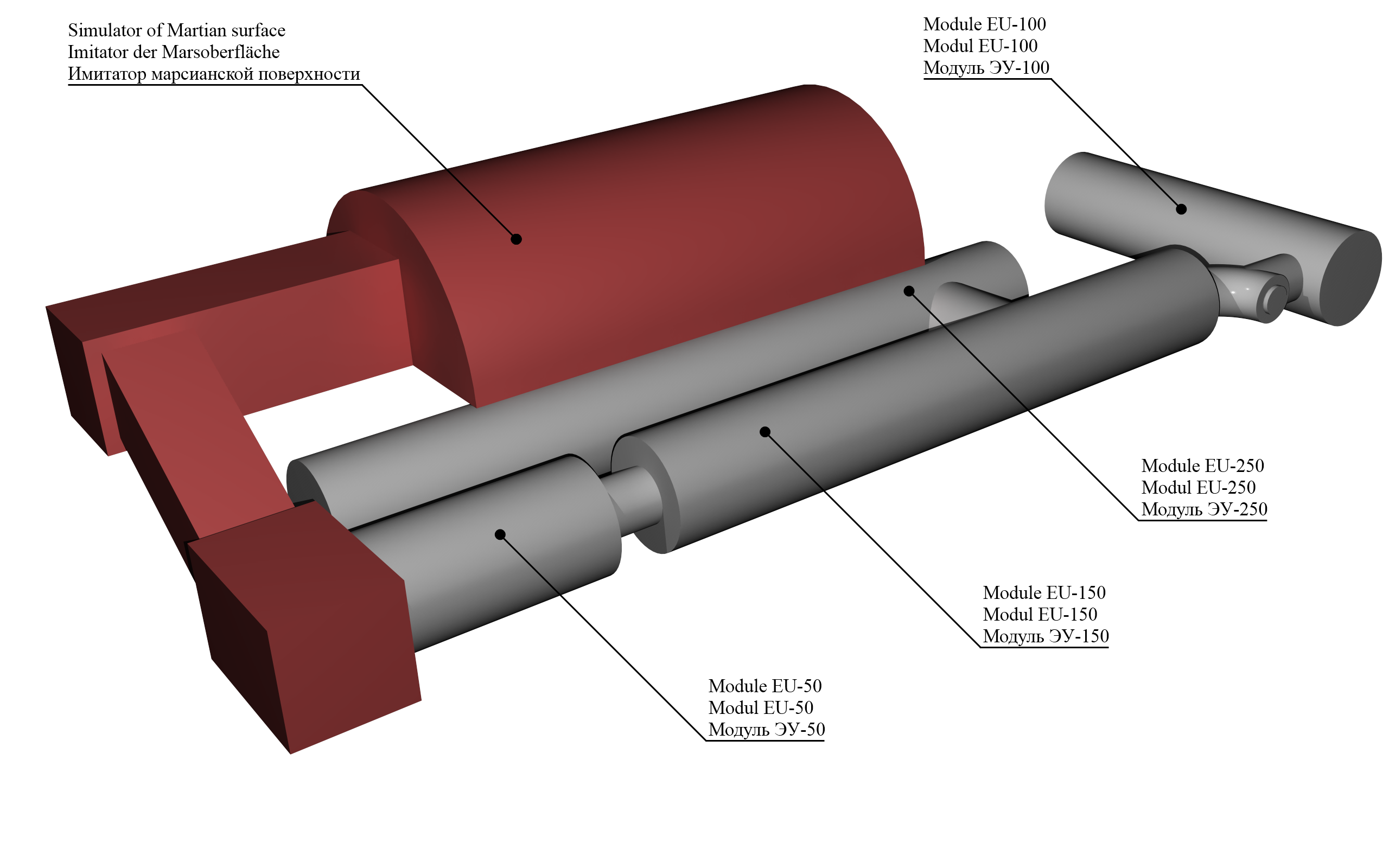
A labelled diagram of the experimental isolation facility

The habitable module was the main living quarters for the crew. The cylindrical 3.6 m × 20 m (12 ft × 66 ft) module consisted of six individual crew compartments, a kitchen/dining room, a living room, the main control room, and a toilet. The individual bedroom compartments, which had an area around 3 m^{2} (32 sq ft) each, contained a bed, a desk, a chair, and shelves for personal belongings.

=== Medical module ===
Overhead plan of the experimental complex

The cylindrical medical module measured 3.2 m × 11.9 m (10 ft × 39 ft) and housed two medical berths, a toilet, and equipment for routine medical examinations. It also contained equipment for telemedical, laboratory, and diagnostic investigations. Had crew members become ill, they would have been isolated and treated in the module.

=== Mars landing module simulator ===
The Mars landing module simulator was only used during the 30-day "Mars-orbiting" phase of the experiment. The 6.3 m × 6.17 m (20.7 ft × 20.2 ft) cylindrical module accommodated up to three crew members, and had three bunk beds, two workstations, and a toilet. Its ancillary systems included a control and data-collection system, a video control and communications system, a gas analysis system, an air-conditioning and ventilation system, a sewage system and water supply, and a fire-suppression system.

=== Storage module ===
The cylindrical 3.9 m × 24 m (13 ft × 79 ft) storage module was divided into four compartments:

1. A refrigerated compartment for food storage
2. A compartment for storage of nonperishable food
3. An experimental greenhouse
4. A compartment containing a bathroom, sauna, and gym

== Crew ==
=== Advertised volunteer requirements ===
The MARS-500 project posted a number of basic requirements for any potential candidates. These were:

1. Age: 25–50 years old
2. Higher education
3. Professional requirements:
  - general practitioner having skills of medical first aid
  - physician-investigator having skills of clinical laboratory diagnostics
  - biologist
  - engineer – specialist in life support systems
  - engineer – specialist in computer science
  - engineer – specialist in electronics
  - engineer – mechanic
4. Language skills: knowledge of the Russian and English languages at a professional level

=== Crew of the first stage ===
The crew of the first 15-day stage of the isolation experiment was composed of six Russians: five men and a woman. This stage of the experiment was conducted in November 2007.

- Anton Artamonov (born 1982), engineer, physicist and programmer
- Oleg Artemyev (born 1970), engineer and cosmonaut
- Alexander Kovalev (born 1982), engineer employed by IBMP's telemedicine laboratory
- Dmitry Perfilov (born 1975), anesthesiologist employed by IBMP's telemedicine laboratory
- Sergey Ryazansky (born 1974), crew commander, physiologist and cosmonaut
- Marina Tugusheva (born 1983), biologist, IBMP researcher

Marina Tugusheva, the only woman of the crew, was excluded from the longer missions.

=== Crew of the second stage ===
The 105-day second stage involved a crew of six members, and ended on 14 July 2009.

- Oleg Artemyev, Russian cosmonaut
- Alexei Baranov, Russian medical doctor
- Cyrille Fournier, French airline pilot
- Oliver Knickel, mechanical engineer in the German Army
- Sergey Ryazansky (commander), Russian cosmonaut
- Alexei Shpakov, Russian sports physiologist

=== Crew of the third stage ===
More than 6,000 people from 40 countries applied for the 520-day third stage of the experiment. The selected volunteers were three Russians, two Europeans, and one Chinese. They had a varying command of English, but not all spoke Russian.

- Romain Charles, 31-year-old French engineer
- Sukhrob Rustamovich Kamolov (Сухроб Рустамович Камолов), Russian surgeon
- Alexey Sergeyevich Sitev (Алексей Сергеевич Ситёв), Russian engineer and commander of the mission
- Alexandr Egorovich Smoleevskiy (Александр Егорович Смолеевский), Russian physiologist
- Diego Urbina, 27-year-old Italian-Colombian engineer
- Wang Yue (王跃), 27-year-old Chinese instructor at the China Astronaut Research and Training Center

The other member of the crew, a replacement, was Mikhail Sinelnikov (Михаил Олегович Синельников), a 37-year-old Russian engineer. The mission started on 3 June 2010 and concluded on 4 November 2011, whereupon the participants entered a four-day quarantine before leaving the facility.

== Satellite experiments ==
During the MARS-500 experiment, related additional experiments aimed at studying the effects of radiation, health problems associated with weightlessness, the impact of fire on board the spacecraft, and others were conducted.

=== Cardiac experiments ===
Crew experiments included monthly operational research, consisting of recording electrocardiogram, respiratory samples and blood pressure, and a questionnaire about lifestyle, stress, and possible complaints over the past month.

Quarterly dynamic complex studies included measurement and recording of blood pressure and complex cardiorespiratory parameters during the performance of functional tests with physical, mental, and orthostatic load. Detailed questionnaires conducting psychological testing and standard outpatient dispensary studies were conducted before and after the series of studies.

=== Immersion experiments ===
Because of the long stay in weightlessness, a person gets hypokinetic disorders. To study this phenomenon, IBMP has been conducting research in this area for many years, which has allowed construction of a detailed picture of the cause of hypokinetic disorders. Experimental results show the main cause of violations to be a change in the gravity-dependent mechanisms that are responsible for motoric activity under the influence of gravity on the body. The changes begin to occur because of the disruption of coordinated work by sensory systems, in particular skeletal support and proprioceptive ones. Data obtained during the experiments suggest that the support afferentation in humans acts as a mechanism of activation and regulation of activity of the postural-tonic system, and that the lack of skeletal support is the reason for discharge of the physiological and morphological changes that are common in conditions of weightlessness and microgravity.

The main purpose of immersion experiments was to study potential effects of the flight (including unloading) on the support mechanisms of the body (spinal, supraspinal), on the state of the central nervous systems, and on motor function and hand-eye co-ordination.

=== Hyperbaric experiments ===
During the flight, a risk of fire in the spacecraft existed, and argon is planned as an inhibitor in the spacecraft's atmosphere to reduce this risk. The use of argon can significantly reduce the concentration of oxygen in the atmosphere of a spacecraft without any harm to the crew and to create a so-called hypoxic environment. Hyperbaric experiments complement the knowledge on the effect of fire-resistant oxygen-nitrogen-argon mixture on the human body with the help of an integrated assessment of the subject's body during a long stay in fire-resistant mixture. The tests were to determine the level of mental and physical performance, assess the state of the cardiorespiratory system, hematological, metabolic and immunological parameters in blood, and conduct microbiological research and research that will improve existing support systems.

=== Radiological experiments ===
To avoid health problems caused by irradiation during the flight to Mars, creating a prediction model of radiation risk is needed. The model should describe the risk of radiation sickness depending on the total dose received, decreased performance which causes an acute reaction, and the possible reduction of the overall immune system resistance to the other health risks of interplanetary flight.

The prediction model is created by exposing a group of monkeys to a radiation source (caesium-137). Radiological experiments are then conducted to study the radiobiological reactions of the main regulatory body systems (nervous, endocrine, immune, cardiovascular, hematopoietic), and spermatozoa and cytogenetic response to irradiation and analysis of long-term effects of exposure (life expectancy and carcinogenesis). The experiment uses male rhesus macaque aged 3–5 years. They are divided into groups of 10–15 monkeys in each group. The experiments were designed so that they mimic the real exposure of crew during the flight to Mars, including acute and chronic phases of disease.

=== Study of gastrointestinal tract ===
Among the biological and medical studies of MARS-500, the crew underwent a 24-hour electrogastroenterography, using on-board medical equipment, to study the electrical activity in the human gastrointestinal tract.

== Psychological effects ==
According to official results, the crew of 520-day isolation underwent the trial as a single unit. No interpersonal conflicts were noted, nor were any situations that would require interrupting or delaying any aspect of the project. The difficulties encountered during the performance of some complicated activities were overcome by the crew together. Cultural differences and language difficulties did not bear any significant influence. Friendly and constructive communication is said to have prevailed throughout the experiment. The crew spent time together, watching films in different languages, and used such recreational activities as an opportunity to discuss the films and interact socially.

The crew prepared surprises for birthdays, major state holidays, and informal holidays (on 31 October, they celebrated Halloween). Some crew members increased the time spent on individual activities, which did not hamper communication or interaction. No language, social, or cultural barriers were observed, and the mission commander exercised his authority as both a formal and informal leader.

Later in the experiment, the crew spent more time in bed or engaged in personal activity. The crew's overall activity levels plummeted in the first three months, and continued to fall for the next year. On their return journey, they spent 700 hours more in bed than on the outward journey. Four of the members suffered from sleep and psychological issues. One crew member slept very badly, suffered chronic sleep deprivation, and accounted for the majority of mistakes made on a computer test used to measure concentration and alertness.

== See also ==
- Colonization of Mars
- Human mission to Mars
- Mars Society
- Mars to Stay
- HI-SEAS
- Scientific International Research in Unique Terrestrial Station
