= Musiał =

Musiał or Musial (Polish pronunciation: [ˈmuɕaw], plural: Musiałowie) is a Polish surname meaning "he had to" (Musiał) or "she had to" (Musiała), from the past tense of the Polish word musieć. An equivalent surname in Czech is Musil. Notable people with this surname include:

- Adam Musiał (1948–2020), Polish football player and manager
- Bogdan Musiał (born 1960), Polish historian
- Maciej Musiał (born 1977), Polish football manager
- Maciej Musiał (born 1952), Polish politician
- Maciej Musiał (born 1995), Polish actor
- Mariusz Musial (born 1978), Norwegian athlete
- Stan Musial (1920–2013), American baseball player
- Stanisław Musiał (1938–2004), Polish writer
- Władysław Musiał, Polish football player
- Joe Musial (1905–1977), American cartoonist
- Jamal Musiala (born 2003), German footballer

== See also ==
- Musil
- Musiol
