= Musil =

Musil (feminine Musilová) is a Czech surname, which means "he had to", from the past tense of the Czech word musit (must). The equivalent surname in Polish is Musiał, also spelled Musial. Notable people include:

- Adam Musil (born 1997), Czech ice hockey player
- Alois Musil (1868–1944), Czech explorer and writer
- Bartolo Musil (born 1974), Austrian musician
- Bohumil Musil (1922–1999), Czech football player and coach
- Cyril Musil (1907–1977), Czech skier
- David Musil (born 1993), Czech ice hockey player
- Donna Musil (born 1960), American filmmaker
- Frank Musil (born 1964), Czech ice hockey player and coach
- Jaromír Musil (born 1988), Czech judoka
- Josef Musil (1932–2017), Czech volleyball player
- Michaela Musilová (born 1989), Czech sport shooter
- Miroslav Musil (born 1950), Czech wrestler
- Pavel Musil (born 1992), Czech ice hockey player
- Petr Musil (born 1981), Czech football player
- Robert Musil (1880–1942), Austrian writer
- Roman Musil (born 1970), Czech athlete
- Šárka Musilová (born 1991), Czech Paralympic archer

== See also ==
- Musiał
- Musiol
