= Musiol =

Musiol is a surname. Notable people with the surname include:

- Bogdan Musioł (born 1957), Polish-born East German and German bobsledder
- Daniel Musiol (born 1983), German cyclist
- Joseph Musiol (1865–?), Silesian politician
- Julian Musiol (born 1986), German ski jumper
- Marie-Jeanne Musiol (born 1950), Canadian photographer
- Waldemar Musioł (born 1976), Polish Roman Catholic bishop
- Zbyněk Musiol (born 1991), Czech footballer

== See also ==
- Musiał, surname
- Musil, surname
