= Chancellery of the Prime Minister of Poland =

Chancellery of the Prime Minister of the Republic of Poland
- Kancelaria Prezesa Rady Ministrów; Rzeczypospolitej Polskiej

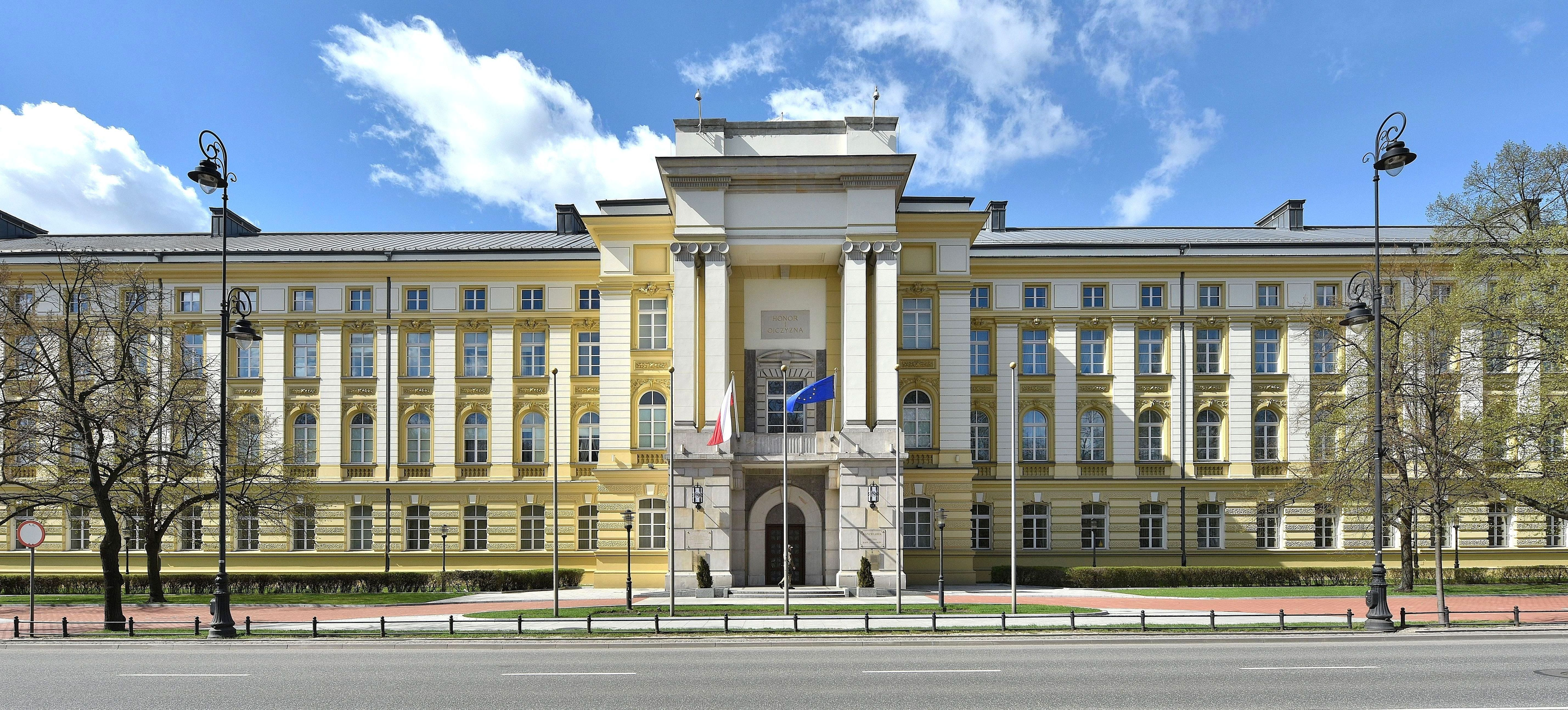
- The Chancellery building, located along Ujazdów Avenue in Śródmieście, Warsaw

Agency overview
- Formed: 1997
- Preceding agency: Office of the Council of Ministers
- Jurisdiction: Government of Poland
- Headquarters: Building of the Chancellery of the Prime Minister, Al. Ujazdowskie 1/3, Śródmieście, Warsaw; 52°12′56″N 21°01′28″E
- Agency executive: Jan Grabiec, Chief of the Chancellery
- Website: https://www.premier.gov.pl

The Chancellery of the Prime Minister of Poland (Polish: Kancelaria Prezesa Rady Ministrów - lit. Chancellery of the President of the Council of Ministers), or KPRM, is the executive office for the Prime Minister of Poland. Created under the administrative reorganization reforms by the government of Włodzimierz Cimoszewicz in 1996 and implemented in the following year, the Chancellery assumed many responsibilities of the previous Office of the Council of Ministers (Urząd Rady Ministrów). In addition to serving as the premier's office, the Chancellery oversees the technical, legislative, legal and organizational support for the Prime Minister, Deputy Prime Minister and the Council of Ministers. The current Chief of the Chancellery is Jan Grabiec.

The Chancellery headquartered at the Building of the Chancellery of the Prime Minister situated along Ujazdów Avenue in the Śródmieście borough of Warsaw.

== History ==
The evolution of the executive support staff of the Prime Minister and the cabinet pertains to four distinct eras:

- 1918–1939: The Presidium of the Council of Ministers (Prezydium Rady Ministrów) assisted the upper tier bureaucracy of the Second Polish Republic. The Presidium continued its functions until the Invasion of Poland in September 1939 forced the government into exile.
- 1945–1952: The Presidium of the Council of Ministers is revived following the end of the Second World War. After 1948, the Presidium's decision-making comes increasingly under the control of the Polish United Workers' Party (PZPR).
- 1952–1996: The Office of the Council of Ministers (Urząd Rady Ministrów) or URM, is created by the PZPR, with Kazimierz Mijal as its first chief minister following the proclamation of the People's Republic of Poland with the Constitution of 1952. The URM acts under the shadow of the ruling PZPR following the abolition of the presidency and the consolidation of the one-party state. The Office of the Council of Ministers remained a facet of Polish political culture following the dissolution of the communist state with the events of 1989 and 1990.
- 1997–present: Administrative reforms acts passed under Prime Minister Włodzimierz Cimoszewicz transform the URM into the current Chancellery at the start of 1997. Under the new Chancellery, support staff and executive services are increasingly consolidated to serve the Prime Minister rather than other members of the government as a whole.

== Role in administration ==
As the executive office and support staff for the Prime Minister and the Council of Ministers, the Chancellery serves to articulate and present cabinet positions on matters, streamline communication between the Prime Minister and the cabinet, and coordinate executive affairs. Beginning with the start of each year (or half year periods), the chief of the Chancellery communicates to all members of the cabinet to present an agenda, while also indicating the government's goals for the coming period. Once a legislative work agenda is introduced into the cabinet, the Chancellery proceeds to scrutinize ministerial drafts for compliance in both substance and timing. Chancellery support staff include the office's chief, a minister within the cabinet, and a range of secretaries of state (Sekretarz stanu) and undersecretaries of the state (Podsekretarz stanu) holding positions for various policy agendas delegated by the Prime Minister.

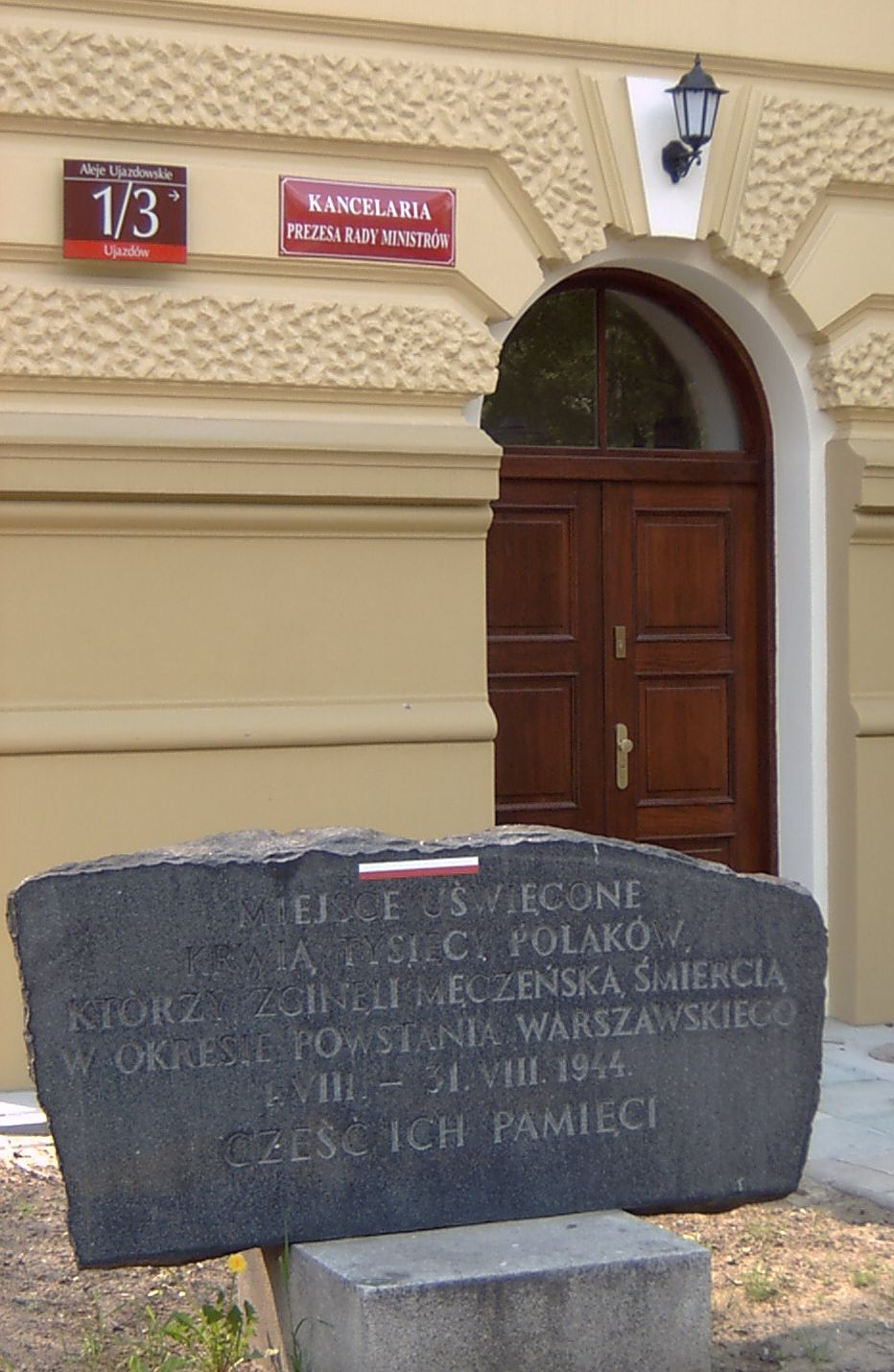
A memorial outside of the Chancellery's entrance.

In addition to acting as the coordinator of executive and ministerial affairs, the Chancellery building also acts as the location for cabinet meetings every Tuesday, with the Prime Minister chairing the Council of Ministers. In addition, the Prime Minister and the office's support staff meet visiting foreign and domestic delegations within the Chancellery.

Organizational Structure of the Office of the Prime Minister:

- The Secretariat of the Prime Minister
- Government Information Centre
- Department of Strategic Analysis
- Department of the Council of Ministers
- Department of Control and Supervision
- Department of the Legal
- Department of the Council of Ministers
- Department of Civil Affairs
- Department of Civil Service
- Department of Programming and Impact Assessment
- Department of Foreign Affairs
- Office of Budget and Financial
- Office of the Director-General
- College Office for Special Services
- Office of the Plenipotentiary of the Prime Minister of the Council of Ministers for International Dialogue
- Office of the Government Plenipotentiary for Equal Treatment
- Protection Bureau

== List of Chiefs of the Chancellery ==
Portrait	Name (Born-Died)	Party	Term of Office		Prime Minister (Cabinet)
	Grzegorz Rydlewski (1953–)	Democratic Left Alliance	1 January 1997	31 October 1997	Włodzimierz Cimoszewicz (Cimoszewicz)
	Wiesław Walendziak (1962–)	Solidarity Electoral Action	31 October 1997	26 March 1999	Jerzy Buzek (Buzek)
	Jerzy Widzyk (1959–)	Solidarity Electoral Action	26 March 1999	12 June 2000	Jerzy Buzek (Buzek)
	Maciej Musiał (1952–)	Solidarity Electoral Action	12 June 2000	19 October 2001	Jerzy Buzek (Buzek)
	Marek Wagner (1946–)	Democratic Left Alliance	19 October 2001	2 May 2004	Leszek Miller (Miller)
	Slawomir Cytrycki (1951–)	Democratic Left Alliance	2 May 2004	31 October 2005	Marek Belka (Belka I-Belka II)
	Mariusz Błaszczak (1969–)	Law and Justice	31 October 2005	5 November 2007	Kazimierz Marcinkiewicz (Marcinkiewicz); Jarosław Kaczyński (Kaczyński)
	Tomasz Arabski (1968–)	Nonpartisan	16 November 2007	25 February 2013	Donald Tusk (Tusk I-Tusk II)
	Jacek Cichocki (1971–)	Nonpartisan	25 February 2013	16 November 2015	Donald Tusk (Tusk II); Ewa Kopacz (Kopacz)
	Beata Kempa (1966–)	United Poland	16 November 2015	18 December 2017	Beata Szydło (Szydło); Mateusz Morawiecki (Morawiecki)
	Michał Dworczyk (1975–)	Law and Justice	19 December 2017	13 October 2022	Mateusz Morawiecki (Morawiecki) (Morawiecki II)
	Marek Kuchciński (1955–)	Law and Justice	13 October 2022	27 November 2023	Mateusz Morawiecki (Morawiecki II)
	Izabela Antos	Nonpartisan	27 November 2023	13 December 2023	Mateusz Morawiecki (Morawiecki III)
	Jan Grabiec (1972–)	Civic Platform	13 December 2023	Present	Donald Tusk (Tusk III)

== The Chancellery building ==
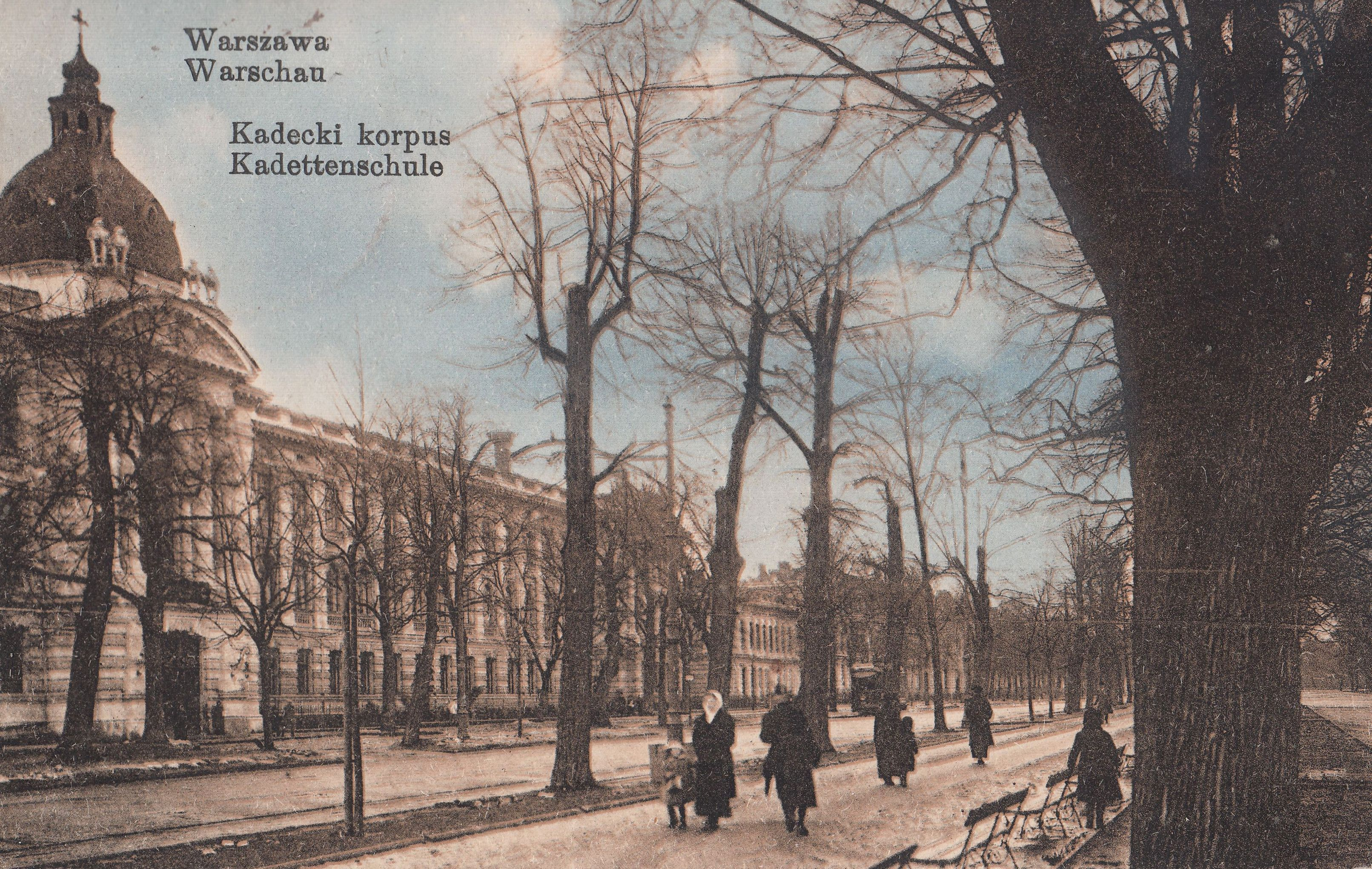
The building during the First World War

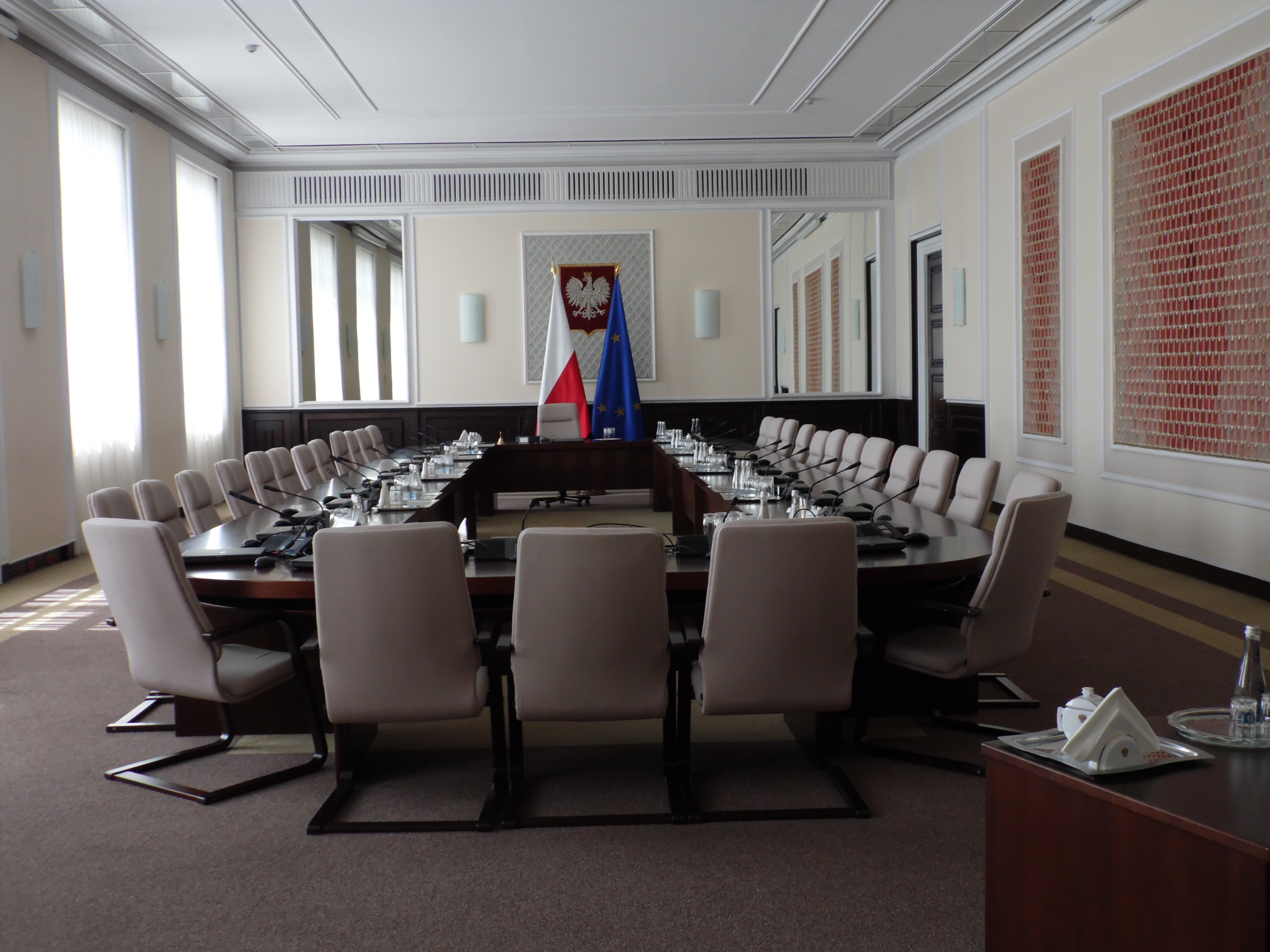
Andrzej Frycz Modrzejewski Hall

At its inception in 1997, the Chancellery took its offices in the neoclassical former Cadet Corps building along Ujazdów Avenue in central Warsaw. Built between 1900 and 1903 under Russian-controlled Congress Poland, the building originally provided the home to the Alexander Suvorov Cadet Corps of the Imperial Russian Army. At the outbreak of the First World War, the Cadet Corps building was transformed into a municipal hospital, and following the Russian retreat, a German Army hospital. Shortly following Poland regained its independence on 11 November 1918, troops from the Polish Infantry Academy in Ostrów Mazowiecka negotiated the withdrawal of German troops and medical patients out of the Cadet Corps building in return for safe passage out of the new republic. The building quickly came under the administration of the new Polish Army's Infantry Academy. During the 1926 May Coup, the Infantry Academy supported the government of President Stanisław Wojciechowski and Prime Minister Wincenty Witos against Marshal Józef Piłsudski. As a consequence, the victorious Piłsudski-influenced government forced the Infantry Academy to vacate the building's premises, beginning a two-year period of refurbishing the structure. The General Inspectorate of the Armed Forces moved into the structure in 1928; Piłsudski himself moved nearby to a connecting palace, living there until shortly before his death in 1935. At the start of the Second World War four years later, the southern wing of the building suffered damage during the Siege of Warsaw, with the structure's surviving floors and wings transforming into an SS barracks and its damaged southern portion into an execution ground during the Nazi occupation.

After the war's conclusion, the ushering in of the communist era brought extensive reconstruction, floor and room additions to the Cadet Corps building, lasting until 1948. From 1953 until the dissolution of the People's Republic of Poland, the building served as the home of the Office of the Council of Ministers; additional wings and floors of the structure were transformed into the ruling PZPR's social science academy, as well as the secretariat offices of the Prime Minister. The building served as the host to the historic Round Table Talks in 1989, signaling both an end to communist dominance in Poland and the fall of communism throughout the Eastern Bloc. In 1995, the former Cadet Corps building was entered into the registry of historic monuments within Warsaw Voivodeship for its architecture and unique role in the history of the republic. Since 1997, the building has served as the home of the Chancellery. Today, the building is considered one of the most politically important centers of decision-making in Poland.

== See also ==
- Chancellery of the President of the Republic of Poland
- Sejm
- Senat
- Government of Poland
