= Building of the Chancellery of the Prime Minister =

- Gmach Kancelarii Prezesa Rady Ministrów
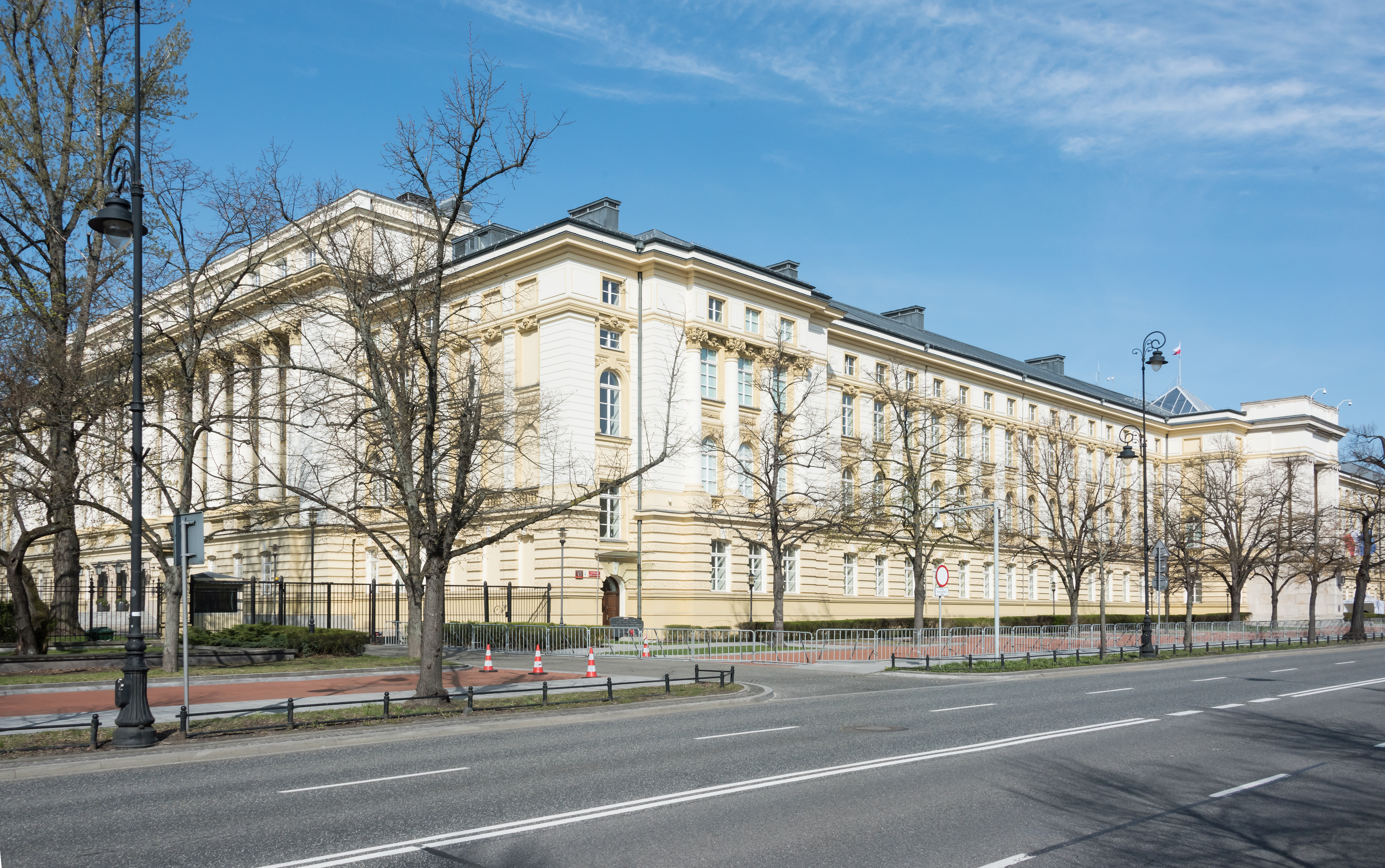
- Interactive map of the Building of the Chancellery of the Prime Minister area

General information
- Architectural style: Renaissance Revival
- Location: Aleje Ujazdowskie 1/3, Warsaw, Poland
- Construction started: 1900
- Completed: 1903 (remodeled in 1914 and expanded in 1926)
- Demolished: partially in 1939, restored in 1947-1948
- Client: Cadet Corps
- Owner: Government of Poland

Design and construction
- Architects: Wiktor Junosza-Piotrowski, Stefan Szyller

The building of the Chancellery of the Prime Minister (Polish: Gmach Kancelarii Prezesa Rady Ministrów or Gmach KPRM) is a building located at Ujazdów Avenue 1/3 in Warsaw, the seat of the Chancellery of the Prime Minister of Poland. It was originally built in 1900 for the purpose of the Cadet Corps. At the outbreak of World War I, in 1914, it was turned into a hospital and remodeled in the neo-Renaissance style by Stefan Szyller. In independent Poland, after another thorough makeover of the building in 1926, it became the seat of the Polish Infantry Cadets School. After the end of World War II, the building housed the seat of the State Council of Polish People's Republic and the Office of the Council of Ministers, which moved there from the current Presidential Palace in 1953.

== History ==
In 1900, on the territory belonging to the Treasury of the Russian Empire, the construction of a complex of barracks of the Cadet Corps named after Alexander Suvorov. The building was located in the place where the Lithuanian Lejbgwardia Regiment was stationed. The building was designed by Wiktor Junosza-Piotrowski, and construction works were carried out under the supervision of Henryk Julian Gay. In November 1902, the church of the Protection of the Mother of God located there was consecrated. The work was completed in 1903. Along Ujazdów Avenue, from today's ul. Trifle to Na Rozdrożu Square, less representative barracks buildings were built.

In 1914, after the outbreak of World War I, the building was rebuilt in the Neo-Renaissance style, designed by Stefan Shiller, for the purpose of a municipal hospital. It had 9 surgical wards and 2 internal wards for sick and wounded soldiers, as well as a 50-bed ward for officers. The lazaret was later enlarged to 1,750 and then 1,950 beds.

As a result of the offensive of the Imperial German Army and the Great Retreat of the Imperial Russian Army, the city was occupied by the Germans, and the complex of buildings was transformed into the fortress military hospital Festungslazarett N.1. The hospital operated until November 1918 when Poland gained independence. After negotiations with the hospital's Soldiers' Council, undertaken by officers of the Polish School of Infantry Cadets from Ostrów Mazowiecka, of the newly formed Polish Armed Forces the facility was taken over without a fight in exchange for facilitating the evacuation of sick and wounded German soldiers to their homeland. On November 20, the Infantry Cadets School took over the building.

During the May Coup in 1926, the battalion of the Infantry Cadet School sided with the legal government. After the revolution, in September 1926, the school was moved to its previous seat in Ostrów Mazowiecka. Renovation of the building began, during which the middle wing was added. The building acquired the shape of the letter E, preserved to this day. In 1928, the headquarters of the General Inspectorate of the Armed Forces, headed by Marshal Józef Piłsudski, was moved here. The southern wing, from the side of the garden and Bagatela street occupied the collections of the Central Military Library and the resources of the Polish Museum in Rapperswil. After being transported to Poland, the exhibits were deposited here until the construction of the New Building of the National Museum in Warsaw.

In September 1939, during the siege of Warsaw, the building was bombed. The Central Military Library and the collection of the Rapperswil Library burned down. The ground floor of the building and the northern wing were occupied by the SS barracks. During the Warsaw Uprising, the ruined southern wing, together with the adjacent Jordan garden, became the place of execution of thousands of Warsaw residents, whose corpses were burned in the building's boiler room.

Following the establishment of the Polish People's Republic the rebuilt and expanded building was put into use in 1949. The building was extended by one floor in 1947-1948 according to the design of Zygmunt Odyniec-Dobrowolski. Above the central part, a Column Hall was built, accommodating 1,000 people, the main entrance with columns was placed in front of the building. Since the building was intended as the seat of the State Council of the Polish People's Republic, the main hall, the staircase leading to the first floor and some rooms gained a representative character. The main portico was designed by Franciszek Krzywda-Polkowski, the interior by Jan Bogusławski, the sculptures by Stanisław Sikora, and the wrought iron and bronze details by Henryk Grunwald. The interior and furnishings were partly completed (paintings by Bohdan Urbanowicz). The rebuilt building was awarded the State Prize in 1949.

In the years 1953–1996, the building housed the Office of the Council of Ministers. At the same time, in the period from 1959 to 1989, the southern wing was occupied by the Higher School of Social Sciences, operating at the Central Committee of the Polish United Workers' Party. The school, renamed the Academy of Social Sciences in 1984, was a place of educating party cadres. As a result of the political changes, the party ceased to exist, and the university premises were occupied by the URM Main Library (3rd floor), the Government Press Office (currently the Government Information Center - 2nd floor) and the secretariats and office of the Prime Minister (1st floor).

In 2002, the law firm obtained permission to place the hallmark of the Hague Convention and a plaque informing about the historic nature of the buildings.

In November 2007, an unexploded ordnance was found in the building and removed. In 2014, a bust of Tadeusz Mazowiecki by Adam Myjak was unveiled in the building. In 2022, a monument to Jan Olszewski was unveiled at the main entrance.

In 1995, the main building and neighboring buildings were entered into the register of monuments as an example of Warsaw's representative architecture.

Since January 1997, the Chancellery of the Prime Minister has been operating in the main building. Weekly meetings of the Council of Ministers are held here on Tuesdays, and the building is also the prime minister's workplace. Official national and foreign delegations are received in the building.

The most architecturally interesting rooms of the Chancellery include: Kościuszko, Column, Obrazowa, Tadeusz Mazowiecki (former Świetlikowa), Andrzej Frycz Modrzewski and a glazed hall in front of the former Prime Minister's office on the first floor, connected to the representative rooms: Round Table, Reception and Clock. The Council of Ministers meets in the Frycz Modrzewski. The previous meeting place was the Skylight Hall. Official ceremonies are held in the Picture Room.

The office of the Prime Minister is located on the first floor in the southern wing (on the side of Bagatela Street).

== Gallery ==
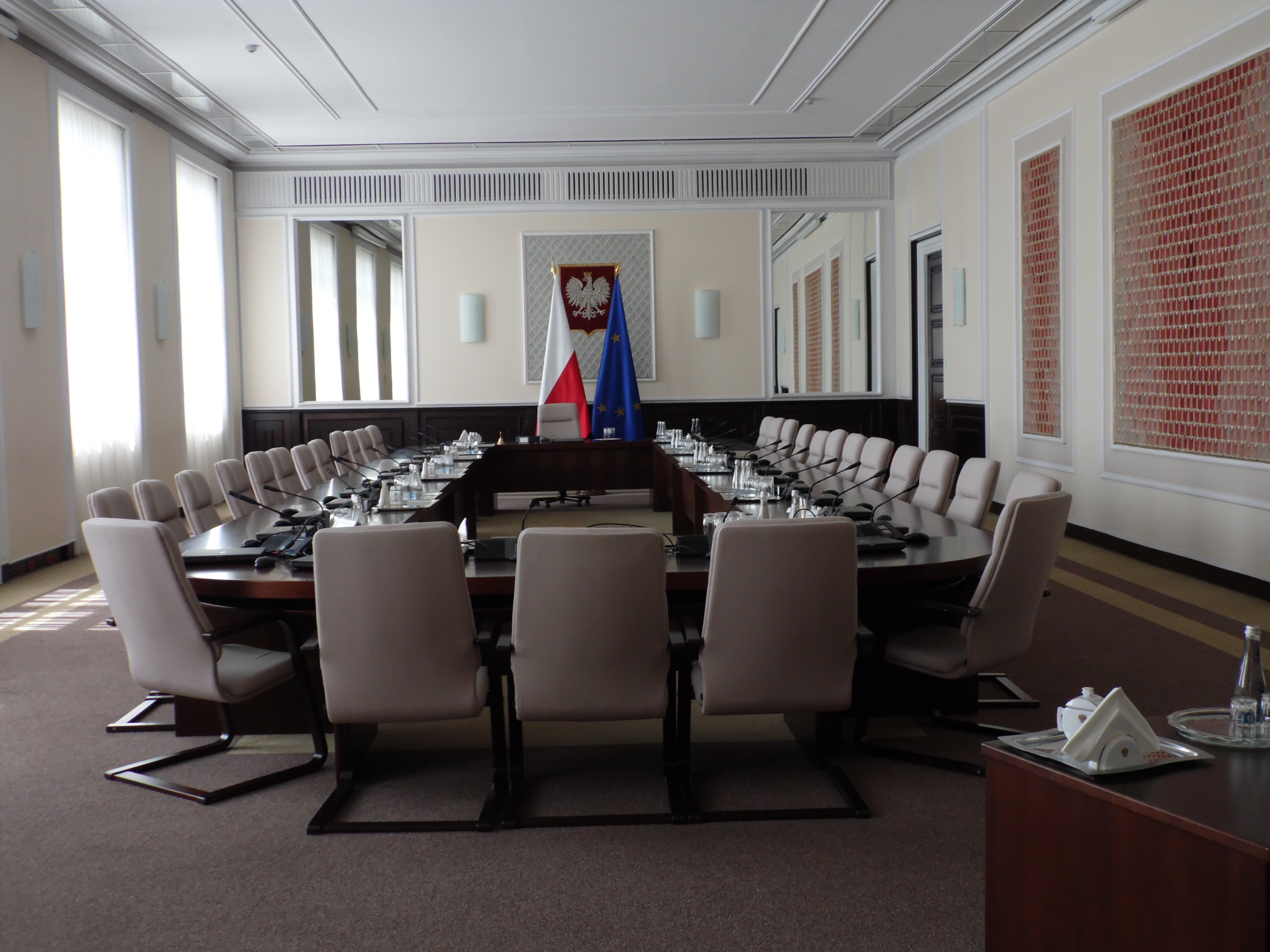
The room where the government meetings are held

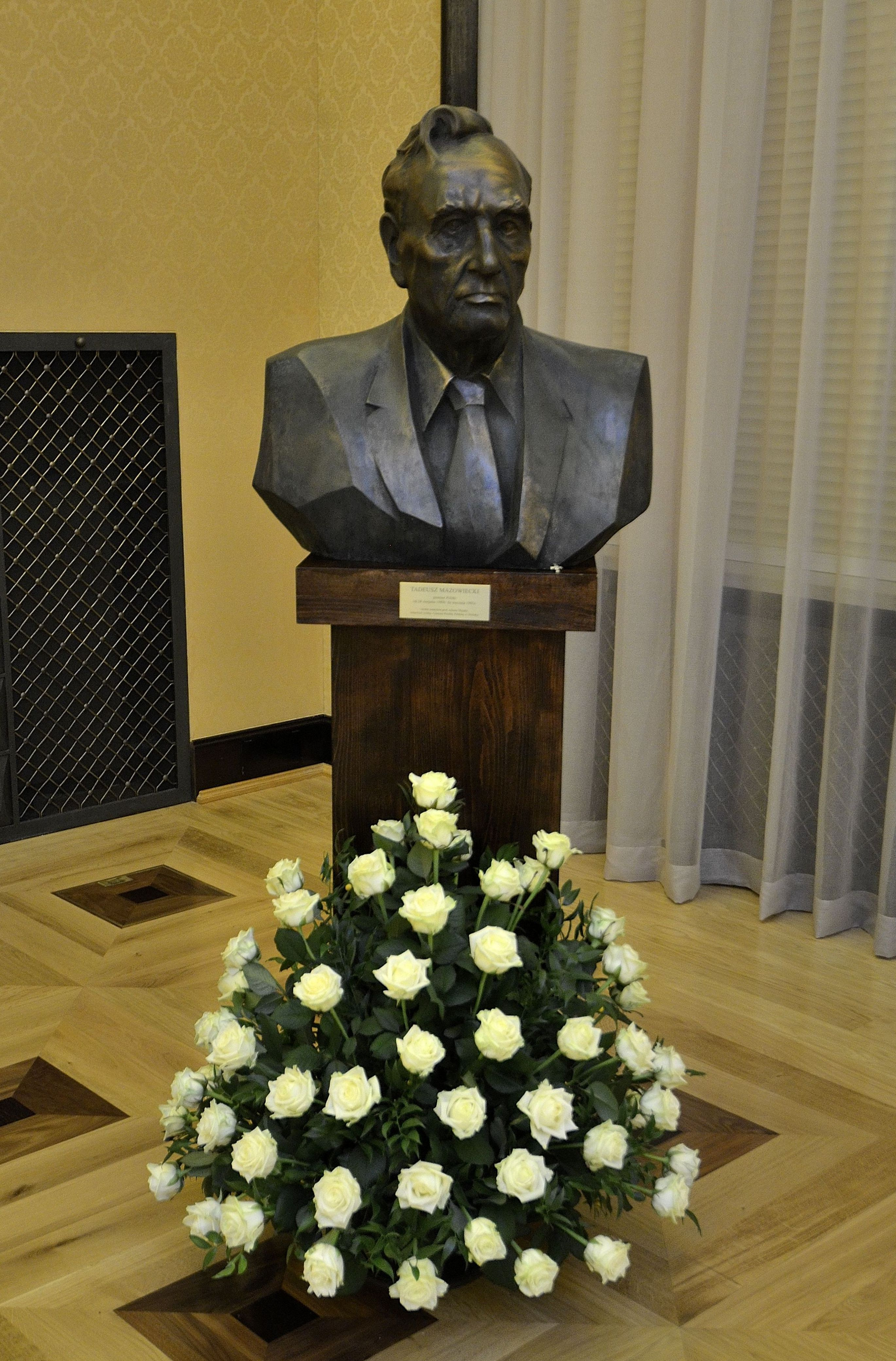
Bust of Tadeusz Mazowiecki in the hall named after him

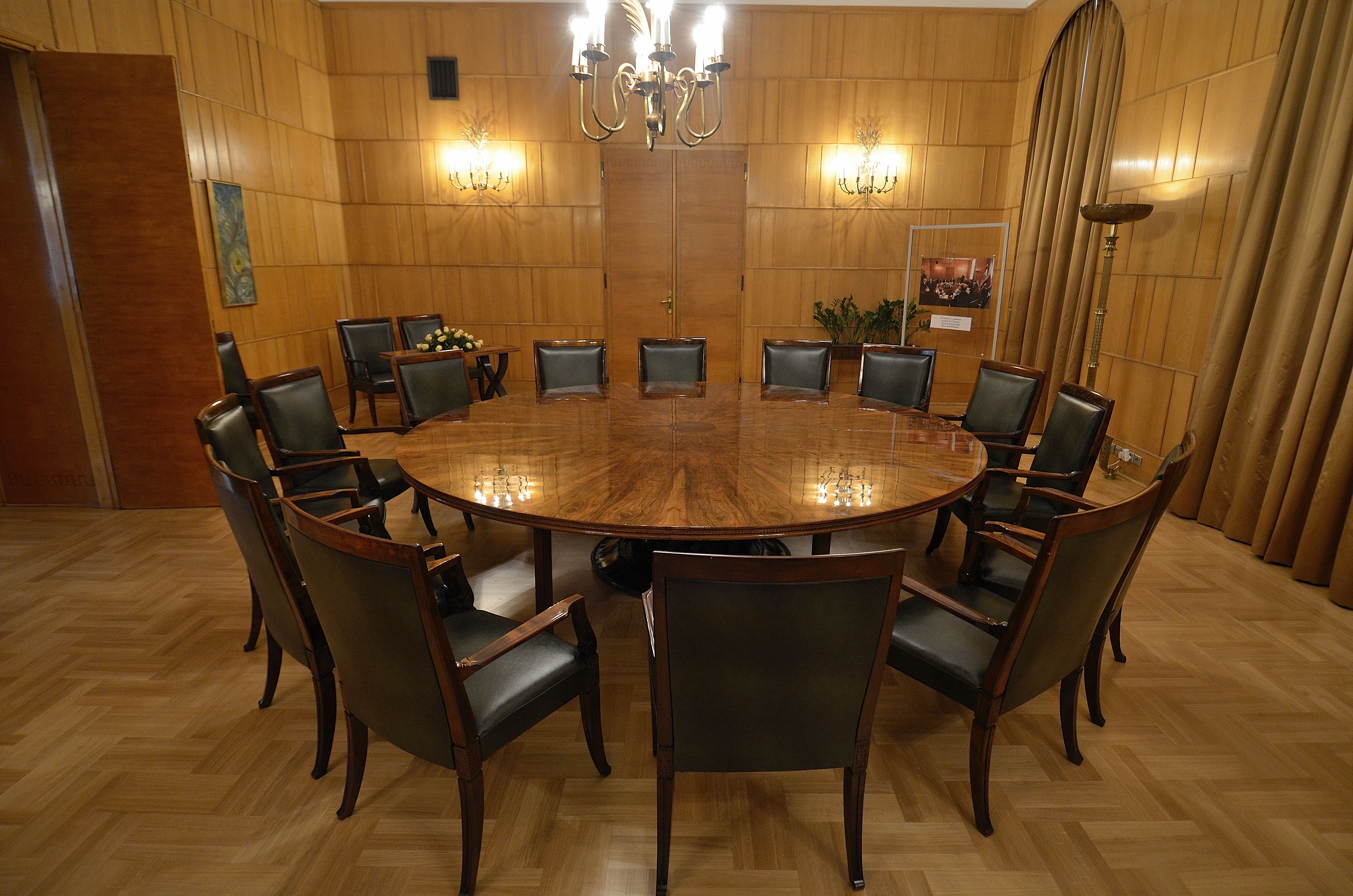
Round Table Hall

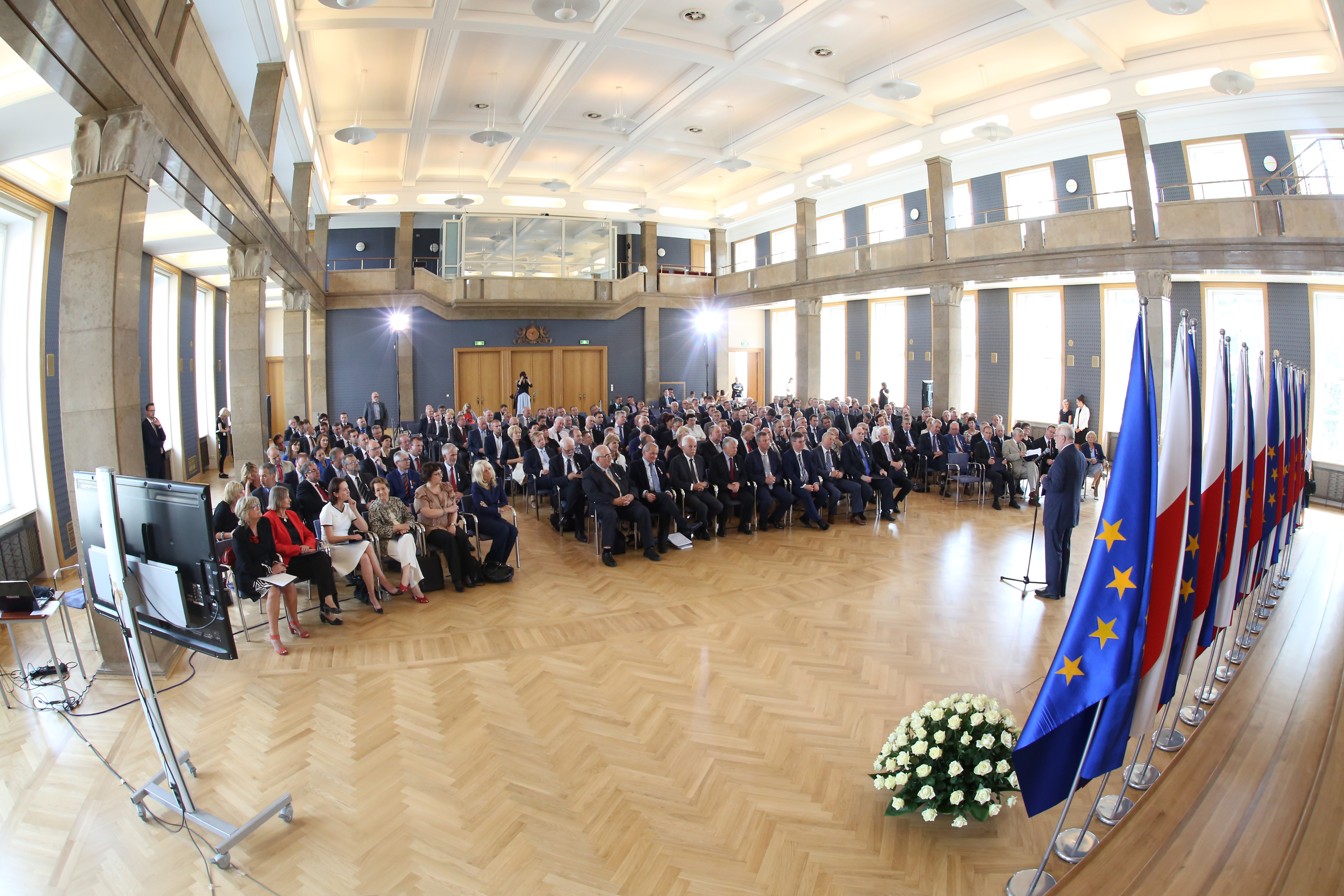
Column Hall, from December 13, 2015 Anna Walentynowicz Hall

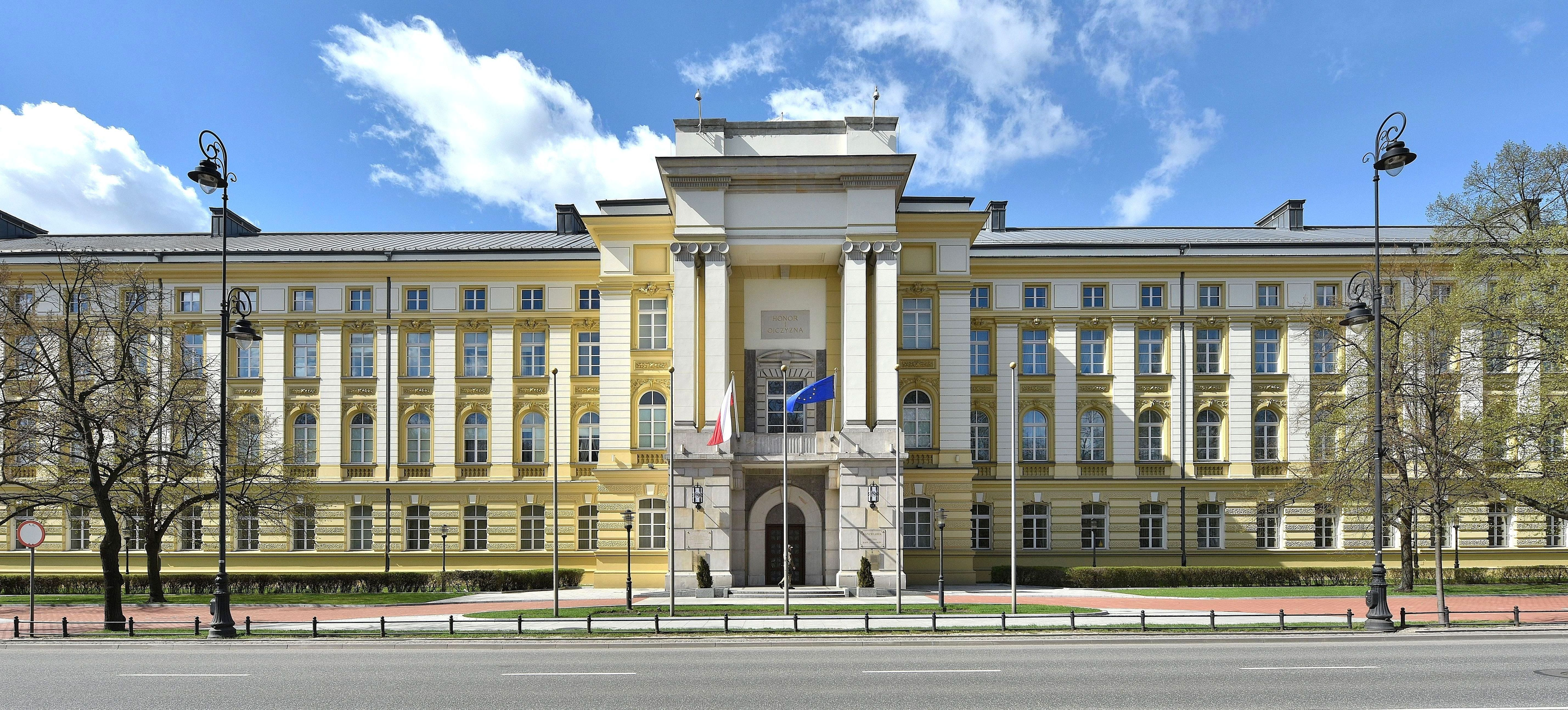
Chancellery building (2017)
