= Michaela Musilová =

Michaela Musilová may refer to:

- Michaela Musilová (astrobiologist) (born 1988), Slovak astrobiologist
- Michaela Musilová (sport shooter) (born 1989), Czech sport shooter
