= Jan Grabiec =

Polish politician (born 1972)

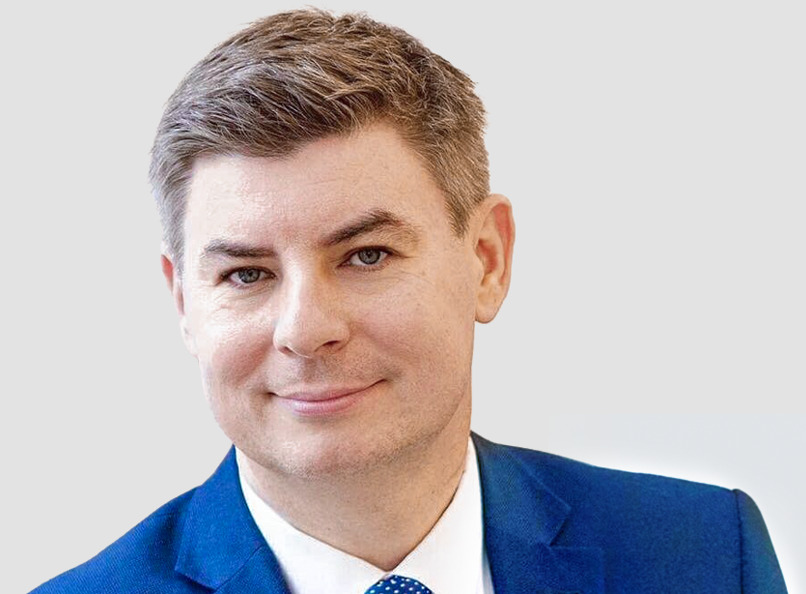
- Grabiec in 2023

Chief of the Chancellery of the Prime Minister Minister without portfolio
- Incumbent
- Assumed office 13 December 2023
- Prime Minister: Donald Tusk
- Preceded by: Izabela Antos

Member of the Sejm
- Incumbent
- Assumed office 12 November 2015
- Constituency: Warsaw II

Personal details
- Born: 2 November 1972 (age 53)
- Party: Civic Platform

Jan Grabiec (born 2 November 1972) is a Polish politician serving as minister without portfolio and as head of the Chancellery of the Prime Minister since 2023. He has been a member of the Sejm since 2015.
