= Yajaira Sierra-Sastre =

Puerto Rican scientist

- Born: Guayama, Puerto Rico
- Education: University of Puerto Rico at Mayagüez (BS); Cornell University (PhD)
- Scientific career
- Thesis: Vapor-Liquid-Solid Growth Of Semiconductor Nanowires From Biotemplated Gold Nanoparticle Catalysts (2010)

Yajaira Sierra-Sastre is a Puerto Rican materials scientist, educator, and aspiring astronaut. She was part of a six-person crew, and the only Hispanic, selected to participate in a four-month-long, Mars analog mission funded by NASA. Sierra-Sastre aspires to become the first Puerto Rican woman to travel to outer space.

== Early years ==
Sierra-Sastre was born in Guayama, Puerto Rico, and raised in the town of Arroyo where she received her secondary education. Throughout her childhood, she dreamed of becoming an astronaut. After graduating from Carmen Bozello de Huyke High School, she attended the Mayagüez Campus of the University of Puerto Rico where she earned a Bachelor of Science degree in Chemistry. After teaching to middle and high school students for a year and a half, Sierra-Sastre participated in a summer research experience program for teachers at Stanford University, where she was first introduced to nanotechnology research. During that time, she was trained in the self-assembly of mono-molecular films. Upon returning to Puerto Rico, she enrolled in graduate Environmental Health courses at the School of Public Health at the University of Puerto Rico Medical Science Campus and graduate Chemistry courses at the University of Puerto Rico at Río Piedras. Sierra-Sastre then attended Cornell University, where she earned a Ph.D. in 2009 in Nanomaterials Chemistry and specialized in the bionanofabrication of semiconductor nanowires. As part of her doctoral studies, Sierra-Sastre researched at Los Alamos National Laboratory. Among the scientific works which she has co-authored is the 2008 article "Vertical Growth of Ge Nanowires from Biotemplated Au Nanoparticle Catalysts," published in the Journal of the American Chemical Society, volume 130, issue 10488.

After completing her PhD, Sierra-Sastre worked as a senior research scientist and microscopist at two nanotechnology start-up companies in Ithaca, New York, where she designed, developed and characterized nanostructured coatings for medical devices/diagnostics, lithium-ion batteries, and the textile sector.

Sierra-Sastre also served as a research scientist and project manager at the U.S. Bureau of Engraving and Printing's (BEP's) Office of Technology Development until April 2020. She now serves as a Project Manager at NASA supporting the Mars Sample Return and lunar VIPER (Volatile Investigating Polar Exploration Rover) missions.

== NASA's Mars simulation project ==
One of the biggest food challenges astronauts face is menu fatigue. If the overall food intake declines, astronauts are at risk of nutritional deficiency, loss of bone and muscle mass, and lethargy. In 2013, the NASA Human Research Program funded a project called "HI-SEAS," an acronym for “Hawaii Space Exploration Analog and Simulation,” to determine the best way to keep astronauts well nourished during multiple-year missions to Mars or the moon.

A planetary module was built on the Hawaiian island of Mauna Loa, which simulates the living conditions for astronauts at a future base on Mars. It is believed that the saddle area side of the island resembles a Martian environment.

External videos
- You may watch and listen to Dr. Yajaira Sierra Sastre during an interview here

After receiving more than 700 applications for positions as crew members of the simulated Mars mission, NASA and researchers from Cornell University and the University of Hawaii at Mānoa chose six astronaut-like individuals. Sierra-Sastre was part of the selected crew with qualifications similar to those required by NASA for their astronaut applicants. The other five are Dr. Oleg Abramov, Simon Engler, Kate Greene, Dr. Sian Proctor and Dr. Angelo Vermeulen. Three additional individuals made up the reserve crew.

Prior to the four-month mission, which began in March 2013, the crew participated in a two-week training session. Once the mission began the crew was not allowed to have any communication with the outside world, except for limited e-mail, and simulated space suits were required if they stepped outside the module. During the mission they tested new forms of food and food preparation strategies for deep-space travel. Sierra-Sastre also researched pre-market anti-microbial fabrics and how long they lasted, which is important given the limited water availability on a space mission. Members of the crew were given items such as shirts, bedsheets, and socks, and were asked to fill out surveys rating qualitative factors like odor, comfort, and appearance. Samples were also taken from the fabrics after use to measure the microbial growth. Research teams from Johnson Space Center also provided exercise and sleep clothing for testing during the mission, in preparation for an International Space Station technology demonstration in 2014.

Sierra-Sastre and her colleagues emerged from the space habitat on August 13, ending the four-month simulated mission.

== Astronaut applicant ==
Sierra-Sastre has applied for the NASA Astronaut Candidate Program and aspires to become the first Puerto Rican woman to fly to space.

== Informal Science Education and Public Outreach ==
A teacher-turned scientist, Yajaira is extremely passionate about STEM education and has collaborated with numerous organizations for the execution of citizen-science initiatives in the Americas. In 2016 she assembled a team of students, educators, scientists, engineers, and makers who designed a CubeSat payload that flew onboard Project Perlan's glider during a high-altitude flight in Calafate, Argentina. Sierra-Sastre has also collaborated in the development of educational science videos about the contributions of Puerto Rican scientists in the field of space exploration.

Yajaira is the former Chair of the PoSSUM 13, a group of thirteen women professionals from Project PoSSUM who serve as global ambassadors for STEM and space.

== The smallest National Anthem ever written ==
Sierra-Sastre also collaborated in a variety of STEM education and public outreach projects with the National Nanotechnology Infrastructure Network and the Cornell Nanoscale Facility, including writing the smallest anthem ever written La Borinqueña Más Pequeña (the Puerto Rican national anthem).

== See also ==
- List of Puerto Ricans
- List of Puerto Ricans in the United States Space Program
- Puerto Rican scientists and inventors
- History of women in Puerto Rico
