= Angelo Vermeulen =

Belgian scientist and artist

Dr. Angelo Vermeulen
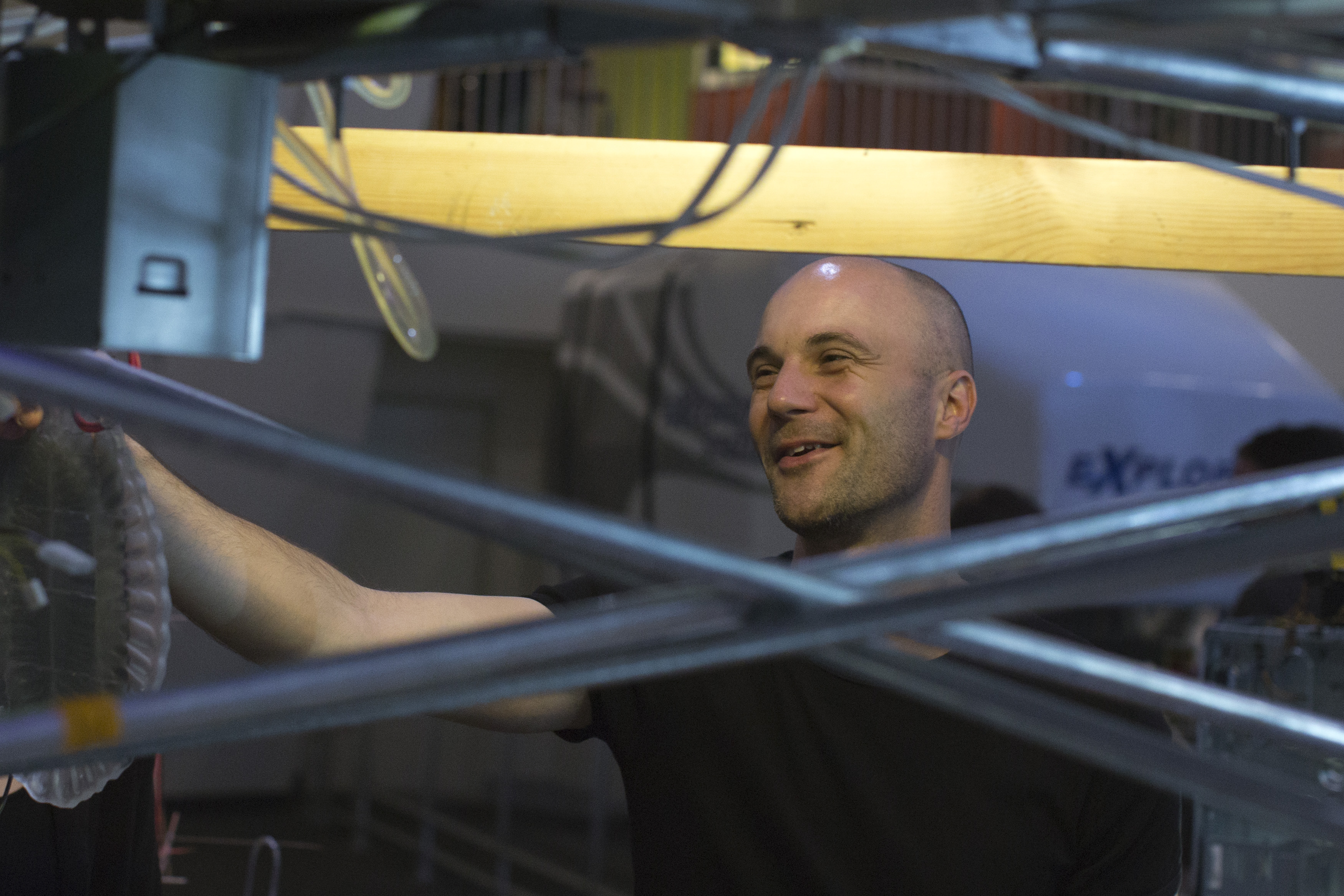
- at the New York Hall of Science in New York, 2012. by Andrew Kelly
- Born: 27 December 1971; Sint-Niklaas, Belgium
- Known for: HI-SEAS; Biomodd; Seeker; Blue Shift [LOG. 1]; Senior TED Fellow
- Awards: De Tijd Tech Pioneer 2017; Witteveen+Bos-prijs voor Kunst+Techniek; Michael Kalil Endowment for Smart Design Fellowship
- Scientific career
- Fields: Biology; Bio-inspired Engineering; Space Systems Engineering; Visual Arts; Photography; Design Theory
- Website: www.angelovermeulen.net; www.seads.network

Angelo Vermeulen (born 1971, Sint Niklaas) is a Belgian space systems researcher, biologist and artist. In 2009 he co-founded SEADS (Space Ecologies Art and Designs), an international transdisciplinary collective of artists, scientists, engineers, and activists Its goal is to reshape the future through critical inquiry and hands-on experimentation. Biomodd is one of their most well-known art projects and consists of a worldwide series of co-created interactive art installations in which computers coexist with internal living ecosystems. For the last ten years, he has been collaborating with the European Space Agency’s MELiSSA program on biological life support for space and in 2013 he was crew commander of one of the NASA-funded HI-SEAS Mars mission simulations in Hawai'i. Currently, he works at Delft University of Technology on advanced concepts for interstellar exploration. His work proposes a bio-inspired design approach to deal with the unpredictability inherent to interstellar travel. He is a Senior TED Fellow and was selected in 2017 as one of the Top 5 Tech Pioneers from Belgium by the newspaper De Tijd.

== Academic career ==
In 1998 Vermeulen completed his PhD on mouthpart deformities in non-biting midge larvae at the biology department of the Catholic University of Leuven in Belgium. In that same year he also graduated from the Municipal Academy of Fine Arts in Leuven, where he studied photography. Vermeulen left Belgium to work in London as a photographer together with Nick Waplington.

After his return to Belgium in 2001, he attended a two-year post-academic course at the Higher Institute for Fine Arts (HISK) in Belgium. This became the starting point of an exploration to try and find out how biology and ecological processes can interact in art and how to materialize them as art installations.

From 2011 to 2012 he was a member of the European Space Agency Topical Team Arts & Science (ETTAS) In 2012 he was a Michael Kalil Endowment for Smart Design Fellow at Parsons School of Design in New York. He also held positions at LUCA School of Visual Arts in Ghent (Belgium) and Die Angewandte in Vienna (Austria) and has been (guest) faculty at universities across Europe, the US, and Southeast Asia. In 2011 Vermeulen started research on advanced concepts for interstellar exploration at Systems Engineering and Simulation at Delft University of Technology.

== SEADS ==
Angelo Vermeulen is co-founder of Space Ecologies Art and Design (SEADS), a transdisciplinary and cross-cultural collective of artists, scientists, engineers and activists. Its members come from all corners of the world, from places such as the Philippines, Malaysia, Kosovo, Belgium and the US. SEADS is actively engaged in deconstructing dominant paradigms about the future and develops alternative models through a combination of critical inquiry and hands-on experimentation.

Over the past years, the collective has created a range of paradigm-shifting projects in which different domains such as visual art, neuroscience, ecology and space technology are blended in unique ways. SEADS employs its own signature methodology which is centered around community building, co-creation and bottom-up design. Since 2009, the collective has co-created more than 40 art projects, together with local communities in Europe, the Americas, Asia and the Pacific.

== Selected Art Projects ==
=== Biomodd (2007-Ongoing) ===
Conceived in 2007 during a four-month residency at the ‘Aesthetic Technologies Lab’ in Athens, Ohio, Biomodd is a collaborative, community-based art installation comprising works involving symbiotic relations between plants and computers. For example, one project involved using algae to cool computer processors so that these could run faster, while at the same time the heat generated by the computer electronics improved the algae's ability to grow. The exhibition has since traveled to the Philippines, Slovenia, New Zealand, Belgium, New York (US), Chile, the Netherlands and London (Great Britain).

=== Merapi Terraforming Project (2011) ===
The Merapi Terraforming Project is an art-science project on the Merapi volcano in Indonesia was set up after a large eruption in 2010. The Merapi Terraforming Project used nitrogen-fixing bacteria to help grow legumes in a structure on the flanks of the volcano as both an experiment in food production and a monument to the traumatic past of the location. The project illustrates how art, astrobiology and social outreach can be combined to address real-world issues on Earth.

=== Seeker (2012 - Ongoing) ===
Seeker is a DIY spaceship model which experiments with the integration of the technological, ecological and social systems that enable long-term survival in a spaceship. Vermeulen started the first edition of Seeker (DV1) in response to the Witteveen+Bos Art+Technology award he won in 2012. The designing and making of Seeker was a collaboration between Witteveen+Bos engineers, local artists, independent volunteers and the artist as inspirer/connector. The spaceship was exhibited in autumn 2012 in the Bergkerk church in Deventer, the Netherlands.

By the end of the exhibition, Seeker became partly demolished and re-used for a second edition during the Space Odyssey 2.0-exhibition in Z33 in Hasselt (Belgium). Several months before the opening of the exhibition, Vermeulen launched an open call for ideas and participation on Seeker (HS2). The outward construction was unaltered, but the interior changed depending on the needs and priorities of the new crew. Although Vermeulen and Matilda Krzykowski share their leadership over the crew, there is no hierarchy in the process of realizing the work.

Seeker is primarily a community project in which a tiny, isolating room is created to provide the best possible conditions for a particular group of inhabitants. Seeker developed itself as a traveling project with always new groups of participants.

=== Geotrauma Lab (2019) ===
Geotrauma Lab engages the visitor into an active dialogue about humanity’s deep future, both on Earth and in outer space. Part architectural integration, part performance piece, it functions as a temporary space where scenarios about the future are being constructed, questioned, and archived.

A parasitic architectural structure was built inside the Palazzo Viceconte, starting in one of the exhibition spaces and extending all the way into a centuries-old water cistern. The lower part of the structure inside the water cistern was conceived as a human habitat. During his performance, Angelo Vermeulen lived in isolation in this hypogean space for several consecutive days. When a visitor entered the architectural structure, the artist came up, took a seat opposite him/her, and proposed a series of deep future scenarios. These scenarios ranged from global atmospheric deoxygenation to rebooting human civilization in outer space. The ensuing discussions were recorded and added to a gradually growing archive. While living inside the cistern, the artist was analyzing, transcribing, and printing the ideas that were exchanged. After the performance, the lab was opened to the public.

== Selected Scientific Projects ==
=== E|A|S (Evolving Asteroid Starships) ===
The hostile and unpredictable environment of deep space requires a new conceptual approach for interstellar flight, one that differs radically from any current design in aerospace. Using biology as inspiration, E|A|S (Evolving Asteroid Starships) explores the concept of spaceships that physically grow and evolve during their interstellar journey. Resources extracted through asteroid mining are used to 3D print new components of the ship in an endless process of adaptation. A biological life support system based on the European Space Agency’s MELiSSA program is used to keep multiple generations of crew members alive. The DSTART (TU Delft Starship Team) team is currently developing detailed concept studies and computer simulations to test these ideas. The DSTART team is part of the SEAD network.

=== HI-SEAS ===
HI-SEAS (Hawaii Space Exploration Analog and Simulation) is an analog habitat for human spaceflight to Mars.^{[1][2][3]} HI-SEAS is located in an isolated position on the slopes of the Mauna Loavolcano on the island of Hawaii. The area has Mars-like features and an elevation of approximately 8,200 feet above sea level. HI-SEAS is funded by the NASA Human Research Program for four research missions. The missions are of extended duration from four months to a year.

The purpose of the detailed research studies is to determine what is required to keep a space flight crew happy and healthy during an extended mission to Mars and while living on Mars.^{[4]}Research into food, crew dynamics, behaviors, roles and performance, and other aspects of space flight and a mission on Mars itself is the primary focus. The HI-SEAS researchers also carry out studies on a variety of other topics as part of their daily activities.

Vermeulen was crew commander of a four-month Mars simulation mission. HI-SEAS (Hawaii Space Exploration Analogand Simulation) takes place on the flanks of the Mauna Loa Volcano which is the closest approximation of the actual surface of Mars. The mission intends to study improving the taste and nutritional quality of the meals consumed during a spaceflight. Previous spaceflight simulations such as MARS-500 proved the importance of the quality of the food during long periods of isolation of this nature. During the mission, Vermeulen is in charge of a six-man crew consisting of researchers from different backgrounds. Among the other researchers Oleg Abramov, Simon Engler, Kate Greene, Sian Proctor, and Yajaira Sierra Sastre, Vermeulen is the only European member of the crew. Due to his experience in community building in complex conditions, such as Biomodd and other projects, he is commissioned as the leader of the crew. Aside from the food study, Vermeulen investigates the possibilities of remote-operated robotic agriculture in order to create semi-autonomous farms for Mars settlement. The mission is initiated by NASA in collaboration with Cornell University of New York and the University of Manoa in Hawaii.

In September - October 2015, Vermeulen exhibited a selection of art photos he made when he was commander on a HI-SEAS mission at the Dome of Visions in Stockholm (Sweden).

=== MELiSSA ===
The Micro-Ecological Life Support System Alternative (MELiSSA) is a European Space Agency initiative (ESA) with the aim to develop the technology for a future regenerative life support system for long term human space missions. Initiated in 1989, the design is inspired by a terrestrial ecosystem. Today MELiSSA is a consortium made up of 30 organisations across Europe.

== Awards ==
- 2003: Provincial Price for Visual Arts East Flanders
- 2012: Witteveen + Bos Art + Technology Award
- 2012: Michael Kalil Endowment for Smart Design Fellowship
