= Izabela Antos =

Polish civil servant and lawyer (born 1986)

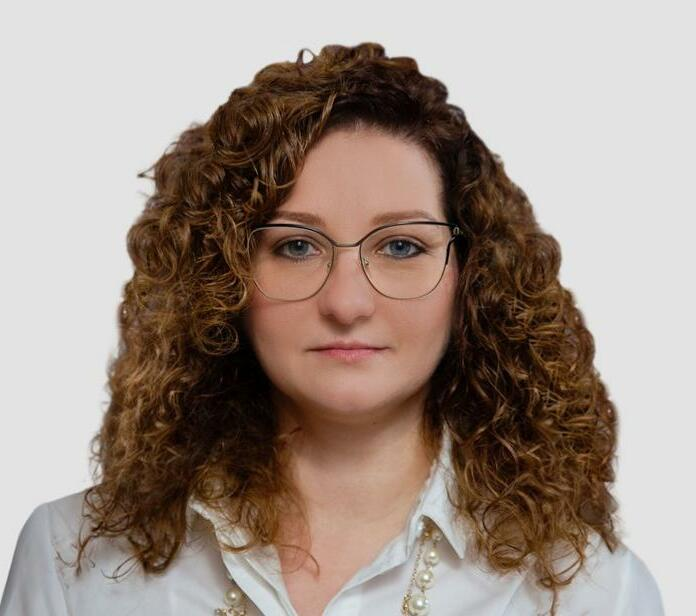
- Antos in 2023

Head of the Prime Minister's Chancellery Minister without portfolio
- In office 27 November 2023 – 13 December 2023
- Prime Minister: Mateusz Morawiecki
- Preceded by: Marek Kuchciński
- Succeeded by: Jan Grabiec

Personal details
- Born: 5 December 1986 (age 39) Otwock, Poland

Izabela Antos (born 5 December 1986) is a Polish lawyer and civil servant who was Head of the Chancellery of the Prime Minister and a member of the third cabinet of Mateusz Morawiecki from November to December 2023. She previously served as undersecretary of state and deputy head of the Chancellery from 2021, having worked in government administration since 2017.

== Early life and education ==
Izabela Antos was born on 5 December 1986 in Otwock, Poland. She graduated in law from the Cardinal Stefan Wyszyński University in Warsaw and completed a postgraduate course in international law and foreign service at the University of Warsaw.

== Career ==
Prior to the career in government, Antos worked in Powszechny Zakład Ubezpieczeń as a specialist and manager to the executive board.

While in government, she was a member of supervisory boards of the Polish Development Fund, AB Lotos Geonafta, and Orlen Unipetrol.

In April 2026, Antos became a member and treasurer of the Rozwój Plus Association, a political association led by Mateusz Morawiecki.
