= Institute of Biomedical Problems =

Institution of the Russian Academy of Sciences

Coordinates: 55.7795°N 37.5239°E

The Institute of Biomedical Problems (IMBP, also IBMP; Russian: Институт медико-биологических проблем РАН) is an institution of the Russian Academy of Sciences. The IMBP is the leading organization in Russia for conducting fundamental research in the field of space biology and medicine; medical and biological support of crewed space flights; development of methods and means of ensuring safety and life, preserving health and maintaining human performance in extreme conditions. Founded in 1963, it is based at 76a, Khoroshevskoe Shosse in Moscow. As of 2021, its director was Oleg Igorevich Orlov. It is known in the West particularly for the MARS-500 experiment simulating crewed flight to Mars as well as the Scientific International Research in Unique Terrestrial Station (SIRIUS) missions.
