= Stefan Szyller =

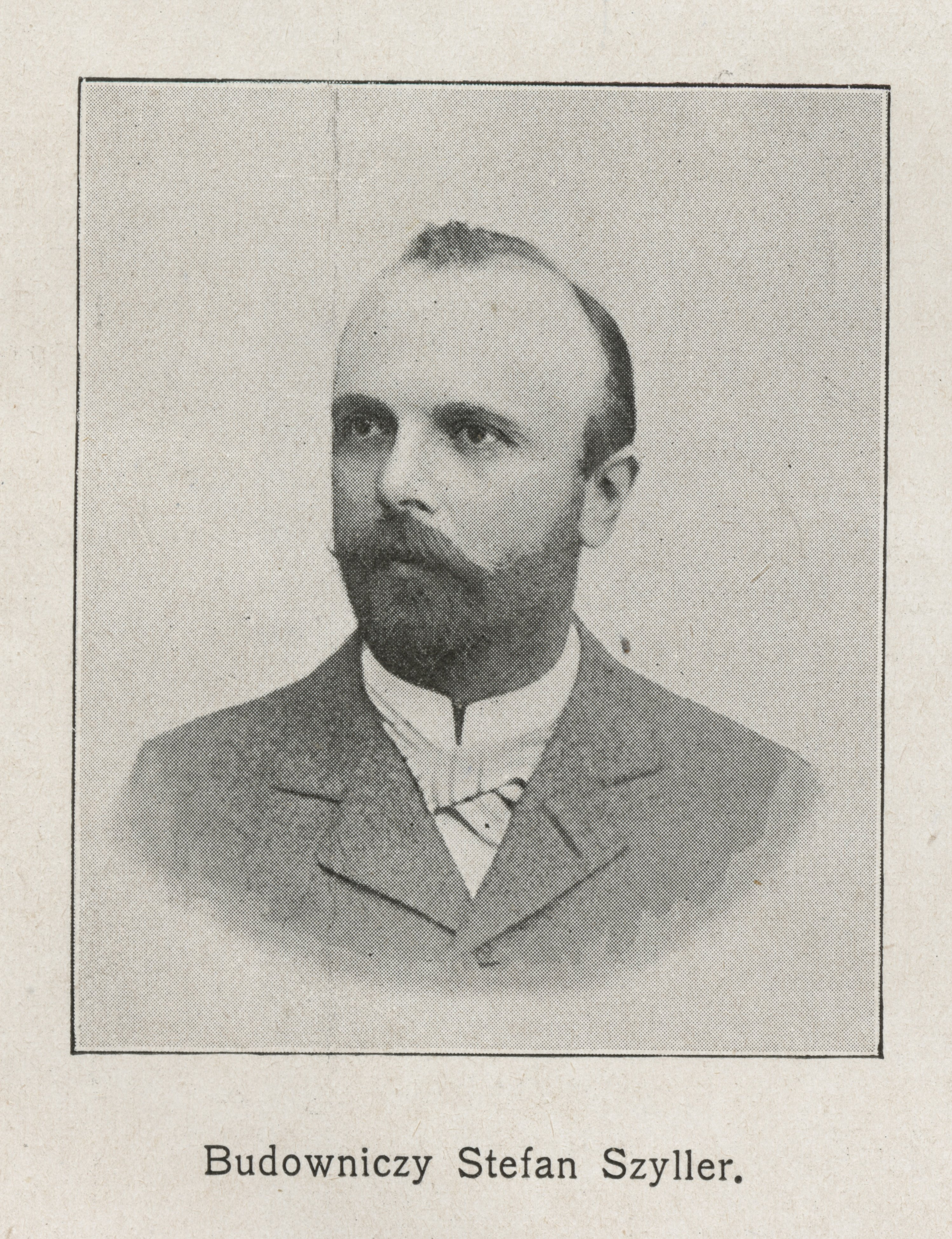
- Born: September 4, 1857; Warsaw
- Died: June 22, 1933 (aged 75); Kutno
- Education: Member Academy of Arts (1888)
- Alma mater: Imperial Academy of Arts (1881)
- Known for: Architecture
- Awards: Big Gold Medal of the Imperial Academy of Arts (1881)

Stefan Szyller (4 September 1857 — 22 June 1933) was a Polish architect, and academician of the Imperial Academy of Arts. His most prominent works are examples of architectural Revivalism, especially in the Neo-Renaissance and Neo-Baroque styles.

== Biography ==
Szyller was a graduate of the Imperial Academy of Arts (1881). During his studies he received awards from the Academy of Arts: a small silver medal (1878), a large silver medal (1879), a small gold medal (1880) for the program “Project of the City Council”, and a large gold medal (1881) for the “Project of the district court in the capital".

He moved to Warsaw in 1888), where he created about 700 Neo-Renaissance and Neo-Baroque buildings, and restored many historical structures. Szyller was the chief editor of an architectural magazine and architect of the city of Warsaw.

== Books ==
- Do we have Polish architecture? (1916).
- The tradition of folk architecture in Polish architecture (1917).

== Works ==
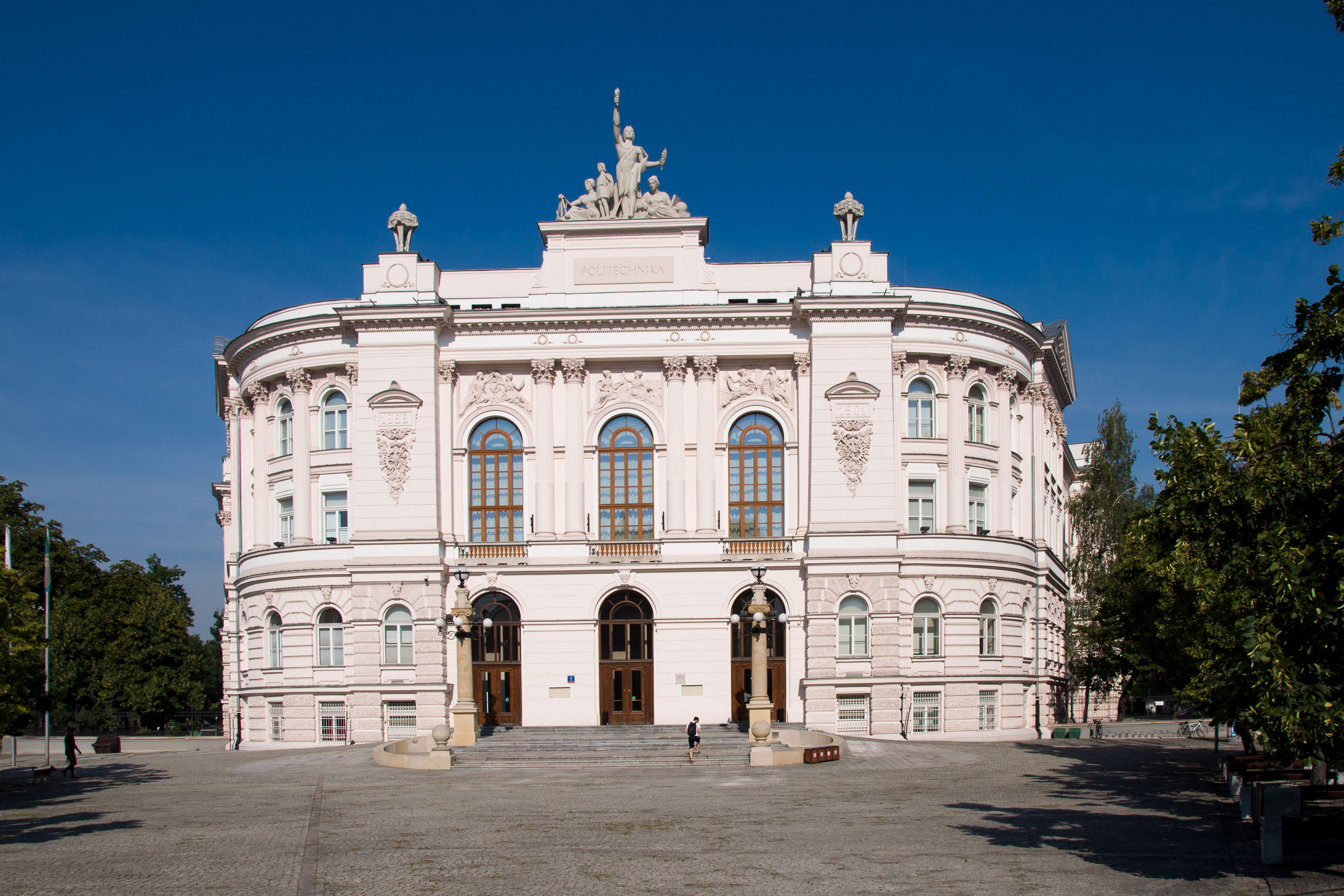
The main building of the Warsaw Polytechnic Institute (1899–1901)

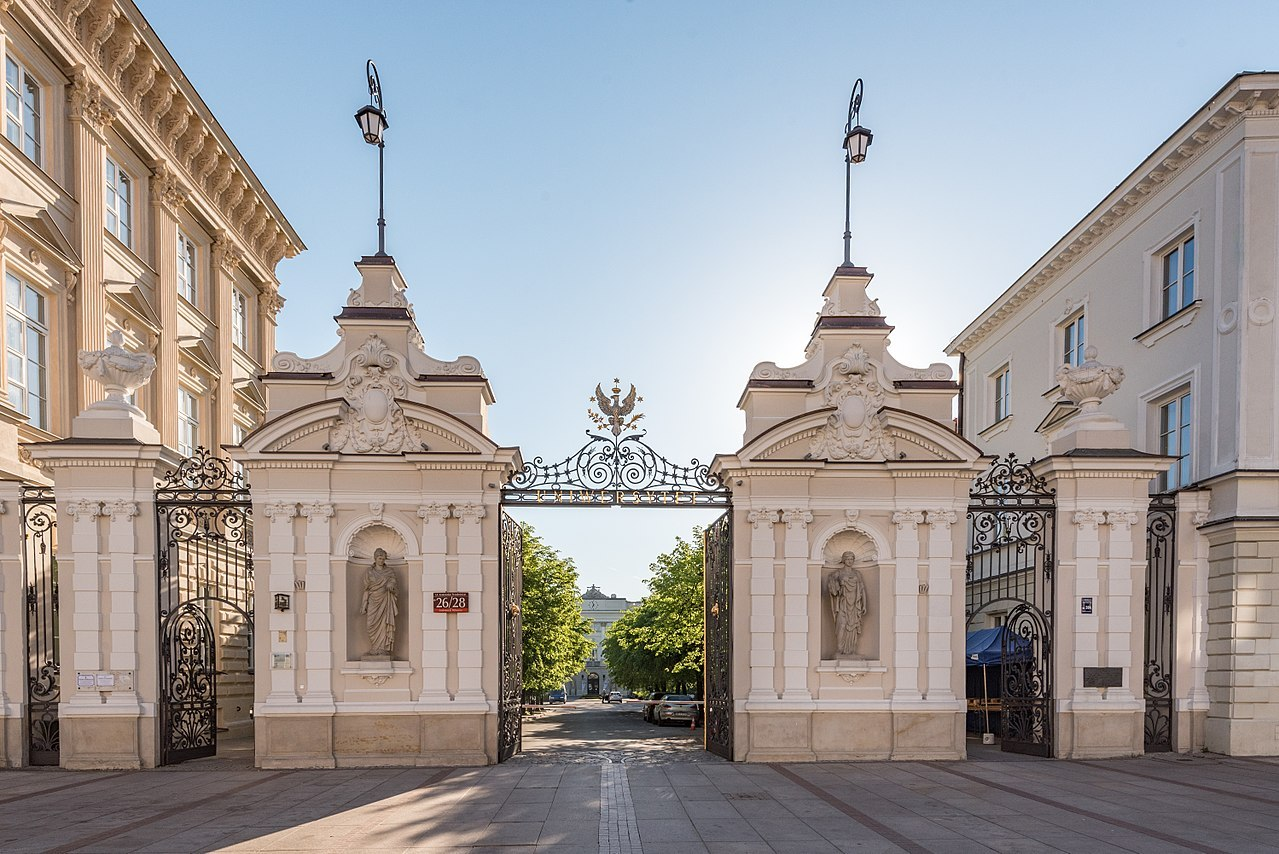
Library and gates of the University of Warsaw (1899–1901)

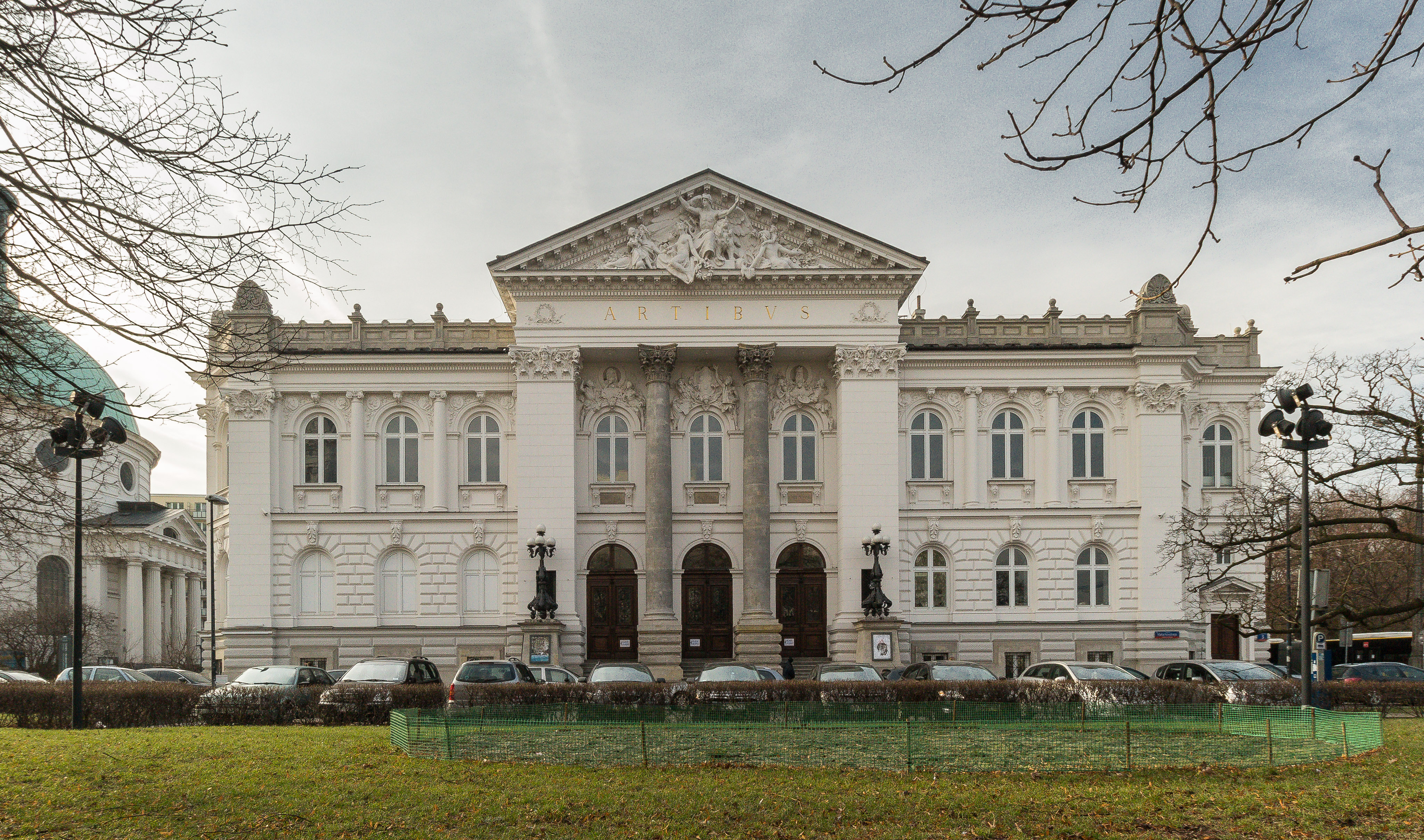
National Gallery of Art in Warsaw (1900)

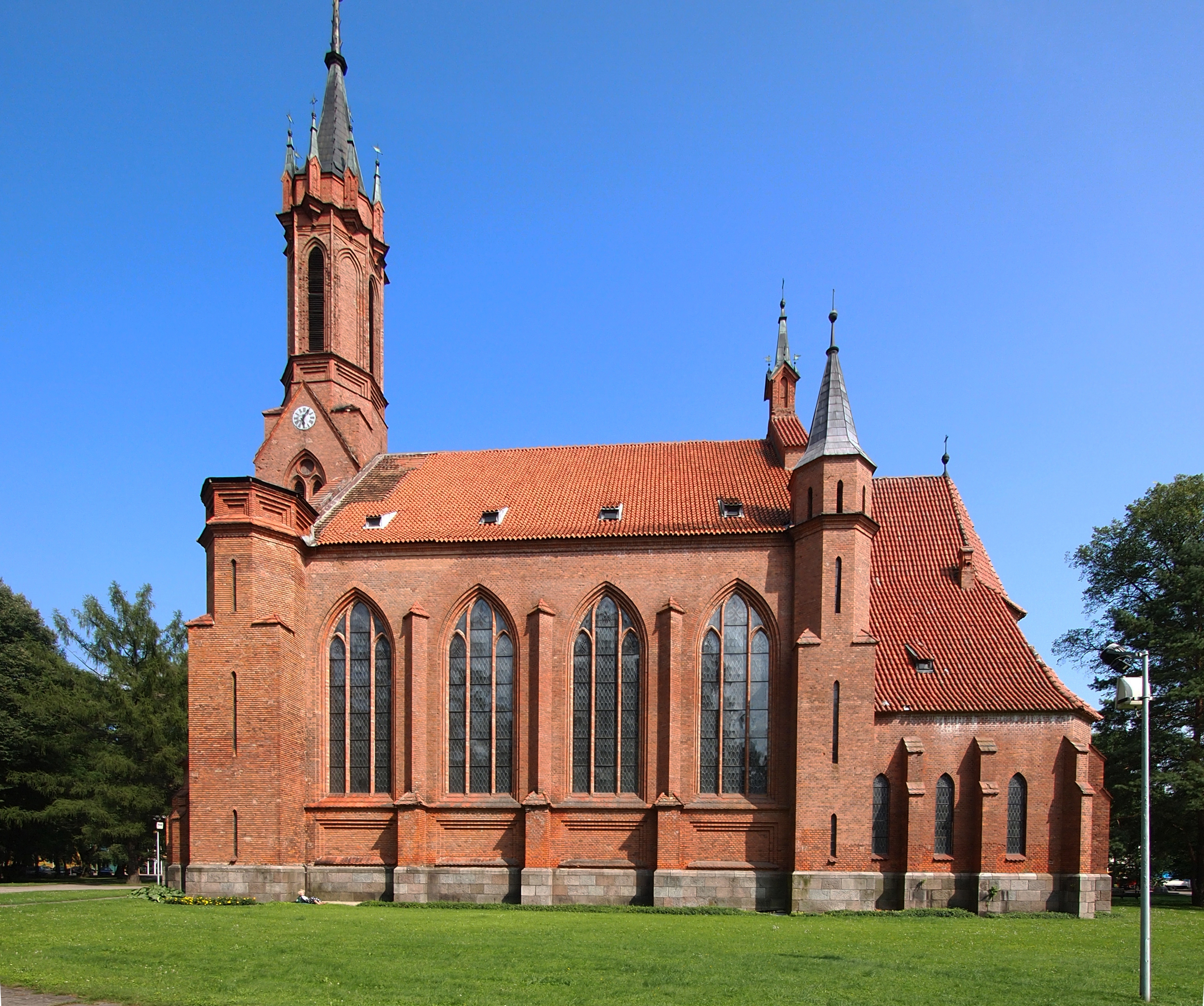
Church of Saint Mary's Scapular in Druskininkai

== Literature ==
- С. Н. Кондаков (1915). Юбилейный справочник Императорской Академии художеств. 1764-1914 (in Russian). Vol. 2. p. 412.
