= Maciej Musiał (politician) =

Polish politician and physicist (born 1952)

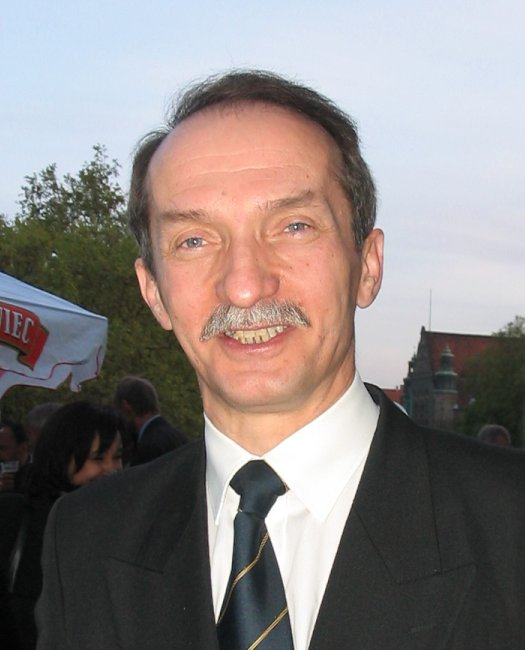
- Maciej Musiał in 2004

Chief of the Chancellery of the Prime Minister of Poland
- In office June 2000 – 19 October 2001
- Preceded by: Jerzy Widzyk
- Succeeded by: Marek Wagner

Voivode of the Greater Poland Voivodeship
- In office 1 January 1999 – 22 June 2001
- Preceded by: Office established
- Succeeded by: Stanisław Tamm

Voivode of the Poznań Voivodeship
- In office 1997 – 31 December 1998
- Preceded by: Włodzimierz Łęcki
- Succeeded by: Office abolished

Personal details
- Born: 22 January 1952 (age 74) Poznań, Poland
- Party: Solidarity Electoral Action
- Education: Adam Mickiewicz University

Maciej Wincenty Musiał (Polish: [ˈma.t͡ɕɛj vinˈt͡sɛn.tɘ̟ ˈmu.ɕaw]; born 22 January 1952) is a Polish politician and physicist. He was the Chief of the Chancellery of the Prime Minister of Poland from 2000 to 2001, the voivode of the Greater Poland Voivodeship from 1999 to 2001, and the voivode of the Poznań Voivodeship from 1997 to 1998.

== Biography ==
Maciej Musiał was born on 22 January 1952 in Poznań, Poland. In 1973, he graduated from the Faculty of Physics at the Adam Mickiewicz University in Poznań. From 1975 to 1990, he worked for the Wood Technology Institute in Poznań.

In 1980 he joined the Solidarity trade union. In 1981, following the enactment of the martial law in Poland, he was one of the organisers of the trade union's provisional board of the Greater Poland Region, and in 1989 became the regional deputy chairperson. The same year he was also the director of the Poznań division of the Solidarity Citizens' Committee, during the 1989 parliamentary election.

He was the director of the voivodeship office in Poznań from 1990 to 1996, the voivode of the Poznań Voivodeship from 1997 to 1998, and the voivode of the Greater Poland Voivodeship from 1999 to 2000. From June 2000 to October 2001 he was the chief of the Chancellery of the Prime Minister of Poland under the cabinet of Jerzy Buzek.

Later, he lectured at the Higher School of Banking in Poznań, and was the board and general director of the Konin Coal Mine from 2006 to 2008.

== Awards and decorations ==
- Officer's Cross of the Order of Polonia Restituta (2011)
- Cross of Freedom and Solidarity (2019)
- Title Distinguished to the City of Poznań (2020)
