= Michaela Musilová (astrobiologist) =

Slovak astrobiologist (born 1988)

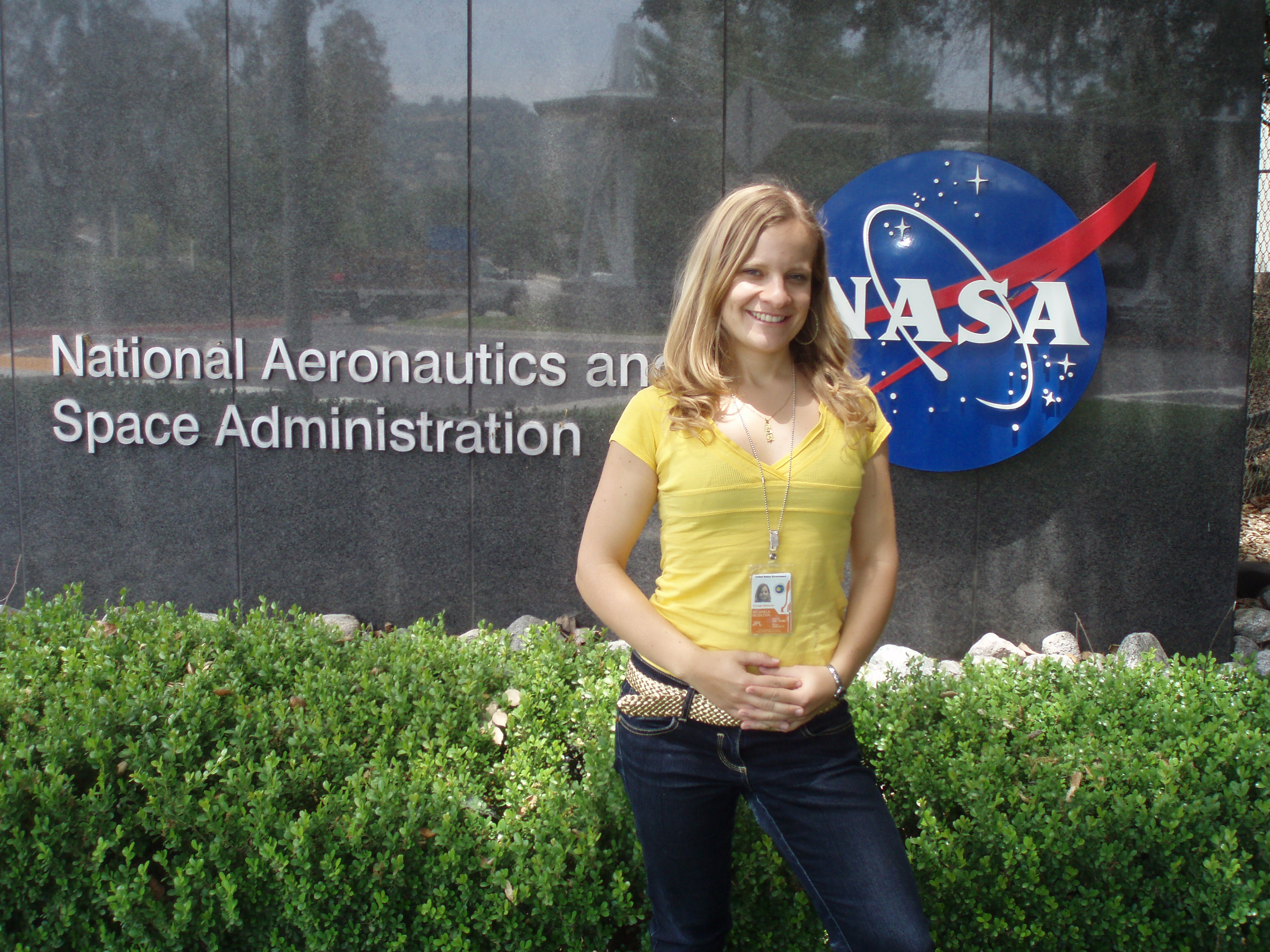
- Musilová in 2010
- Born: 11 October 1988 (age 38); Bratislava, Czechoslovakia
- Education: University of Bristol; International Space University; University College London; California Institute of Technology
- Scientific career
- Fields: Astrobiology
- Workplaces: HI-SEAS
- Website: www.michaelamusilova.com

Michaela Musilová (born 11 October 1988) is a Slovak astrobiologist. She was the HI-SEAS director from 2018 until 2022. Currently, Musilová is the president and founder of the non-profit XtremeFrontiers. She has commanded more than 30 simulated missions to the Moon and Mars - the most missions led to date.

== Biography ==
Musilová was born on 11 October 1988 in Bratislava. Her father is a diplomat and her mother is an archaeologist.

She received her PhD from the University of Bristol specialising in extremophiles with applications to astrobiology, environmental science and glaciology. She graduated from the International Space University's (ISU) Space Studies Program in 2015, where she now holds the position of Global Faculty. Previously, she studied at the University College London, where she received a master's degree in planetary sciences in 2011, studied at California Institute of Technology as an exchange student in 2009, and graduated from the French Lycée Chateaubriand in Rome, Italy in 2007.

Her research as an astrobiologist has been wide-ranging, including stints at the University of London Observatory, the UK Space Agency for the NASA MoonLite project, the Jet Propulsion Laboratory at NASA, the Mars Desert Research Station, and the Institute for Food Research in Slovakia.

Currently, Musilová is working on a pioneering global project, Astro Seven Summits. In cooperation with her team, Musilová's project combines expeditions to the highest peaks on each of the seven continents with scientific research and educational activities, in collaboration with NASA and other organizations worldwide.

== Selected awards ==
Musilová has received multiple prizes and grants, including the Emerging Space Leaders Grant from the International Astronautical Federation (2016) and the Women in Aerospace – Europe Young Professional Award (2016), and she was selected as one of the most promising 30 under 30 by Forbes Slovakia (2015). She was selected to journey to Antarctica with the largest all-female in STEM expedition. Musilová is also regularly invited to give keynote presentations and performs a variety of outreach activities globally as a science communicator. She has been giving interviews to international media for over 20 years, writing scientific and educational articles, and she co-authored her biography, Woman from Mars.

== Publications ==
Musilová is also a published author, with works ranging from scientific publications, to a biography, a fictional sci-fi story,, documentaries and interviews.

=== Select research publications ===
- Musilova, Michaela, Martyn Tranter, Sarah A. Bennett, Jemma Wadham, and Alexandre M. Anesio. "Stable microbial community composition on the Greenland Ice Sheet." Frontiers in microbiology 6 (2015): 193.
- Musilova, Michaela, Martyn Tranter, Jonathan L. Bamber, Nozomu Takeuchi, and A. M. Anesio. "Experimental evidence that microbial activity lowers the albedo of glaciers." Geochem. Perspect. Lett 2 (2016): 106-116.
- Musilova, Michaela, Martyn Tranter, Jemma Wadham, Jon Telling, Andrew Tedstone, and Alexandre M. Anesio. "Microbially driven export of labile organic carbon from the Greenland ice sheet." Nature Geoscience 10, no. 5 (2017): 360-365.
- Musilova, Michaela, Henk Rogers, Bernard Foing, Nityaporn Sirikan, Annelotte Weert, Sebastian Mulder, Benjamin Pothier, and Joshua Burstein. "EMM IMA HI-SEAS campaign February 2019." In EPSC-DPS Joint Meeting 2019, vol. 2019, pp. EPSC-DPS2019. 2019.

=== Biography ===
Musilová co-wrote the book about her life - A Woman from Mars [Žena z Marsu].

=== Sci-fi and fantasy ===
Musilová wrote a fictional short story, as part of the collection of stories by famous people from Bratislava, Slovakia: Prešporské legendy ožívajú [Bratislava Legends come to life] (2022, Litera Production; ISBN 9788097435400)

=== Documentaries ===
As part of the Seven Summits Project, Musilová is filming a documentary during each expedition to the tallest mountain on each continent. Her first documentary, Hakuna Matata Kilimanjaro, has been shown on four different continents and it was part of the Ekotopfilm Festival. Musilová's second documentary, The Boss - Aconcagua, came out in 2025 and is currently being shown in multiple countries.

=== Interviews ===
Musilová also regularly participates in interviews, notably with Forbes magazine, the Smithsonian, and other broadcast journalism.
