= HI-SEAS =

Analog habitat for human spaceflight to Mars

Coordinates: 19.602378°N 155.487192°W

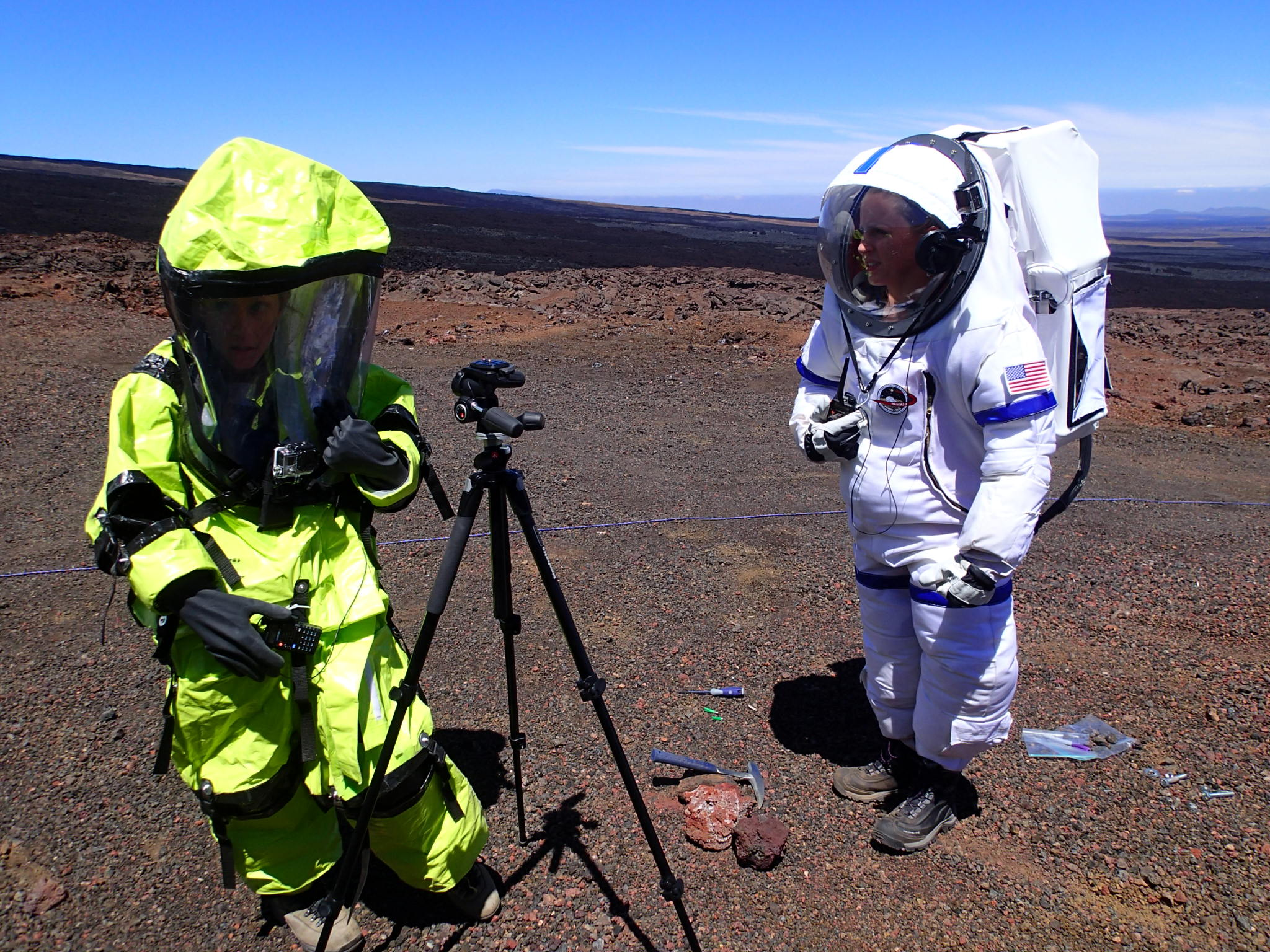
HI-SEAS tests hazmat and MX-C space suit simulators

The Hawaii Space Exploration Analog and Simulation (HI-SEAS) is an analog habitat for human spaceflight to Mars currently operated by the International MoonBase Alliance. Hl-SEAS is located in an isolated position on the slopes of the Mauna Loa volcano on the island of Hawaii. The area has Mars-like features and an elevation of approximately 8,200 feet (2,500 m) above sea level. The first HI-SEAS study was in 2013 and NASA's Human Research Program continued to fund and sponsor follow-up studies until 2018. The missions are of extended duration from four months to a year. Its missions place HI-SEAS in the company of a small group of analogs that are capable of operating very long duration missions (8-months and longer) in isolated and confined environments, such as Mars500, Concordia, and the International Space Station.

The purpose of the detailed research studies is to determine what is required to keep a space flight crew happy and healthy during an extended mission to Mars and while living on Mars. Research into food, crew dynamics, behaviors, roles and performance, and other aspects of space flight and a mission on Mars itself is the primary focus. The HI-SEAS researchers also carry out studies on a variety of other topics as part of their daily activities.

One thing under study by NASA is trying to understand crew dynamics such as morale, stress management, and how they solve problems as a group.

== The Facility ==
The geodesic habitation dome has an internal two-story open layout with a diameter of about 11 m (36 ft). The ground floor contains the communal areas with the kitchen, dining room, common work-space and lab, an exercise area and a small bathroom with a shower and toilet.

The ground floor has an area of 30.3 m^{2} (326 sq ft) (usable 26.8 m^{2} (288 sq ft)) with the second floor spanning an area of 39.4 m^{2} (424 sq ft) comprising six personal rooms and a small bathroom with toilet only. Attached to the exterior of the habitat is a single shipping container, providing storage for food and other supplies, as well as hosting the water and electrical systems.

== Missions ==
=== HI-SEAS I ===
The first HI-SEAS mission lasted for four months from 14 April to 13 August 2013 with culinary and psychological aspects. Many related aspects were also explored, including temperatures in artificial habitats. It was orchestrated primarily by NASA, University of Hawaiʻi at Mānoa, and Cornell University. The 2013 study included 8 people and ran for 120 days (4 months). The crew members were Angelo Vermeulen (commander, Belgium), Simon Engler (engineer, Canada), Kate Greene (writer, USA), Yajaira Sierra Sastre (scientist, USA), Oleg Abramov (geologist, USA), Sian Proctor (education outreach, USA). Members of the HI-SEAS crew went outside the habitat once a week in simulated spacesuits to explore the terrain and to perform geological and microbe-detection studies. The focus of the study was on a diet which consisted of traditional space food (such as freeze-dried items) as well as various recipes made from a special list of ingredients. Six scientists completed the study. Mission commander Angelo Vermeulen with his colleagues recommended more spices and higher fiber foods as well as comfort foods.

=== HI-SEAS II ===
HI-SEAS II with a crew of six people began 28 March 2014 and lasted 120 days, until 25 July 2014. The crew members were Casey Stedman (commander, USA), Tiffany Swarmer (USA), Ron Williams (USA), Anne Caraccio (USA), Ross Lockwood (Canada), and Lucie Poulet (France).

=== HI-SEAS III ===
HI-SEAS III began on 14 October 2014, and included six crew members and two reserve crew members: Martha Lenio (Commander), Allen Mirkadyrov, Sophie Milam, Neil Sheibelhut, Jocelyn Dunn, and Zak Wilson. Backup crew included Ed Fix and Micheal Castro. The mission ended on 13 June 2015.

This was the first 8-month stay for a crew and the third overall HI-SEAS mission. NASA used the study to examine and gain knowledge about crew size, isolation, and group communication and problem resolution dynamics. One question is ideal crew size, and like the previous mission this one included a crew of six people, but for double the amount of time as the previous missions.

The crew on HSIII performed 40 tasks a week for research studies. One of the experiments was on 3D printing.

=== HI-SEAS IV ===
HI-SEAS IV began on 29 August 2015 and lasted until 29 August 2016: 366 days due to the leap year. The crew members were Carmel Johnston (USA), Christiane Heinicke (Germany), Dr. Sheyna Gifford (USA), Andrzej Stewart (USA/UK), Cyprien Verseux (France), and Tristan Bassingthwaighte (USA). The backup crew included Oscar Mathews and Debbi-Lee Wilkinson.

The mission positions of HI-SEAS IV included the following specialities: commander, physicist, astrobiologist, physician, engineer, space architect, and journalist. The crew of six spent the whole year together on this mission. One of the major tasks was simply getting along with another in isolation as well as resolving interpersonal conflict if it occurred. Challenges the crew had to overcome during the mission included un-planned supply issues, water systems failures, and a communications failure.

During the mission many aspects of a Mars mission were simulated (see Mars analog habitat), such as a communication delay time and isolation. Many aspects of a Mars mission were not simulated, such as the reduced gravity of Mars. They did live at a higher altitude, which would have slightly boosted radiation exposure from space radiation. During the mission, all six crew-members blogged and several were featured on professional websites such as the Huffington Post, Aeon, and Narratively. The mission is also the subject of a film called Red Heaven which was released in 2020. Finally, HI-SEAS IV is the subject of the Gimlet Media podcast The Habitat.

The mission ended on 29 August 2016, with the crew emerging to a crowd of news media and cameramen. This was the longest HI-SEAS yet, and the longest NASA-funded space simulation in history, with the previous mission lasting 8 months, and before that 4 months.

With the beginning of the 4th mission, the 'HI-SEAS Habitability study' has been introduced. The rationale behind it is based on the strong assumption that habitability, along with human factors research, is of significant importance for living and working conditions, and thus the design, of an inhabited confined and isolated environment.

=== HI-SEAS V ===
HI-SEAS V began on 19 January 2017 and was scheduled to run for eight months. The crew consists of Ansley Barnard (USA), James Bevington (USA), Joshua Ehrlich (USA), Laura Lark (USA), Brian Ramos (USA), and Samuel Payler (UK). The six researchers, made up of engineers, a computer scientist, an astrobiologist, and a biomedical expert, focused on team dynamics and its effect on performance.

On 19 September 2017, the crew emerged from their 8-month long mission in the mock Mars habitat.

=== HI-SEAS VI ===
Hi-SEAS VI began on 15 February 2018 and was due to last eight months with a crew of four consisting of Sukjin Han (Korea), Calum Hervieu (Scotland), Lisa Stojanovski (Australia), and Michaela Musilova (Slovakia). However, the mission had to be halted on Sol 4 (19 February 2018) when a crew member was admitted to Hilo Medical Center. Hawaii News Now reported that the simulation had been halted while the Dome was inspected following the incident where a crew member suffered an electrical shock, but recovered fully.

Following HI-SEAS VI, NASA funded a data mining effort covering the previous missions.

The campaigns following HI-SEAS VI have no direct association with NASA and the original project team.

=== EMMIHS I ===
The first mission of the EMMIHS campaigns, EMMIHS I, began on February 20 and ended on March 6, 2019. The six-person crew consisted of Dr. Michaela Musilova, Annelotte Weert, Benjamin Pothier, Josh Burstein, Nityaporn Sirikan, and Sebastian Mulder. The crew was able to complete all of their mission targets. These included geological mapping of the Mauna Loa area for fresh pahoehoe lava flows and lava tubes by geology students Annelotte Weert and Sebastian Mulder.

=== EMMIHS II ===
The second edition of the EMMIHS campaigns (EMMIHS II) took place in late 2019. The overall focus of the EMMIHS II campaign was on geological, physical, organizational and psychological aspects of the HI-SEAS base and its direct surroundings. The crew consisted of Dr. Michaela Musilova, Sabrina Kerber, Ana Paula Castro De Paula Nunes, Ariane Wanske, Charlotte Pouwels, Joseph D’Angelo, Anouk Beniest, and Marc Heemskerk.

=== EMMIHS III ===
The third edition of the EMMIHS campaigns, EMMIHS III, began in early 2020, with a predominant focus on geological science and robot operations, EMMIHS-III aimed to widen knowledge on lava tubes and how to explore them in mars-like conditions. The crew for this mission consisted of Dr. Michaela Musilova, Marc Heemskerk, Kyla Pumehana Edison, Lucas Brasileiro, Robert Heemskerk, and Priyanka Das Rajkakati.

=== EMMIHS IV ===
The fourth and last edition of the EMMIHS campaigns, EMMIHS IV, began in mid 2020 as an Analog Astronaut Mission at HI-SEAS, aimed at researching the technical and sociological challenges of extraterrestrial habitation. It was initiated and supported by the European Space Agency.

=== Sensoria I ===
An all-woman mission, conducted from January 4 to 18, 2020. The crew included Erin Bonilla, Jaden Hastings, Adriana Blachowicz, Dr. Sian Proctor, Makiah Eustice and Maraia Hoffman.

=== Selene II ===
Selene II was the first of the Selene missions which aimed to simulate living in a HI-SEAS habitat on the moon, it lasted a total of 14 days from November 18, 2020 to December 1, 2020. The Selene II mission crew consisted of Dr. Michaela Musilova, Lindsay Rutter, Karen Rucker, Fabio Teixeira, Cassandra Klos, and Ben Greaves.

=== Selene III ===
Selene III began on February 22, 2021, and ended on March 7, 2021. The mission experiments included perchlorate and nitrate reduction using bacteria and aquaponics by Crew Bioengineer Zoe Maxwell, growing spinach using human hair as fertilizer, and microgreen growth experiments conducted by Bioscience Officer Jason Fischer. The crew included Dr. Michaela Musilova, Eboni Brown, Oscar I. Ojeda, Zoe Maxwell, Jason Fischer, and Brooke Edwards.

=== Selene IV ===
Selene IV began on March 13, 2021, and ended on March 26, 2021. The crew included Dr. Michaela Musilova, Lori Waters, Jack Bryan, Monica Parks, Cameron Crowell, and Bill O’Hara.

=== Selene V ===
The crew included Dr. Michaela Musilova, Sean Gellenbeck, Bader Al Moulah, Dr. Brandy Nunez, and Dr. Lindsey Kishline. The mission experiments and goals included research on the gas exchange between a mushroom culture and an algal culture for space mission applications, acoustic sound studies in lava caves near HI-SEAS, how the brain puts together complex audio-visual information, and possible future applications during space mining and civil construction on the moon through measuring the mechanical properties of analog lunar lava.

=== Valoria I ===
The Valoria I crew included Dr. Michaela Musilova, Karen Metzger, Kevin Pratt, Michael Barton, Hillary Coe, and MaryLiz Bender.

=== Valoria II ===
The Valoria II crew included Dr. Michaela Musilova, Lain Velasco, Paul Tomko, Chris Jackson, and Rilee Kaliher. The mission resulted in findings about proprioception and body awareness

=== Valoria III ===
The Valoria II crew included Dr. Michaela Musilova, Elisha Jhoti, Britaney Phillips, Sarafina El-Badry Nance, and Dr. Nils Averesch.

== Data Mining ==
In 2018, rather than conduct a HI-SEAS VII, NASA issued a new grant to support enhanced data mining of the previous five missions and analysis of a HI-SEAS database.

== See also ==
- Colonization of Mars
- Human mission to Mars
- ISS year-long mission
- List of Mars analogs
- Mars Society
- Mars to Stay
- Orion (spacecraft)
- Psychological and sociological effects of spaceflight
- Skylab 4
- Space Launch System
