= Kai Staats =

American entrepreneur

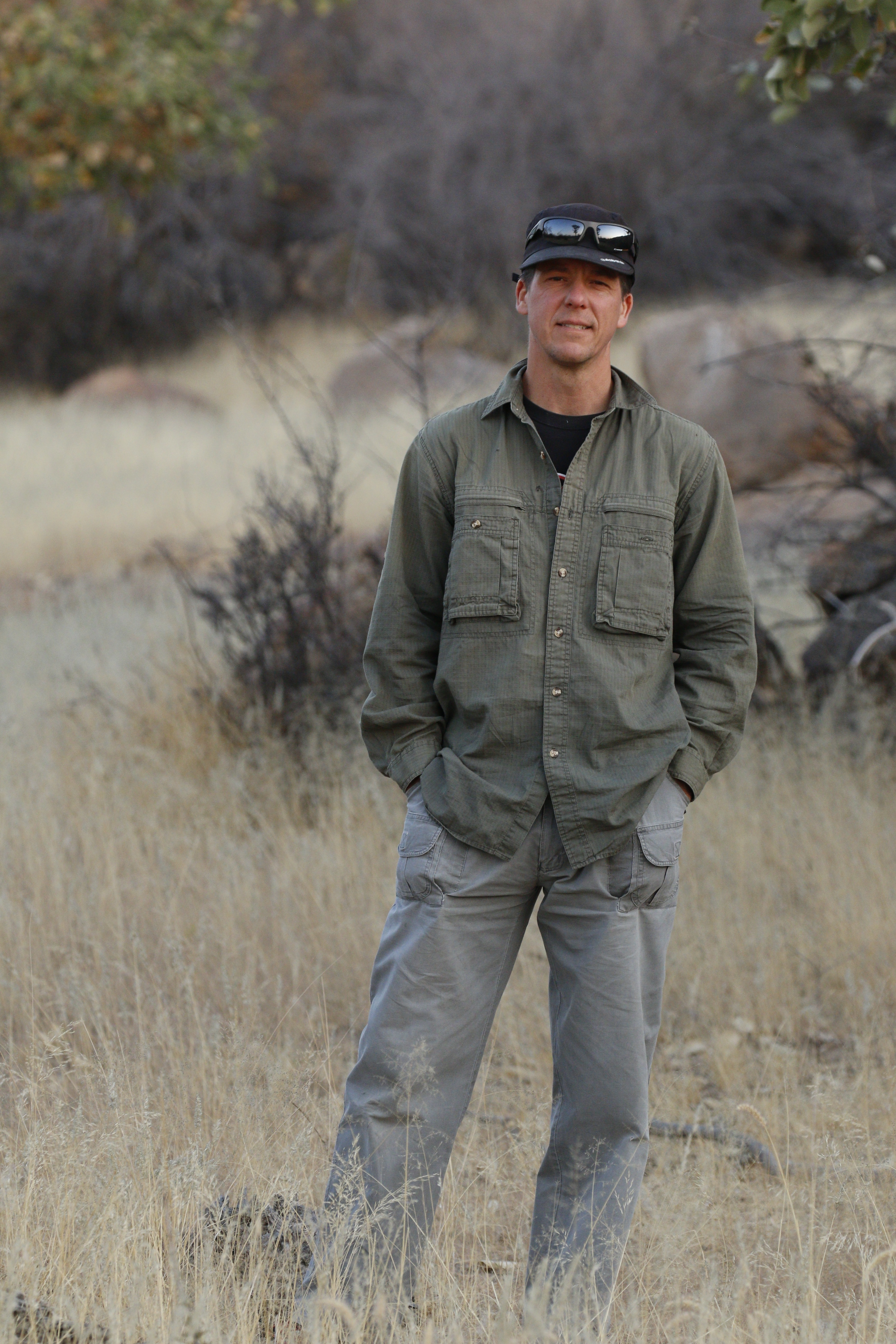
- Central Namibia game preserve, 2015
- Born: July 16, 1970 (age 56); Spearfish, South Dakota
- Website: www.kaistaats.com

Kai Kruse Staats is an entrepreneur, scientist, and filmmaker. From 2021 through May 2026 Staats was the Director of Research for the Space Analog for the Moon & Mars (SAM), having overseen the design and construction of this hermetically sealed and pressurized habitat research station located at the University of Arizona Biosphere 2.

At the Arizona State University School of Earth & Space Exploration, he contributed to the design of off-world human habitats as project lead for an Interplanetary Initiative Pilot Project called SIMOC, a research-grade computer simulation and instructional interface to a Mars habitat that is hosted by National Geographic.

His last film series, funded in part by the NSF, chronicled the first direct detection of gravitational waves in 2015 by LIGO, where he served as a visiting scientist.

Staats's work includes that done on iConji and Yellow Dog Linux.

== Career ==
In 1995 he founded Terra Firma Design (TFD) and continued as its sole proprietor until 2000. TFD provided website development and marketing consulting principally for companies located in Northern Colorado, including a corporate identity package for Western Telecommunications, Inc. (WTCI), website design and maintenance for New Belgium Brewing Company, and the re-design of the RB5X, an educational and hobbyist robot then produced by General Robotics Corporation.

In 1999 Staats co-founded, and for ten years served as CEO of Terra Soft Solutions, Inc. (TSS). TSS developed Yellow Dog Linux, a Linux operating system for the POWER architecture with support for embedded, desktop, and server chipsets by IBM and Freescale, and computer products by Apple, IBM, Sony, and others. Terra Soft delivered the desktop OS Yellow Dog Linux and turn-key high performance computing (HPC) solutions for DoE, DoD, NASA, and higher education customers. In 2008 Terra Soft was acquired by the Japanese company Fixstars and was renamed to Fixstars Solutions. Staats became the COO.

== Research ==
In 2016, at The Ohio State University, Staats co-organized and led a prototypal workshop for the application of evolutionary computation to astroparticle physics (CHEAPR). From 2017 through 2023, he was assisting Professor Amy Connolly and her colleagues at OSU and Cal Poly with a student project to develop evolutionary algorithms that evolve antenna designs for improved neutrino detection.

Staats was a visiting scientist at Northwestern University for the Laser Interferometer Gravitational-wave Observatory (LIGO) on the application of machine learning in detector characterization, noise mitigation, and transient (supernova), detection from late 2016 through mid 2020.

At the University of Arizona, Biosphere 2, he and his colleagues developed SAM, a terrestrial analog and prototype for an off-world habitat used for training and research to benefit a future space-dwelling humanity. The SAM habitat analog tests the viability of mechanical and plant-based life support, studies of the microbiome of a sealed environment, food cultivation in a sealed greenhouse, tool use during extra-vehicular activities in a pressurized space suit, developing a high-fidelity computer model to aid in the design of future habitats, and many other tasks are necessary to get ready for life in space.

== Filmography ==
Staats engaged in filmmaking at an early age. His first production, in 6th grade, was a ''LEGO-mation'' shot on 8mm film.

He transitioned to digital film in collaboration with his brother, Jae Staats. Together, they co-founded the Almost Famous Film Festival (A3F), which launched in 2005. His work in independent and later professional filmmaking began in 2011 at Holden Village, an isolated retreat center in the Washington Cascades.

From 2012 to 2014 he produced Monitor Gray, a short science fiction film based on three short stories he wrote in high school and college.

In 2013, Staats filmed and produced Chasing Asteroid 1998 QE2 for the South African Astronomical Observatory (SAAO), documenting their observations of this near-Earth interloper. In 2017, Staats returned to SAAO, producing a short film about the first detection of a fully multi-messenger event involving merging binary neutron stars.

In the fall of 2013 he was awarded his first contract with LIGO, the gravitational-wave observatory. LIGO, A Passion for Understanding is a 20-minute documentary film completed in April 2014. Subsequent NSF and university funding was provided for LIGO Generations in 2015, and LIGO Detection in 2017. LIGO Detection is distributed by the National Science Foundation's educational content library Science360, and related films are available at the LIGO multimedia archive. In 2015–16, Staats produced a documentary titled "I Am Palestine," which shares the stories of Palestinians who once lived side-by-side with Israeli neighbors. The film portrays a region now marked by uncertainty and conflict. It was screened at eight film festivals and won several awards, including at the NYC Indie Film Awards, Best Shorts Competition, and Best Short Documentary at the 2016 Cabo Verde International Film Festival.

In collaboration with Dr. Paul M. Sutter, Staats produced Song of the Stars, a film of the one-time live performance of a modern dance that tells the story of the first stars in the universe.
