= IConji =

Pictographic writing system

iConji
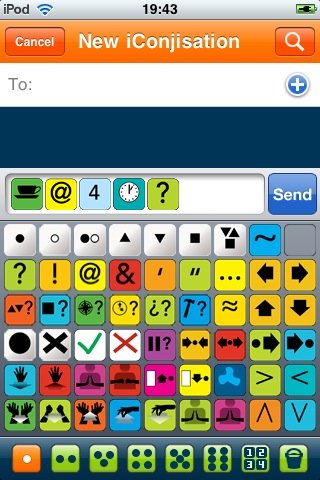
- Script type: Pictographic
- Creator: Kai Staats
- Created: 2009
- Period: 2009-2012
- Languages: None

Unicode
- Unicode range: Not in Unicode

iConji is a free pictographic communication system based on an open, visual vocabulary of characters with built-in translations for most major languages.

In May 2010 iConji Messenger was released with support for Apple iOS (iPhone, iPad, iPod) and most web browsers. Messenger enables point-to-point communication in a manner similar to SMS.

In December 2010, iConji Social was released as a web application only, with support for Facebook and Twitter as a broadcast medium. The application iConji Social supported delivery of iConji-enhanced messages via email.

iConji debuted with 1183 unique characters, known as the lexiConji (vocabulary), culled from base words used in common daily communications, word frequency lists, often-used mathematical and logical symbols, punctuation symbols, and the flags of all nations. The process of assembling a message from iConji characters is called iConjisation (see screenshot at right).

Since most characters represent an entire word or concept, rather than a single letter or character, iConji has the potential to be a more efficient communication system than SMS. The usual jumble of text and confusing abbreviations can often be replaced by a short string of colorful icons that convey the identical meaning.

With the iConji Messenger and iConji Social apps, characters are displayed at a resolution of 32 x 32 pixels, using color PNGs with transparency to round the corners. As all iConji characters are developed first as vector graphics, this allows essentially infinite scalability, whether for producing new online or smartphone apps, or full-size posters for printed graphic applications such as signs or electronic displays.

Thus, future iConji applications, from in-house or outside developers, may incorporate larger or smaller versions of the characters using the freely available iConji API.

In December 2012, further development of iConji was brought to a close. As of 2026, the app is unavailable.

== Overview ==
Kai Staats, founder and former CEO of Terra Soft Solutions, original developer of Yellow Dog Linux (YDL), was motivated to create a new communications system that combined the speed of SMS with the richness and linguistic depth of a global art project. His intent was to provide a means for communication that could bridge cultural divides. Thus, iConji is a pictographic communication system, not a spoken language.

The characters themselves are evocative of their meanings, and designed to be as cross-cultural as possible. It is a difficult task to even attempt to make pictographic symbols universal in their meaning. Further, not all cultures read symbols or text from left to right, which is the standard for iConji. In addition, some linguistic concepts are too abstract to represent graphically. The first row in the image above (The iConji user interface on an iPod.) shows characters for the pronouns (I, you, we, he, she, it, them), and the "tilde" which is defined as "to be" and its numerous conjugations (is, are, was, will be, and so on). These abstract concepts represent a significant barrier to universal pictographic representation, but the ability to read a translation in one's native language (if needed) can help bridge that gap. The character at far right is the "null" and can be used as a space, a placeholder, or a container for metadata.

Unique to iConji is its inclusion of both an inferred meaning, suggested by the pictographs themselves, and the translations that accompany each character. At the close of 2010, these translations included English, French, German, Hindi, Italian, Japanese, Polish, Spanish, Swahili, Swedish, and Toki Pona. There is no practical limit to the number of languages that could be translated and included.

Likewise, there is no limit to the number of individual characters that could be incorporated. The iConji vocabulary is open to revision - anyone in the world may design and contribute new characters for use in global communications. Through the Artist Community, users are able to add their own characters to the lexiConji (with approval), or revise existing character icons they feel could be better represented graphically.

== Implementation ==
The screenshot above shows most features and functionality of the iConji application. Starting at top right, the search icon (magnifying glass) opens a text field in the dark blue window that allows a text search for specific characters. Below that is the "To:" field, where the recipient can be inserted from a built-in address book. Below that is another field where selected iConji characters can be assembled into a string to compose the message (iConjisation).

The next section down is a 6x9 matrix of characters from which the user can select specific characters. In the iOS applications this is accomplished by a finger-tap; in the browser application by a point-and-click. In both cases, a hover pops up a small box displaying the definition of the character in the user's declared language.

The bottom-most line consists of what are called buckets. Each user-customizable bucket contains another 54 characters that can be grouped by type or frequency of use. The seventh bucket contains 54 commonly used mathematical and logical symbols. The eighth bucket is "bottomless" and serves as a repository for all other characters, with no limit to the number contained. Selecting that bucket generates a scrollable list of those characters. "It is the user's customization of these buckets that enables iConji to rival or exceed SMS in terms of efficiency and speed."

== Inflections ==
A few other modern pictographic systems use inflection symbols to expand meanings, for example, Blissymbolics. iConji includes inflections for present, past, or future tense verbs, adjectives, adverbs, and possessives. The user can also add metadata, if desired, to clarify the meaning or include additional text content. All inflections are indicated as glyphs at standardized positions around the base and top of the iConji character. In most cases the inflection should be apparent from context, but for messages where ambiguity could arise, inflections provide a means to remove that ambiguity.

For example, the gallery below shows four inflected variations of the character defined as "start, to start."

start (noun)

to start (verb)

did start (past)

will start (future)

started (adjective)

Many iConji characters follow this noun + infinitive verb format to enable unambiguous translation from its base English into other languages. Given the widely varying conventions for verb conjugation found in other languages, this is arguably the most flexible way to present a base definition.

== Examples ==
The sample iConjisation shown on the screenshot translates as follows:

coffee

at

four

o'clock

question

This demonstrates clearly how meaning can be conveyed using a minimal number of characters. The fourth character is formally defined as "clock, time" but would be interpreted as "o'clock" when used in this context. If the sender and receiver usually meet for coffee at the same location, no other information is needed. If the intended location is different from the usual, the iConjisation could be changed to:

coffee

at + meta

four

o'clock

question

Here, the triangular inflection mark on the second character (at) indicates the presence of metadata in that character. Metadata can be added or accessed via a text box pop-up by clicking on the character, and could include a business name, address, GPS coordinates, or other information. Alternatively, the sender can convey more specific location instructions using the characters themselves, for example:

coffee

at

my

house

four

o'clock

question

In this example, the third character (I, me) has been inflected with the possessive modifier, changing the meaning to "my." The two instances of the "@" character are included for grammatical clarity, but could likely be excluded without changing the interpreted meaning. In all of these examples, the recipient's response could be similarly concise, as the following three examples show:

sounds

good

or
arrive

early

or simply
Yes
yes

In the first response, we see the flexibility of the iConji system, as well as some word-play. The first character is formally defined as "sound, audio" and can thus be used in many contexts. The second character is formally defined as "angelic, saintly, good" implying the overall meaning "sounds good."

In the second response, additional information is returned by the recipient requesting the sender to "arrive early" using the adverb modifier on "early." Whether the adverb modifier is really needed is a matter of question since, between frequent users, certain conventions will become established by previous usage.

In the final and most concise response, only a single character (yes) is returned by the recipient.

== Artist Community ==
In February 2011 iConji launched its Artist Community. Anyone who saw the need for a new character, or a better version of an existing character, was encouraged to create and submit a unique design. There were several criteria for acceptance of a submitted character, but the process was made simple using freely available online graphic templates, instructions, and examples.

Character icons were created as vector graphics in tools such as Adobe Illustrator, CorelDRAW, or the free online application SVG-edit. Alternatively, the proposed character icon could be hand-drawn, scanned as a 300 dpi bitmap, and converted to vector graphics format before being submitted as a potential addition to the iConji vocabulary.

Definitions for the characters also follow a strict format and, where ambiguities could exist, need to follow a format that utilizes extended definitions to remove those ambiguities, both for users and translators. For example:

- miss [the salutation for an unmarried female]
- miss [the feeling of sorrow resulting from someone or something lost]
- miss, to miss [the act of not connecting with a target or goal]

Note how the last example again defaults to the “noun + infinitive verb” format mentioned above.

The artist also had the opportunity, if desired, to associate metadata with their character explaining the story behind the design, who they are, and their country of residence. Once accepted, the character was made available for use globally, by all iConji users. The artist had the ability to track the use of their character using the iConji Explorer application on the iConji website (no longer maintained).

The first iConji Communications workshop was held at Colorado State University on April 7, 2011. 40 participants representing a dozen countries convened to discuss the cross-cultural potential of this pictographic system. Over 100 new pictographs were designed and entered into the iConji vocabulary.

== Fate ==
As of 2026, the iConji home page describes the project as having been discontinued in 2012, and includes an outdated note suggesting there had been plans to revive the app in 2019. As of 2026, the app remains unavailable.

== See also ==
- Emoji
- Blissymbolics
- Sitelen Pona
- Pictograms
