= Terrestrial analogue site =

Places on Earth used to mimic extraterrestrial locations

Terrestrial analogue sites (also called "space analogues") are places on Earth with assumed past or present geological, environmental or biological conditions of a celestial body such as the Moon or Mars. Analogue sites are used in the frame of space exploration to either study geological or biological processes observed on other planets, or to prepare astronauts for surface extra-vehicular activity.

== Definition ==
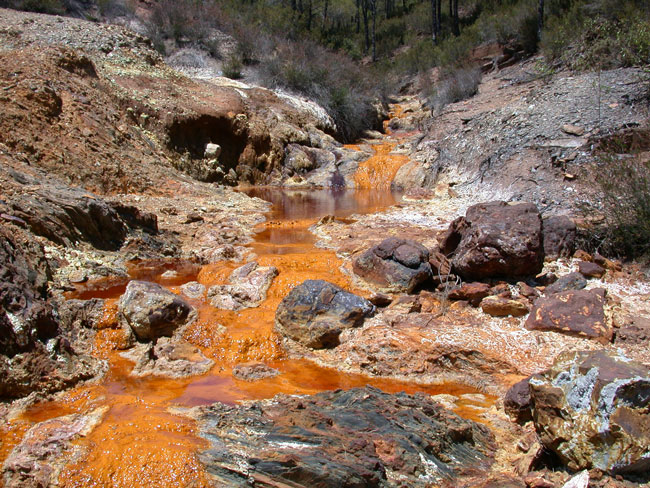
Rio Tinto analogue site that gained recent scientific interest due to the presence of extremophile aerobic bacteria that dwell in the water

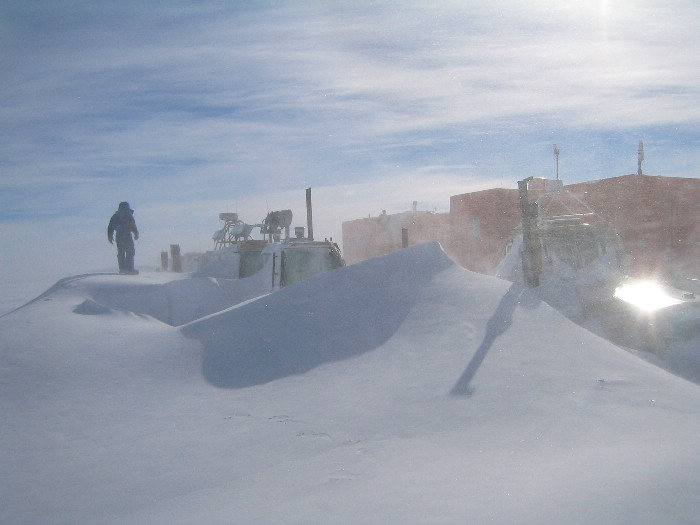
Antarctic analogue Concordia Station, where temperatures can drop down to -80 °C

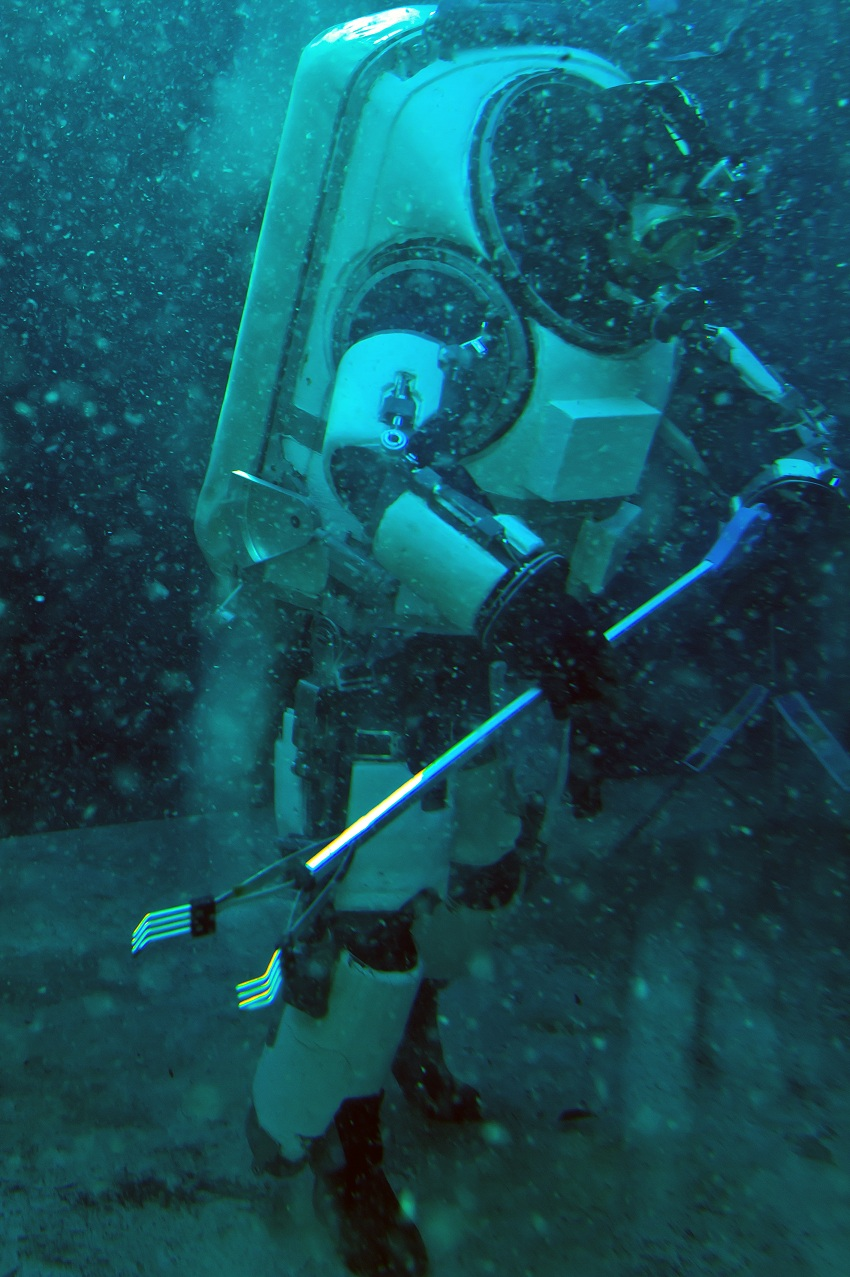
Underwater lunar surface EVA training by COMEX in Marseilles

Analogue sites are places on Earth with assumed, past or present, geological, environmental or biological conditions of a celestial body. Analogue site studies are necessary because they help to understand geological processes (on Earth) which can be extrapolated to other Solar System bodies in order to interpret and validate the data received from orbiters or planetary rovers. Analogue sites are also important for optimizing scientific and technological needs and exploration strategies in robotic or crewed missions to the Moon or Mars. The definition of space analogues is therefore rather vast, reaching from places on Earth that exhibit geologic or atmospheric characteristics which are close to those observed on other celestial bodies, to sites that are used for space mission simulations to test sampling or drilling equipment, space suits, or the performance of astronauts in reduced gravity.

Some sites are therefore suited to test instruments for exobiological research or to train sampling procedures for field explorations. Other sites offer an extreme environment that can be used by astronauts to prepare for the difficulties in future space missions.

=== Fidelity ===
An important notion in the evaluation of analogue sites is that of "fidelity", which describes the resemblance of the analogue to its extraterrestrial correspondent. Fidelity is used in comparative planetary science to express the analogy of a terrestrial site to a target extraterrestrial surface. This classification is possible based on various criteria such as geomorphology, geochemistry, exobiology or exploration conditions.

==== Geomorphology ====
Geomorphology is the scientific study of landforms and the processes that shape them. In terms of analogue sites, scientists search for locations on Earth that exhibit similar landforms such as can be found on exploration targets like the Moon, Mars or even asteroids and comets. The idea is to confront astronauts, robots or scientific equipment with sites that resemble in their geologic appearance those extraterrestrial surfaces. Examples are volcanic sites which resemble lunar terrain (regolith), polar locations and glaciers that can be compared to the poles of Mars or of Jupiter moon Europa, or terrestrial lava tubes which can also be found on the Moon or Mars.

==== Geochemistry ====
Geochemistry is the science that uses the principles of chemistry to explain the mechanisms behind major geological systems. The aspect of geochemistry is of importance for analogue sites when locations offer the possibility to test analysis instruments for future space missions (crewed or robotic). Geochemical fidelity is also of importance for the development and test of equipment used for in-situ resource utilization. Examples for such analogue sites are terrestrial volcanoes that offer rocks similar to those found on the Moon or hematite concretions which can be found in Earth deserts and also on Mars (so-called "Blueberries").

==== Exobiology ====
Exobiology or astrobiology is the study of the origin and evolution of extraterrestrial life. In terrestrial analogues efforts are put on the identification of so-called extremophile organisms, which are life forms that live and survive in extreme conditions such as can be found on other planets or moons. The objective of this research is to understand how such organisms survive and how they can be identified (or their remnants).

Examples of exobiology analogue sites are the Rio Tinto in Spain, which hosts bacteria that can survive high temperatures and harsh chemical conditions, or black smokers in the deep sea that host colonies of life forms in high-pressure and high-temperature conditions. The cold dry hyperarid core of the Atacama desert is one of the closest analogues for Martian surface conditions and is often used for testing rovers and life detection equipment that one day may be sent to Mars. Other extreme environments, such as the polar regions, high-altitude mountainous areas, or remote islands are also used in studies to better understanding of life under such conditions. Scientists can test at such analogue sites sampling equipment designed to search and identify lifeforms.

==== Exploration conditions ====
Another criterion to search for analogue sites are locations where the exploration conditions of future astronauts can be simulated. Future explorers of the Moon or Mars will have to handle various conditions, such as reduced gravity, radiation, work in pressurized space suits and extreme temperatures. Preparing astronauts for these conditions calls for training on sites that exhibit some of those conditions. The operations that can be simulated reach from living in isolation, to extra-vehicular activity (EVA) in reduced gravity to the construction of habitats. Examples for analogue sites that offer such exploration conditions are research stations at the poles or underwater EVA training as it is done at NEEMO by NASA, at the Marseilles subsea analogue by COMEX, or by using parabolic flights to simulate lower gravity for shorter durations. Underwater analogue sites allow for the training of astronauts in neutral buoyancy conditions (such as is done in test pools at NASA, ESA or Star City in Russia) while operating on a natural terrain. Potential targets for such training are missions to the Moon and Mars, to test sampling, drilling and field explorations in 1/6th or 1/3rd of Earth's gravity, or asteroids, and to test anchoring systems in microgravity.

== History of the space analogues ==
The notion of space analogues is not new. NASA has used such sites for a long time to train its astronauts for space missions. The following data are taken from the official website of NASA.

The first analog mission was undertaken in 1997 in Arizona. Since then, NASA leads annual missions there to evaluate and test EVAs and outpost systems and operations. This site was chosen to test the materials in a desolate environment with rugged terrain, dust storms, extreme temperatures...

In the same year, the Haughton-Mars Project (HMP) was started on Devon Island in the Arctic. Since then, 14 missions have been conducted there to test technology and operations in a remote, extreme environment and conduct science research on the Mars-like terrain.

In 2001, NASA conducted the mission named NEEMO near Florida, 62 feet (19 m) underwater, that was supposed to be a simulation for six aquanauts living in a confined space. It was also the way to test the exploration equipment in an extreme and isolated environment. Since 2001, 14 missions have been undertaken there in a multi-organizational environment.

Since 2004, two-week missions are conducted every summer in Pavilion Lake in Canada. This analogue site allows astronauts to train in searching for evidence of life in an extreme environment with reduced-gravity conditions. This is an international and multi-organizational project conducted underwater.

The last analogue site used by NASA is at Mauna Kea on the Big Island of Hawaii, after which an analogue base under the name of HI-SEAS was founded on Mauna Loa. In total, six NASA missions have started in this base between 2013 and 2018, until the sixth HI-SEAS mission was halted due to a medical emergency. This project was led to test technologies for sustaining human exploration on desolate planetary surfaces like the Moon or Mars and explore social wellbeing and crew dynamics on long-duration missions. HI-SEAS is currently under management of the International Moonbase Alliance, founded by Henk Rogers.

Keen interest for space analogues has emerged through the student community, the 2017 NASA Ames Grand Prize Winning entry Anastasi, explores the possibility of an underwater settlement as a preliminary to space settlement infrastructure.

== Objectives ==
The history of the use of terrestrial analogues shows the importance attached to using analogue sites in validating spatial technologies and scientific instruments. But analogue sites also have other uses:

=== Training ===
Space analogues can help to train personnel in using technologies and instruments, and in knowing how to behave with a spacesuit. Thus two types of analogue sites exist: underwater sites and surface sites.

- Underwater sites simulate a reduced-gravity environment by compensating weight by the Archimedes' principle, thus simulating zero gravity or reduced gravity (lunar gravity, for example).
- Surface sites serve to train astronauts to walk and move within a spacesuit, and to test the Mars Exploration Rover (for example). Expeditions to surface sites also help teach geology to astronauts, who mostly trained as pilots.

=== Exobiology ===
Space analogues may have potential similarities to environments for exobiology. In some places on Earth the conditions allow only certain types of organisms - extremophile organisms - to live.

== Currently used space analogues ==
Following table lists currently used space analogues on Earth.

List of currently used analogue sites
Location name	Coordinates (decimal)	Description	Geomorphological Fidelity	Geochemistry Fidelity	Exobiological Fidelity	Exploration Conditions Fidelity
Space Analog for the Moon and Mars (SAM), Oracle, Arizona, USA SAM at Biosphere 2 (the United States)	32.579490, -110.848042	Located at the base of Santa Catalina Mountains, on the campus of the University of Arizona Biosphere 2 at 3800 feet elevation. A hi-fidelty, hermetically sealed and pressurized research vessel consisting of airlock, engineering bay, crew quarters, greenhouse, and system for pressure regulation. Indoor and outdoor Mars yard are in development.	Mars; 12,000 sq-ft (1115 sq-m) outdoor Mars yard sculpted per mission; 3200 sq-ft (300 sq-m) indoor Mars yard and terrain park with fine-grained basalt and varied terrain beds and features for pressure suit, rover, and drone tests and exploration; synthetic lava tube being constructed fall of 2023. Basalt bed is geologically accurate. Additional sedimentary and metamorphic terrain provide varied topology and navigation challenges.	Mars; Basalt dust was built from crushed volcanic rock (northern Arizona) with minimal original organic material for the Biosphere 2 Landscape Evolution Observatory (LEO) experiment.	n/a	Surface EVA. Pressurized space suits engaged for all EVAs. Indoor Mars yard offers "reduced gravity" via gravity off-set rig. Confinement. Confinement in isolated space habitat. Programmed, delayed communication. Habitat and LSS. Installed space habitat simulation for days to months. Hermetically sealed, pressurized. On-site Mission Control Center includes officer desks, data and communications monitoring.
Mars Desert Research Station, US Mars Desert Research Station (the United States)	38.406458, -110.791903	Located in the Utah desert, close to the road 24 at 11.6 km from Hanksville. Disposes of a space habitat simulator. The research station, a Mars Society's station, consists of three buildings, the Habitat, the Greenhab, the Musk Mars Desert Observatory and a remotely located Engineering Support Equipment Area.	Moon; Sand Mars; Rocky ground with dust devils	Mars; Marine shales, coals, sulfates, carbonates and quartz rocks	Mars; Extremophile organisms (drought and high temperatures)	Surface EVA; EVA in terrestrial gravity. Confinement Confinement in isolated space habitat. Habitat and LSS Installed space habitat simulation.
Devon Island, Canada Haughton impact Crater (Canada)	75.383333, -89.666667	Crater located on the Devon island, the Haughton Crater resembles the Mars surface in more ways than any other place on Earth. It is an international and multidisciplinary site where temperatures are cold. Need of a boat to reach the island and the crater. Mars-like landscape of dry, unvegetated, rocky terrain and extreme for testing planetary exploration strategies, such as safety environmental conditions. HMP (Haughton Mars Project) undertaken by NASA since 1997.	Moon; Analogy with Shackleton Crater, a 19-km-wide impact crater at the Moon's South Pole Mars; Loose rock, craters, ground ice, rock glaciers, ancient hot springs and lakes, gullies, sapping valleys, valley networks, and canyons.	Mars; Quartz rocks, shales and allochthonous breccia	Mars; Permafrost (evidence of water in the past) Outer Moons; Permafrost	Surface EVA; EVA in terrestrial gravity. Habitat and LSS Simulation in extreme conditions, lack of installations and isolation.
Svalbard, Norway Svalbard (Arctic)	78.00, 16.00	Located in Arctic, the environmental and topological geography are very close to Mars. This site is located in a volcanic region with very low temperatures. The Arctic Mars Analog Svalbard Expedition (AMASE) was undertaken by NASA since 2003.	Moon; Red sandstone Mars; Rocky ground, rough field, rock glaciers, volcanic center, hot springs, perennial rivers, gaps and folds	Moon; Volcanic rocks (basalt) Mars; Shale	Mars; Extremophile organisms (extreme temperatures)	Surface EVA; EVA in terrestrial gravity. Confinement Confinement during an exercise, no communication between the two teams. Habitat and LSS Simulation in extreme conditions, lack of installations and isolation.
Rio Tinto, Spain Rio Tinto (Spain)	37.40396, -6.33576	Located in Spain, this desert crossed by the river Rio Tinto has an environmental and topographical geography close to that of Mars. There is no vegetation, and temperatures are between 10 °C and 20 °C, which allows a certain stability in temperature. This site is very easy to reach, thanks to its proximity with a big road and a town.	Moon; Red sandstone Mars; Meridiani Planum and rocky ground	Mars; Iron (pyrite) and sulfide minerals	Mars extremophile aerobic bacteria (extreme environment), chemolithotrophic microorganisms	Surface EVA; EVA in terrestrial gravity.
McMurdo Dry Valleys, Antarctica McMurdo Dry Valleys (Antarctica)	-77.466667, 162.516667	Located in Antarctica, those valleys are snow-free valleys. They are located close to the McMurdo base, which is an advantage for the facilities. The environment is extreme because of the very low temperatures (from -50 to 8 °C). This site has been used by the NASA from January 2008 to February 2009 to test an inflatable habitat in an extreme environment.	Moon; Dry and cold Mars; Dry, cold, rocky ground and valleys	Moon granite Mars; Iron	Moon; Endolithic photosynthetic bacteria (extreme temperatures) Mars; Anaerobic organism (metabolism based on iron and sulfur)	Surface EVA; EVA in terrestrial gravity. Confinement Confinement for the team (no communication, isolation). Habitat and LSS Simulation in extreme conditions.
Atacama Desert, Chile Atacama Desert (South America)	-24.5, -69.25	Located in Chile, this desert is the Driest and oldest Desert on Earth. Characterized by different environments that differ in the amount of water available for life (Atacama Coastal Range, the hyperarid core of the Atacama and the Andes Mountains) the hyperarid core contains some of the driest sites on Earth, with some, like María Elena South, been as dry as Mars. The Atacama Desert is also characterized by its highly saline soils, rich in highly oxidizing species such as perchlorates, as well as by being the most UV irradiated region on Earth.	Moon sand Mars; Otherworldly appearance of the soil	Mars; Perchlorates	Mars; Extremophile organisms (extreme temperatures)	Surface EVA; EVA in terrestrial gravity. Confinement Confinement during the mission (far from the civilisation) Habitat and LSS Simulation in extreme conditions.
Meteor Crater, US Meteor Crater (the United States)	35.027222, -111.0225	This crater is a private site that belongs to the Barringer's Family. It is a well-known crater but it access to the site requires to pay a tax to the family. Its location in Arizona near the Highway 40 implies that it is very easy to reach with a truck. It is located at 69 km from Flagstaff. During the 1960s, NASA astronauts trained in the crater to prepare for the Apollo missions to the Moon.	Moon; Sandstone Mars; Rocky ground	Mars; Dolomite, coesite and stishovite	Mars; Extremophile organisms (extreme temperatures)	Surface EVA; EVA in terrestrial gravity. Habitat and LSS Simulation in extreme conditions.
Kīlauea Volcano, US Kilauea Volcano (America)	19.425, -155.291944	The Kilauea Volcano is located on the Big island of Hawaii. This island is composed of different mountains due to the volcanic activity in this region. The climate is tropical and temperatures are cool and stable (from 10 to 20 °C). Because of the tropical climate, it rains between November and April. The NASA has already tested some technologies on the neighbouring site of Mauna Kea.	Moon; Volcanic dust Mars; Volcanic center and folds	Moon; Volcanic rocks (basalt) Mars; Silica	Mars; Extremophile organisms (extreme environment)	Surface EVA; EVA in terrestrial gravity. Habitat and LSS Simulation in extreme conditions, production of oxygen from the soil.
Sudbury Crater, Canada Sudbury Crater (Canada)	46.6, -81.183333	Located in Ontarion (Canada), this crater has a particularity: in its center there is a town called Greater Sudbury. Temperatures in this region are between -5 and 15 °C. This site is very easy to reach and the proximity with the town implies that it is easy to deploy teams there.	Mars; Rocky ground	Moon; Pseudotachylite Mars; Nickel and metals		Surface EVA; EVA in terrestrial gravity. Habitat and LSS Simulation in cold conditions.
Teide National Park, Spain Teide Volcanic Park (Africa)	28.263, -16.616	Located on the island called Tenerife that belongs to Spain. The site itself belongs to the national park which is composed of two volcanoes. The Teide National Park is a well-known park and well-preserved and the temperatures are cool (between 10 and 30 °C).	Mars; Rocky ground, gaps and folds	Moon; Volcanic rocks (basalt and phonolite) Mars; Same rocks on Mars and on the site	Mars; Test of ultraviolet light to detect life on Mars	Surface EVA; EVA in terrestrial gravity.
LMAS (Lunar Mars Analogue Site) Sainte-Rose, Réunion, France Sainte-Rose (Africa)	-21.243622, 55.713751	Located in the Reunion (French island close to Madagascar), the site of Sainte-Rose includes the volcano "Piton de la Fournaise". It is close to the town, east of the island. The volcano is still active.	Moon; Plain of sands (Moon-like hills) Mars; Volcanic center, gaps and folds	Moon; Volcanic rocks (basalt) Mars; Iridium		Surface EVA; EVA in terrestrial gravity. Habitat and LSS Simulation in volcanic conditions.
Concordia Station, Antarctica Concordia station (Antarctica)	-75.1, 123.558	Located in Antarctica, the Concordia Station is a Franco-Italian research center. Its location is very far from any other station (the closest station is about 550 km—Russia's Vostok Station). On the site, temperatures are freezing cold (from −82 °C to −48 °C). This station is operational since 2005 and is used to study medicine, glaciology and astronomy.	Moon; Ice, meteorite dust		Mars; Extremophile organisms (extreme temperatures)	Surface EVA; EVA in terrestrial gravity and extreme environment. Confinement Concordia station is particularly useful for the study of chronic hypobaric hypoxia, stress secondary to confinement and isolation. Habitat and LSS Simulation in extreme conditions and analogue used to train for long duration deep space missions.
Pavilion Lake, Canada Pavilion Lake (Canada)	50.86502, -121.737442	Located in Canada, this site is an underwater space analogue used by different nations (Canada and USA). The project undertaken there is entitled the Pavilion Lake Research Project. This is an international and multidisciplinary project that exists since 2004 every summer. The main mission of this project is to learn from and practice doing science field activities, including searching for evidence of life, in an extreme environment with reduced gravity conditions. The advantage of the lake is that there is no swell and a calm water what makes simulation safer and can be used util 65 meters deep.	Moon; Sand Mars; Rocky ground	Mars; Carbonate	Mars; Microbialities	Surface EVA; EVA in reduced, zero or negative gravity. Habitat and LSS Simulation in underwater conditions and stress (problem of oxygen).
Gros Morne National Park, Canada Gros Morne National Park (Canada)	49.621667, -57.752778	Located on an island in Canada, this site belongs to the Gros Morne National Park, which is a well-known park. The park is quite isolated and far from any town. Temperatures are between -13.3 and 19.6 °C.	Mars; Rocky ground, rough field and glacial valleys	Moon; Oceanic crust (basalt and gabbro) Mars; Quartzite		Surface EVA; EVA in terrestrial gravity.
Laguna de Tirez, Spain Laguna de Tirez (Spain)	39.538238, -3.357825	Located in Spain, this site is a lagoon with a depth of 20 meters and is at a distance of 110 km from Madrid. Temperatures there are cool (-0,4 to 25,8 °C) and the site is near the town of Villacañas and is easy to reach thanks to the roads around.	Mars; Rocky ground and hot springs	Mars; Iron, sulfates and magnesium	Mars; Acetoclastic Sulfate-Reducing Bacteria and Hydrogenotrophic Methanogenic Archaea	Surface EVA; EVA in reduced, zero or negative gravity. Habitat and LSS Simulation in underwater conditions.
NEEMO, US NEEMO (the United States)	24.95, -80.453611	Located in the US, at 5,6 km off Key Largo in Florida, this site is an underwater space analogue and is 19 meters deep. NEEMO, which means NASA Extreme Environment Mission Operations, is a project undertaken by the NASA to allow six aquanauts to live and worke in a cramped, submerged laboratory to simulate crewed exploration in a hostile environment, with support from surface infrastructure. This mission exists since 2001.	Moon; Sand			Surface EVA; EVA in reduced, zero or negative gravity. Confinement Confinement up to three weeks in the laboratory. Habitat and LSS Simulation in underwater conditions and isolation.
Marseille Bay, France Terrestrial analogue site (France)	43.263956, 5.330772	Underwater analogue sites for the simulation of surface EVA in reduced gravity.	Moon; Sand Mars; Rocky ground, vertical cliffs and caves			Surface EVA; EVA in reduced, zero or negative gravity. Habitat and LSS Simulation in underwater conditions.
HI-SEAS, US	19.602091, -155.487224	Volcanic analogue site for human and robotic EVA. HI-SEAS was designed to house a crew of up to six people for long duration missions (1 year+), although is currently mainly used for short to mid-duration human missions (2 weeks to 1–2 months). This base is run by the International Moonbase Alliance since early 2019.	Moon; Sand, lava flows, lava tubes. Mars; Rocky ground, lava flows, lava tubes,	Moon; Basalts, extrusive flows Mars; Basalts, extrusive flows, (inside lava tubes; carbonates and gypsum)	Mars; Fresh volcanic soils, tholeiitic basalts, lava tubes, high-radiation.	Surface EVA; EVA in terrestrial gravity, but 'extraterrestrial' surface. Confinement Confinement up to a year (366 days) in the habitat. Habitat and LSS Simulation in remote location and stress and environmental monitoring.
CHILL-ICE, Iceland	64.7869, -20.7144	Volcanic analogue site to test human robotic (co)operation inside a lava tube. Set as a research-based mission, two missions have been held thus far, of several days each. Its main purpose is to define the feasibility of portable systems and their deployment inside lava tubes.	Moon; Rocky ground, lava flows, lava tubes. Mars; Rocky ground, lava flows, lava tubes,	Moon; Basalts, extrusive flows Mars; Basalts, extrusive flows, (inside lava tubes; carbonates and gypsum)	Mars; Fresh volcanic soils, tholeiitic basalts, lava tubes.	Surface EVA; EVA in extreme environments, subsurface, and in complete dark. Confinement Confinement in a cave system, without access to sunlight.
Asclepios, Switzerland	- (several locations)	Student-led project from the EPFL to study human survival and demonstrate the different roles and tasks concerned with an (analogue) space mission. The first mission was held underground in 2021 in the Swiss Alps.	Moon Mars (Depends on the location)	Moon Mars (Depends on the location)		Confinement Confinement for short duration missions. Habitat and LSS Underground facility.
LunAres, Poland	53.1745, 16.7261	A privately owned research facility close to Pila, Poland. Hosting researchers for mid-duration missions (typically 2 weeks) inside their simulation habitat, with an indoor EVA area.	Moon Soils, rocks. Mars; Soils, sand, rocks.			Surface EVA; Indoor EVA capabilities to support crew dynamics.
Analog Astronaut Training Center, Poland, www.astronaut.center	(several locations)	Educational and scientific internships related with development and testing of new technologies for human spaceflight and commercial space tourism.	Deep space analog research in isolation (regolith simulant)			
Mt. Etna, Sicily, Italy Location of Mt. Etna, Italy.	37.73,15.01 - 37.76, 14.99 (larger area)	Volcanic analogue site with fresh volcanic soils, lava flows, and pristine environments. ESA and DLR have tested several rovers and robotic operations here.	Moon Soils, rocks, volcanoclastics. Mars; Sand, soils, fresh volcanic rocks.		Mars; Microbialities, extremophilic life forms	Surface EVA; Volcanic systems, lava tubes, fresh volcanic soils

== See also ==
- Martian regolith simulant
- Lunar regolith simulant
- Present day Mars habitability analogue environments on Earth
- Planetary Science
- Planetary Habitability
