= Fixstars Solutions =

American technology company

Fixstars Solutions, Inc.

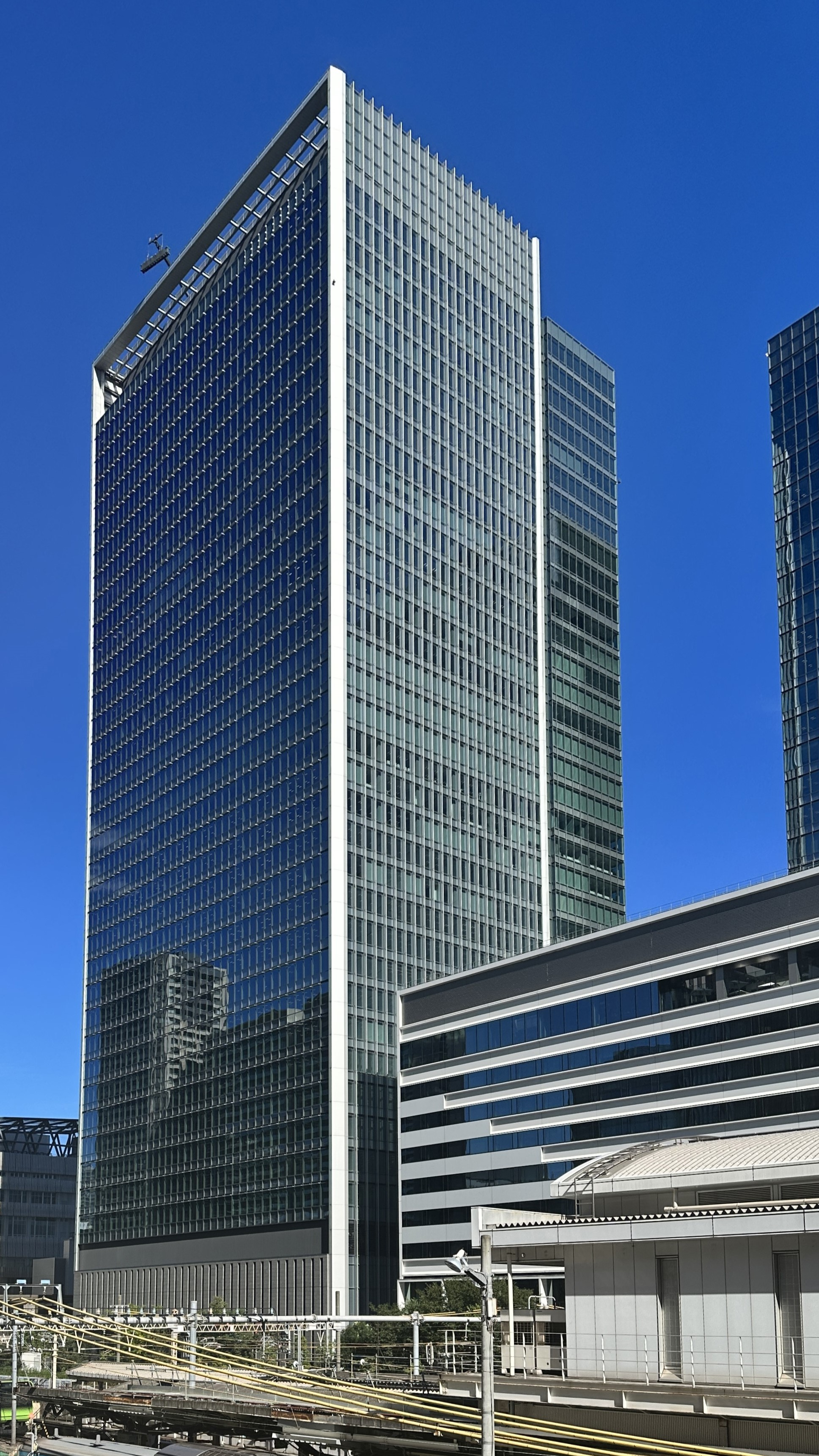
- Fixstars's headquarters at Tamachi Station Tower in Shibaura, Tokyo
- Type: Private, subsidiary of Fixstars Corporation
- Industry: Operating systems, Services, Software
- Founded: 1999 in California US, 2008 reestablishments
- Headquarters: Tokyo, Japan
- Products: Yellow Dog Linux, Accelcoder, GigaAccel 180, High-Capacity SSDs
- Website: www.fixstars.com/en/

Fixstars Solutions, Inc. is a software and services company specializing in multi-core processors, particularly in Nvidia's GPU and CUDA environment, IBM Power7, and Cell. They also specialize in solid-state drives and currently manufacture the world's largest SATA drives.

During the early part of 2010, Fixstars developed a strong relationship with Nvidia and focused its linux distribution for GPU computing. Yellow Dog Enterprise Linux for CUDA is the first enterprise Linux OS optimized for GPU computing. It offers end users, developers and integrators a faster, more reliable, and less complex GPU computing experience.

== Terra Soft acquisition ==
On November 11, 2008, Japanese company Fixstars announced that it had acquired essentially all of Terra Soft's assets. Terra Soft's former founder and CEO Kai Staats was appointed as COO of Fixstars's new American subsidiary, Fixstars Solutions, which is based in Irvine, California. Fixstars Solutions retained Terra Soft's product line, staff and regional offices in Loveland, Colorado.

Terra Soft provided software and services for the PowerPC/Power ISA and Linux OS platform. Former Terra Soft Solutions produced Yellow Dog Linux (YDL) and Yellow Dog Enterprise Linux which included cluster construction tools. Customers included Argonne, Sandia, Lawrence Livermore, and Los Alamos National Labs, several Department of Defense contractors including Boeing, Lockheed Martin, and SAIC; the U.S. Air Force, Navy, Army, and NASA; and many of the top universities around the world including California Institute of Technology, MIT, and Stanford University.

As an Apple value-added reseller and IBM Business Partner, Terra Soft Solutions provided turnkey and build-to-order desktop workstations, servers, and High Performance Computing clusters. Terra Soft made their Yellow Dog Linux distribution solely for PowerPC/Power ISA, optimizing the distributions for AltiVec and the Cell.

Terra Soft was the first to support a variety of Apple computers with Linux pre-installed (under a unique license with Apple). When Apple abandoned PowerPC CPUs in favor of the Intel Core chips, Terra Soft was able to concentrate on high-performance computing and the Cell Broadband Engine, working closely with IBM and Sony for the PlayStation 3 products.

In 2006, Terra Soft was contracted by Sony to provide a Linux operating system for the PlayStation 3, used by several University researchers as an inexpensive, powerful cluster compute node.

In 2009 Fixstars released CodecSys CE-10 H.264, an H.264 software encoder running on PlayStations 3 from a USB key or live CD of Yellow Dog Linux, to provide faster than real-time H.264 video encoding using the PS3 Cell microprocessor.

Today, Fixstars of Tokyo, Japan carries forward the Yellow Dog Linux and Yellow Dog Enterprise Linux product line with primary focus on heterogeneous, multi-core CPUs such as the Cell Broadband Engine and Nvidia GPU.

== Hardware ==
=== YDL PowerStation ===
Terra Soft launched the YDL PowerStation also known as the Yellow Dog Linux (YDL) PowerStation on June 10, 2008, with a base price of $1,895.

The YDL PowerStation offers:

- Four IBM 970 MP cores clocked at 2.5 GHz
- 8 DDR2 (PC2-5300P) slots for up to 32 GB memory
- Can unofficially be expanded to 64 GB of memory with 8 GB DIMMs.
- Extended ATX motherboard
- Single IDE controller
- IDE DVD/CD-RW drive
- 4 SAS hot-swap drive bays
- Two x8 PCIe slots, One x16 PCIe slot, One PCI-X slot
- ATI X1650 Pro with 2 DVI ports and 512 MB of video memory
- 2 Broadcom HT2000/BCM5780 Gigabit Ethernet ports
- 4 USB v2.0 ports
- 2 RS-232 serial ports
- YDL PowerStation comes pre-installed with Yellow Dog Linux v6.0
- No audio adapter is included

=== Fixstars GigaAccel 180 (IBM PXCAB) ===
Fixstars GigaAccel 180 (IBM PXCAB) is an accelerator board based on IBM's PowerXCell 8i processor.

- 4 GB of DDR2 SDRAM
- Two 1 Gigabit Ethernet ports
- One x16 PCI Express interface
- Serial port
