= Space Analog for the Moon and Mars =

Terrestrial analog site in Arizona, USA

The Space Analog for the Moon & Mars (SAM) is a hermetically sealed and pressurized terrestrial analog site. This hi-fidelity research vessel is located at the University of Arizona Biosphere 2 research campus at the base of Santa Catalina Mountains near Oracle, Arizona, USA. Following two and a half years in construction led by Director of Research and principal designer Kai Staats, in April 2023 SAM joined the list of over a dozen active analog stations that enable human analog missions, field tests to “validate architecture concepts, demonstrate technologies” and “test robotics, vehicles, habitats, communication systems, in situ resource utilization (ISRU) and human performance as it relates to human space exploration”. Supported by an international team of specialists with the University of Arizona, NASA, the National Geographic Society, and commercial partners, the core foci of SAM are scientific research objectives related to human space exploration, long-duration other-world habitation, and sustainability of Earth systems and human quality of life. In 2025, SAM participated in The World's Biggest Analog (WBA), “an international collaboration of researchers, scientists, educators and entrepreneurs working to unite the world’s analogs through a unique and historical mission”.

== Background ==
Kai Staats, Director of Research for SAM at the University of Arizona Biosphere 2, developed the concept of SAM around the 1987 prototype for Biosphere 2, i.e. the Test Module. Design and fund raising was initiated in March 2019 with primary construction conducted from January 2021 through April 2023. Staats and his team of volunteers, staff, and consultants renovated the Test Module and then extended that pressure vessel to include an engineering bay, crew quarters with sleeping accommodations, common area, kitchen, and bath; and fully functional airlock. SAM’s first crewed missions were in April and May 2023.

== Habitat and field environment ==
Designed to accommodate crews of one to four members, and mission durations from six days to several weeks, SAM’s habitat consists of a functional airlock, crew quarters, engineering bay, greenhouse with hydroponics and small grow beds, and a variable volume pressure regulation chamber (a.k.a. “lung”) to maintain a constant pressure. SAM is equipped with environmental control and life-support systems (ECLSS) aided by real-time air quality monitoring using SIMOC Live. (SIMOC is a scalable, interactive model of an off-world community, hosted by the National Geographic Society and founded on published data derived from life-support and closed ecosystem research at NASA and universities world-wide.) Hydroponics food cultivars provide partial off-set for mechanical carbon dioxide scrubbers. Fully functional pressurized suits provide for realistic extravehicular activities (EVAs) in a half acre indoor/outdoor Mars yard.

== Crewed missions ==
With the success of the first two 6-day missions, Inclusion I (April 26 – May 2, 2023) and Inclusion II (May 9–15, 2023), SAM proved to be operational with sustained air quality monitoring and pressure regulation, water reuse, and food recycling systems. Highlights of these missions included inclusivity of one blind member in each crew investigating accessibility; installation of 3D printer; CO_{2} studies; feasibility of vegetarian meals from dehydrated foods; hydroponics and mushroom growth and harvest; and EVAs using pressurized space suits. Linda Leigh (Biosphere 2 member in the first sealed mission 1991-93), Phil Hawes (chief architect for the Biosphere 2), and Bernd Zabel (construction manager for the Biosphere 2 and member of the second sealed mission in 1994) were present for ingress and egress of these first missions.

== Research ==
Current ongoing research being conducted at SAM at Biosphere 2 includes ecosystem modeling for biological life-support systems using SIMOC, the design of a solar-powered swing-bed carbon dioxide scrubber, total water recycling, food cultivar studies, haptics and tool use, and pressure regulation systems. SAM also investigates closed ecological systems (CES) and the transition from physical-chemical to fully-integrated bioregenerative life support systems (BLSS) which will be important to preparing humans for long-duration, other-world habitation.
