= Comparative planetary science =

Similarities and differences between planets

Comparative planetary science or comparative planetology is a branch of space science and planetary science in which different natural processes and systems are studied by their effects and phenomena on and between multiple bodies. The planetary processes in question include geology, hydrology, atmospheric physics, and interactions such as impact cratering, space weathering, and magnetospheric physics in the solar wind, and possibly biology, via astrobiology.

Comparison of multiple bodies assists the researcher, if for no other reason than the Earth is far more accessible than any other body. Those distant bodies may then be evaluated in the context of processes already characterized on Earth. Conversely, other bodies (including extrasolar ones) may provide additional examples, edge cases, and counterexamples to earthbound processes; without a greater context, studying these phenomena in relation to Earth alone may result in low sample sizes and observational biases.

== Background ==
The term "comparative planetology" was coined by George Gamow, who reasoned that to fully understand our own planet, we must study others. Poldervaart focused on the Moon, stating "An adequate picture of this original planet and its development to the present earth is of great significance, is in fact the ultimate goal of geology as the science leading to knowledge and understanding of earth's history."

== Geology, geochemistry, and geophysics ==
All terrestrial planets (and some satellites, such as the Moon) are essentially composed of silicates wrapped around iron cores. The large outer Solar System moons and Pluto have more ice, and less rock and metal, but still undergo analogous processes.

=== Volcanism ===
Volcanism on Earth is largely lava-based. Other terrestrial planets display volcanic features assumed to be lava-based, evaluated in the context of analogues readily studied on Earth. For example, Jupiter's moon Io displays extant volcanism, including lava flows. These flows were initially inferred to be composed mostly of various forms of molten elemental sulfur, based on analysis of imaging done by the Voyager probes. However, Earth-based infrared studies done in the 1980s and 1990s caused the consensus to shift in favor of a primarily silicate-based model, with sulfur playing a secondary role.

Much of the surface of Mars is composed of various basalts considered analogous to Hawaiian basalts, by their spectra and in situ chemical analyses (including Martian meteorites). Mercury and Earth's Moon similarly feature large areas of basalts, formed by ancient volcanic processes. Surfaces in the polar regions show polygonal morphologies, also seen on Earth.

In addition to basalt flows, Venus is home to a large number of pancake dome volcanoes created by highly viscous silica-rich lava flows. These domes lack a known Earth analogue. They do bear some morphological resemblance to terrestrial rhyolite-dacite lava domes, although the pancake domes are much flatter and uniformly round in nature.

Certain regions further out in the Solar System exhibit cryovolcanism, a process not seen anywhere on earth. Cryovolcanism is studied through laboratory experiments, conceptual and numerical modeling, and by cross-comparison to other examples in the field. Examples of bodies with cryovolcanic features include comets, some asteroids and Centaurs, Mars, Europa, Enceladus, Triton, and possibly Titan, Ceres, Pluto, and Eris.

The trace dopants of Europa's ice are currently postulated to contain sulfur. This is being evaluated via a Canadian sulfate spring as an analogue, in preparation for future Europa probes. Small bodies such as comets, some asteroid types, and dust grains, on the other hand, serve as counterexamples. Assumed to have experienced little or no heating, these materials may contain (or be) samples representing the early Solar System, which have since been erased from Earth or any other large body.

Some extrasolar planets are covered entirely in lava oceans, and some are tidally locked planets, whose star-facing hemisphere is entirely lava.

=== Cratering ===
The craters observed on the Moon were once assumed to be volcanic. Earth, by comparison, did not show a similar crater count, nor a high frequency of large meteor events, which would be expected as two nearby bodies should experience similar impact rates. Eventually this volcanism model was overturned, as numerous Earth craters (demonstrated by e. g., shatter cones, shocked quartz and other impactites, and possibly spall) were found, after having been eroded over geologic time. Craters formed by larger and larger ordnance also served as models. The Moon, on the other hand, shows no atmosphere or hydrosphere, and could thus accumulate and preserve impact craters over billions of years despite a low impact rate at any one time. In addition, more searches by more groups with better equipment highlighted the great number of asteroids, presumed to have been even more numerous in earlier Solar System periods.

As on Earth, a low crater count on other bodies indicates young surfaces. This is particularly credible if nearby regions or bodies show heavier cratering. Young surfaces, in turn, indicate atmospheric, tectonic or volcanic, or hydrological processing on large bodies and comets, or dust redistribution or a relatively recent formation on asteroids (i. e., splitting from a parent body).

Examination of the cratering record on multiple bodies, at multiple areas in the Solar System, points to a Late Heavy Bombardment, which in turn gives evidence of the Solar System's early history. However, the Late Heavy Bombardment as currently proposed has some issues and is not completely accepted.

One model for Mercury's exceptionally high density compared to other terrestrial planets is the stripping off of a significant amount of crust and/or mantle from extremely heavy bombardment.

=== Differentiation ===
As a large body, Earth can efficiently retain its internal heat (from its initial formation plus decay of its radioisotopes) over the long timescale of the Solar System. It thus retains a molten core, and has differentiated- dense materials have sunk to the core, while light materials float to form a crust.

Other bodies, by comparison, may or may not have differentiated, based on their formation history, radioisotope content, further energy input via bombardment, distance from the Sun, size, etc. Studying bodies of various sizes and distances from the Sun provides examples and places constraints on the differentiation process. Differentiation itself is evaluated indirectly, by the mineralogy of a body's surface, versus its expected bulk density and mineralogy, or via shape effects due to slight variations in gravity. Differentiation may also be measured directly, by the higher-order terms of a body's gravity field as measured by a flyby or gravitational assist, and in some cases by librations.

Edge cases include Vesta and some of the larger moons, which show differentiation but are assumed to have since fully solidified. The question of whether Earth's Moon has solidified, or retains some molten layers, has not been definitively answered. Additionally, differentiation processes are expected to vary along a continuum. Bodies may be composed of lighter and heavier rocks and metals, a high water ice and volatiles content (with less mechanical strength) in cooler regions of the Solar System, or primarily ices with a low rock/metal content even farther from the Sun. This continuum is thought to record the varying chemistries of the early Solar System, with refractories surviving in warm regions, and volatiles driven outward by the young Sun.

The cores of planets are inaccessible, studied indirectly by seismometry, gravimetry, and in some cases magnetometry. However, iron and stony-iron meteorites are likely fragments from the cores of parent bodies which have partially or completely differentiated, then shattered. These meteorites are thus the only means of directly examining deep-interior materials and their processes.

Gas giant planets represent another form of differentiation, with multiple fluid layers by density. Some distinguish further between true gas giants, and ice giants further from the Sun.

=== Tectonics ===
In turn, a molten core may allow plate tectonics, of which Earth shows major features. Mars, as a smaller body than Earth, shows no current tectonic activity, nor mountain ridges from geologically recent activity. This is assumed to be due to an interior that has cooled faster than the Earth (see geomagnetism below). An edge case may be Venus, which does not appear to have extant tectonics. However, in its history, it likely has had tectonic activity but lost it. It is possible tectonic activity on Venus may still be sufficient to restart after a long era of accumulation.

Io, despite having high volcanism, does not show any tectonic activity, possibly due to sulfur-based magmas with higher temperatures, or simply higher volumetric fluxes. Meanwhile, Vesta's fossae may be considered a form of tectonics, despite that body's small size and cool temperatures.

Europa is a key demonstration of outer-planet tectonics. Its surface shows movement of ice blocks or rafts, strike-slip faults, and possibly diapirs. The question of extant tectonics is far less certain, possibly having been replaced by local cryomagmatism. Ganymede and Triton may contain tectonically or cryovolcanically resurfaced areas, and Miranda's irregular terrains may be tectonic.

Earthquakes are well-studied on Earth, as multiple seismometers or large arrays can be used to derive quake waveforms in multiple dimensions. The Moon is the only other body to successfully receive a seismometer array; "marsquakes" and the Mars interior are based on simple models and Earth-derived assumptions. Venus has received negligible seismometry.

Gas giants may in turn show different forms of heat transfer and mixing. Furthermore, gas giants show different heat effects by size and distance to the Sun. Uranus shows a net negative heat budget to space, but the others (including Neptune, farther out) are net positive.

=== Geomagnetism ===
Two terrestrial planets (Earth and Mercury) display magnetospheres, and thus have molten metal layers. Similarly, all four gas giants have magnetospheres, which indicate layers of conductive fluids. Ganymede also shows a weak magnetosphere, taken as evidence of a subsurface layer of salt water, while the volume around Rhea shows symmetrical effects which may be rings or a magnetic phenomenon. Of these, Earth's magnetosphere is by far the most accessible, including from the surface. It is therefore the most studied, and extraterrestrial magnetospheres are examined in light of prior Earth studies.

Still, differences exist between magnetospheres, pointing to areas needing further research. Jupiter's magnetosphere is stronger than the other gas giants, while Earth's is stronger than Mercury's. Mercury and Uranus have offset magnetospheres, which have no satisfactory explanation yet. Uranus' tipped axis causes its magnetotail to corkscrew behind the planet, with no known analogue. Future Uranian studies may show new magnetospheric phenomena.

Mars shows remnants of an earlier, planetary-scale magnetic field, with stripes as on Earth. This is taken as evidence that the planet had a molten metal core in its prior history, allowing both a magnetosphere and tectonic activity (as on Earth). Both of these have since dissipated. Earth's Moon shows localized magnetic fields, indicating some process other than a large, molten metal core. This may be the source of lunar swirls, not seen on Earth.

=== Geochemistry ===
Apart from their distance to the Sun, different bodies show chemical variations indicating their formation and history. Neptune is denser than Uranus, taken as one piece of evidence that the two may have switched places in the early Solar System. Comets show both high volatile content, and grains containing refractory materials. This also indicates some mixing of materials through the Solar System when those comets formed. Mercury's inventory of materials by volatility is being used to evaluate different models for its formation and/or subsequent modification.

Isotopic abundances indicate processes over the history of the Solar System. To an extent, all bodies formed from the presolar nebula. Various subsequent processes then alter elemental and isotopic ratios. The gas giants in particular have enough gravity to retain primary atmospheres, taken largely from the presolar nebula, as opposed to the later outgassing and reactions of secondary atmospheres. Differences in gas giant atmospheres compared to solar abundances then indicate some process in that planet's history. Meanwhile, gases at small planets such as Venus and Mars have isotopic differences indicating atmospheric escape processes.{argon isotope ratio planet meteorite}{neon isotope ratio meteorite}

The various modifications of surface minerals, or space weathering, is used to evaluate meteorite and asteroid types and ages. Rocks and metals shielded by atmospheres (particularly thick ones), or other minerals, experience less weathering and fewer implantation chemistries and cosmic ray tracks. Asteroids are currently graded by their spectra, indicating surface properties and mineralogies. Some asteroids appear to have less space weathering, by various processes including a relatively recent formation date or a "freshening" event. As Earth's minerals are well shielded, space weathering is studied via extraterrestrial bodies, and preferably multiple examples.

Kuiper Belt Objects display very weathered or in some cases very fresh surfaces. As the long distances result in low spatial and spectral resolutions, KBO surface chemistries are currently evaluated via analogous moons and asteroids closer to Earth.

== Aeronomy and atmospheric physics ==
Earth's atmosphere is far thicker than that of Mars, while far thinner than Venus'. In turn, the envelopes of gas giants are a different class entirely, and show their own gradations. Meanwhile, smaller bodies show tenuous atmospheres ("surface-bound exospheres"), with the exception of Titan and arguably Triton. Comets vary between negligible atmospheres in the outer Solar System, and active comas millions of miles across at perihelion. Exoplanets may in turn possess atmospheric properties known and unknown in the Milky Way Galaxy.

=== Aeronomy ===
Atmospheric escape is largely a thermal process. The atmosphere a body can retain therefore varies from the warmer inner Solar System, to the cooler outer regions. Different bodies in different Solar System regions provide analogous or contrasting examples. The atmosphere of Titan is considered analogous to an early, colder Earth; the atmosphere of Pluto is considered analogous to an enormous comet.

The presence or absence of a magnetic field affects an upper atmosphere, and in turn the overall atmosphere. Impacts of solar wind particles create chemical reactions and ionic species, which may in turn affect magnetospheric phenomena. Earth serves as a counterexample to Venus and Mars, which have no planetary magnetospheres, and to Mercury, with a magnetosphere but negligible atmosphere.

Jupiter's moon Io creates sulfur emissions, and a feature of sulfur and some sodium around that planet. Similarly, Earth's Moon has trace sodium emissions, and a far weaker tail. Mercury also has a trace sodium atmosphere.

Jupiter itself is assumed to have some characteristics of extrasolar "super Jupiters" and brown dwarves.

=== Seasons ===
Uranus, tipped on its side, is postulated to have seasonal effects far stronger than on Earth. Similarly, Mars is postulated to have varied its axial tilt over eons, and to a far greater extent than on Earth. This is hypothesized to have dramatically altered not only seasons but climates on Mars, for which some evidence has been observed. Venus has negligible tilt, eliminating seasons, and a slow, retrograde rotation, causing different diurnal effects than on Earth and Mars.

=== Clouds and haze layers ===
From Earth, a planetwide cloud layer is the dominant feature of Venus in the visible spectrum; this is also true of Titan. Venus' cloud layer is composed of sulfur dioxide particles, while Titan's is a mixture of organics.

The gas giant planets display clouds or belts of various compositions, including ammonia and methane.

=== Circulation and winds ===
Venus and Titan, and to a lesser extent Earth, are super-rotators: the atmosphere turns about the planet faster than the surface beneath. While these atmospheres share physical processes, they exhibit diverse characteristics.

Hadley cells, first postulated and confirmed on Earth, are seen in different forms in other atmospheres. Earth has Hadley cells north and south of its equator, leading to additional cells by latitude. Mars' Hadley circulation is offset from its equator. Titan, a far smaller body, likely has one enormous cell, flipping polarity from northerly to southerly with its seasons.

The bands of Jupiter are thought to be numerous Hadley-like cells by latitude.

=== Storms and cyclonic activity ===
The large storms seen on the gas giants are considered analogous to Earth cyclones. However, this is an imperfect metaphor as expected, due to the large differences in sizes, temperature, and composition between Earth and the gas giants, and even between gas giants.

Polar vortices were observed on Venus and Saturn. In turn, Earth's thinner atmosphere shows weaker polar vorticity and effects.

=== Lightning and aurorae ===
Both lightning and aurorae have been observed on other bodies after extensive study at Earth. Lightning has been detected on Venus, and may be a sign of active volcanism on that planet, as volcanic lightning is known on Earth. Aurorae have been observed on Jupiter and its moon Ganymede.

=== Comparative climatology ===
An understanding of the evolutionary histories and current states of the Venus and Mars climates is directly relevant for studies of the past, present and future climates of Earth.

== Hydrology ==
A growing number of bodies display relict or current hydrological modification. Earth, the "ocean planet," is the prime example. Other bodies display lesser modifications, indicating their similarities and differences. This may be defined to include fluids other than water, such as light hydrocarbons on Titan, or possibly supercritical carbon dioxide on Mars, which do not persist in Earth conditions. Ancient lava flows in turn may be considered a form of hydrological modification, which may be confounded with other fluids. Io currently has lava calderas and lakes. Fluid modification may have occurred on bodies as small as Vesta; hydration in general has been observed.

If fluids include groundwater and vapor, the list of bodies with hydrological modification includes Earth, Mars, and Enceladus, to a lesser extent comets and some asteroids, likely Europa and Triton, and possibly Ceres, Titan, and Pluto. Venus may have had hydrology in its early history, which would since have been erased.

Fluid modification and mineral deposition on Mars, as observed by the MER and MSL rovers, is studied in light of Earth features and minerals. Minerals observed from orbiters and landers indicates formation in aqueous conditions; morphologies indicate fluid action and deposition.

Extant Mars hydrology includes brief, seasonal flows on slopes; however, most Martian water is frozen into its polar caps and subsurface, as indicated by ground penetrating radars and pedestal craters. Antifreeze mixtures such as salts, peroxides, and perchlorates may allow fluid flow at Martian temperatures.

Analogues of Mars landforms on Earth include Siberian and Hawaiian valleys, Greenland slopes, the Columbian Plateau, and various playas. Analogues for human expeditions (e.g. geology and hydrology fieldwork) include Devon Island, Canada, Antarctica, Utah, the Euro-Mars project, and Arkaroola, South Australia.

The Moon, on the other hand, is a natural laboratory for regolith processes and weathering on anhydrous airless bodies- modification and alteration by meteoroid and micrometeoroid impacts, the implantation of solar and interstellar charged particles, radiation damage, spallation, exposure to ultraviolet radiation, and so on. Knowledge of the processes that create and modify the lunar regolith is essential to understanding the compositional and structural attributes of other airless planet and asteroid regoliths.

Other possibilities include extrasolar planets completely covered by oceans, which would lack some Earthly processes.

== Dynamics ==
Earth, alone among terrestrial planets, possesses a large moon. This is thought to confer stability to Earth's axial tilt, and thus seasons and climates. The closest analogue is the Pluto-Charon system, though its axial tilt is completely different. Both the Moon and Charon are hypothesized to have formed via giant impacts.

Giant impacts are hypothesized to account for both the tilt of Uranus, and the retrograde rotation of Venus. Giant impacts are also candidates for the Mars ocean hypothesis, and the high density of Mercury.

Most giant planets (except Neptune) have retinues of moons, rings, ring shepherds, and moon Trojans analogous to mini-solar systems. These systems are postulated to have accreted from analogous gas clouds, and possibly with analogous migrations during their formation periods. The Cassini mission was defended on the grounds that Saturn system dynamics would contribute to studies of Solar System dynamics and formation.

Studies of ring systems inform us of many-body dynamics. This is applicable to the asteroid and Kuiper Belts, and the early Solar System, which had more objects, dust, and gas. It is relevant to the magnetospherics of those bodies. It is also relevant to the dynamics of the Milky Way galaxy and others. In turn, though the Saturnian system is readily studied (by Cassini, ground telescopes, and space telescopes), the simpler and lower mass ring systems of the other giants makes their explanations somewhat easier to fathom. The Jupiter ring system is perhaps more completely understood at present than any of the other three.

Asteroid families and gaps indicate their local dynamics. They are in turn indicative of the Kuiper Belt, and its hypothesized Kuiper cliff. The Hildas and Jupiter Trojans are then relevant to the Neptune Trojans and Plutinos, Twotinos, etc.

Neptune's relative lack of a moon system suggests its formation and dynamics. The migration of Triton explains the ejection or destruction of competing moons, analogous to Hot Jupiters (also in sparse systems), and the Grand Tack hypothesis of Jupiter itself, on a smaller scale.

The planets are considered to have formed by accretion of larger and larger particles, into asteroids and planetesimals, and into today's bodies. Vesta and Ceres are hypothesized to be the only surviving examples of planetesimals, and thus samples of the formative period of the Solar System.

Transits of Mercury and Venus have been observed as analogues of extrasolar transits. As Mercury and Venus transits are far closer and thus appear "deeper," they can be studied in far finer detail. Similarly, analogues to the Solar System's asteroid and Kuiper belts have been observed around other star systems, though in far less detail.

== Astrobiology ==
Earth is the only body known to contain life; this results in geologic and atmospheric life signatures apart from the organisms themselves. Methane observed on Mars has been postulated but cannot be definitively ascribed as a biosignature. Multiple processes of non-biological methane generation are seen on Earth as well.

The detection of biomarkers or biosignatures on other worlds is an active area of research. Although oxygen and/or ozone are generally considered strong signs of life, these too have alternate, non-biological explanations.

The Galileo mission, while performing a gravity assist flyby of Earth, treated the planet as an extraterrestrial one, in a test of life detection techniques. Conversely, the Deep Impact mission's High Resolution Imager, intended for examining comets starting from great distances, could be repurposed for exoplanet observations in its EPOXI extended mission.

Conversely, detection of life entails identification of those processes favoring or preventing life. This occurs primarily via study of Earth life and Earth processes, though this is in effect a sample size of one. Care must be taken to avoid observation and selection biases. Astrobiologists consider alternative chemistries for life, and study on Earth extremophile organisms that expand the potential definitions of habitable worlds.

== See also ==
- Europlanet
- List of Mars analogs
- Lunar Crater National Natural Landmark
- Terrestrial Analogue Sites

== Bibliography ==
- Murray, B. Earthlike Planets (1981) W. H. Freeman and Company ISBN 0-7167-1148-6
- Consolmagno, G.; Schaefer, M. (1994). Worlds Apart: A Textbook In Planetary Sciences. Prentice Hall. ISBN 978-0-13-964131-2.
- Cattermole, P. (1995). Earth And Other Planets. Oxford University Press. ISBN 978-0-19-521138-2.
- Petersen, C.; Beatty, K.; Chaikin, A. (1999). The New Solar System, 4th Edition. Cambridge University Press. ISBN 978-0-521-64587-4.
- K. Condie (2005). Earth as an Evolving Planetary System. Elsevier. ISBN 978-0-12-088392-9.
- C. Cockell (2007). Space on Earth. Macmillan. ISBN 978-0-230-00752-9.
- J. Bennett; et al. (2012). The Cosmic Perspective, 7th Edition. Addison-Wesley. ISBN 978-0-321-84106-3.
