= Spotted Lake =

Alkali lake in Osoyoos, British Columbia, Canada

- Lake Kliluk (Nsyilxcən: Kłlil’xᵂ)
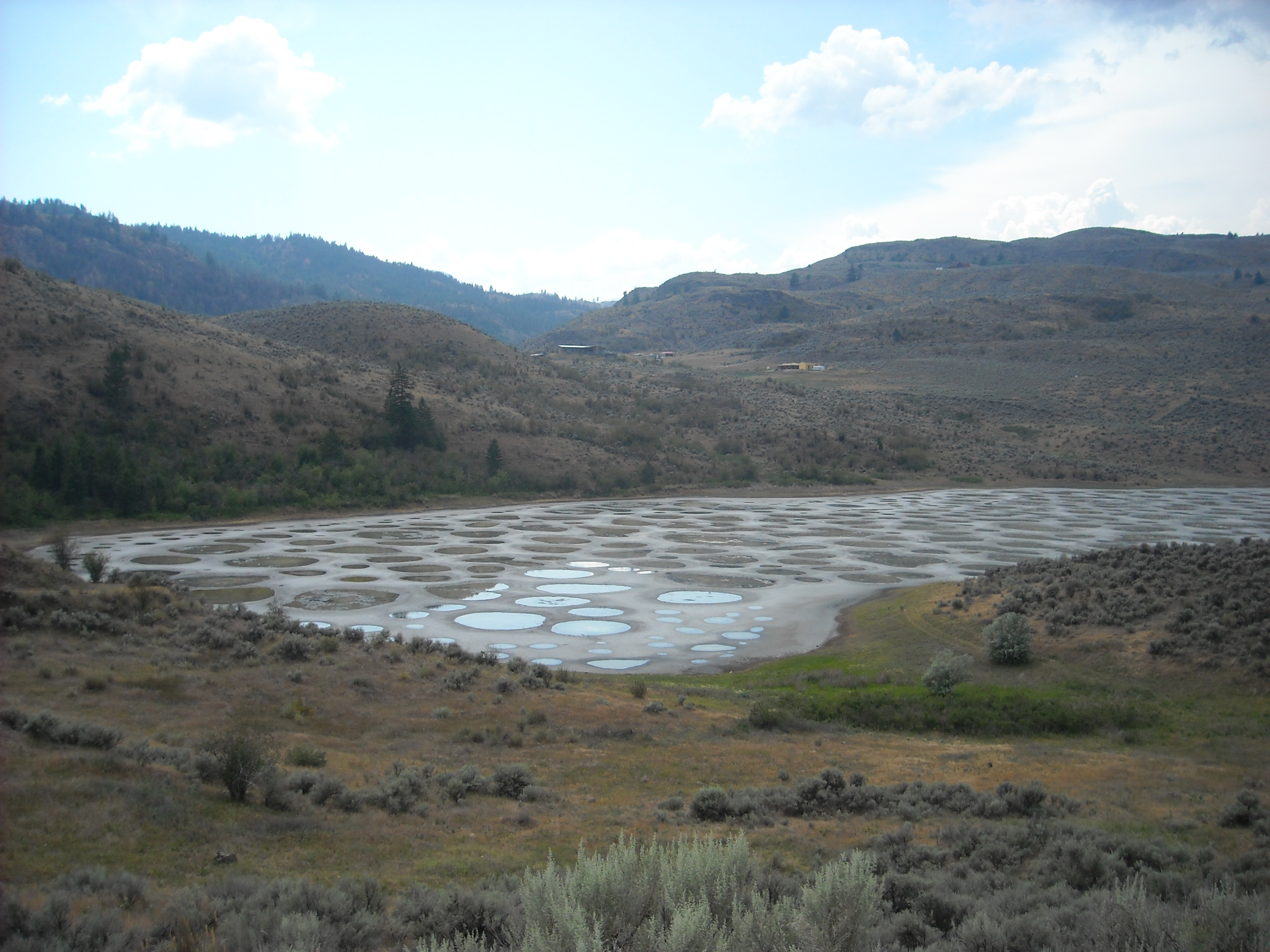

- Location within British Columbia
- Location: Northwest of Osoyoos, British Columbia
- Coordinates: 49.07806°N 119.56694°W
- Type: Saline, alkali, endorheic basin
- Primary outflows: Terminal (evaporation)
- Basin countries: Canada
- Max. length: 0.7 km (0.43 mi)
- Max. width: 0.25 km (0.16 mi)
- Shore length^{1}: 1.7 km (1.1 mi)
- Surface elevation: 573 m (1,880 ft)
- ^{1} Shore length is not a well-defined measure.

Spotted Lake — known as Lake Khiluk (Nsyilxcən: Kłlil’xᵂ) in the Nsyilxcən language — is a saline endorheic alkali lake located northwest of Osoyoos in the eastern Similkameen Valley of British Columbia, Canada, accessed via Highway 3.

== Mineral and salt concentration ==
Spotted Lake is richly concentrated with various minerals. It contains dense deposits of magnesium sulfate, calcium and sodium sulphates. It also contains high concentrations of eight other minerals and lower amounts of silver and titanium.

Most of the water in the lake evaporates over the summer, revealing colourful mineral deposits. Large "spots" on the lake appear and are coloured according to the mineral composition and seasonal amount of precipitation. Magnesium sulfate, which crystallizes in the summer, is a major contributor to spot colour. In the summer, remaining minerals in the lake harden to form natural "walkways" around and between the spots.

== Naming and history ==
Originally named in the Nsyilxcən language of the Syilx Okanagan Nation of the Okanagan Valley as Kłlil’xᵂ, Spotted Lake was for centuries, and still remains, revered as a sacred site thought to provide therapeutic waters. During World War I, the minerals of Spotted Lake were used in manufacturing ammunition.

Later, the area came under the control of the Ernest Smith Family for a term of about 40 years. In 1979, Smith attempted to create interest in a spa at the lake. The First Nations responded with an effort to buy the lake, then in October 2001, struck a deal by purchasing 22 hectares (54 acres) of land for a total of $720,000, and contributed about 20% of the cost. The Indian Affairs Department paid the remainder.

== Spotted Lake today ==
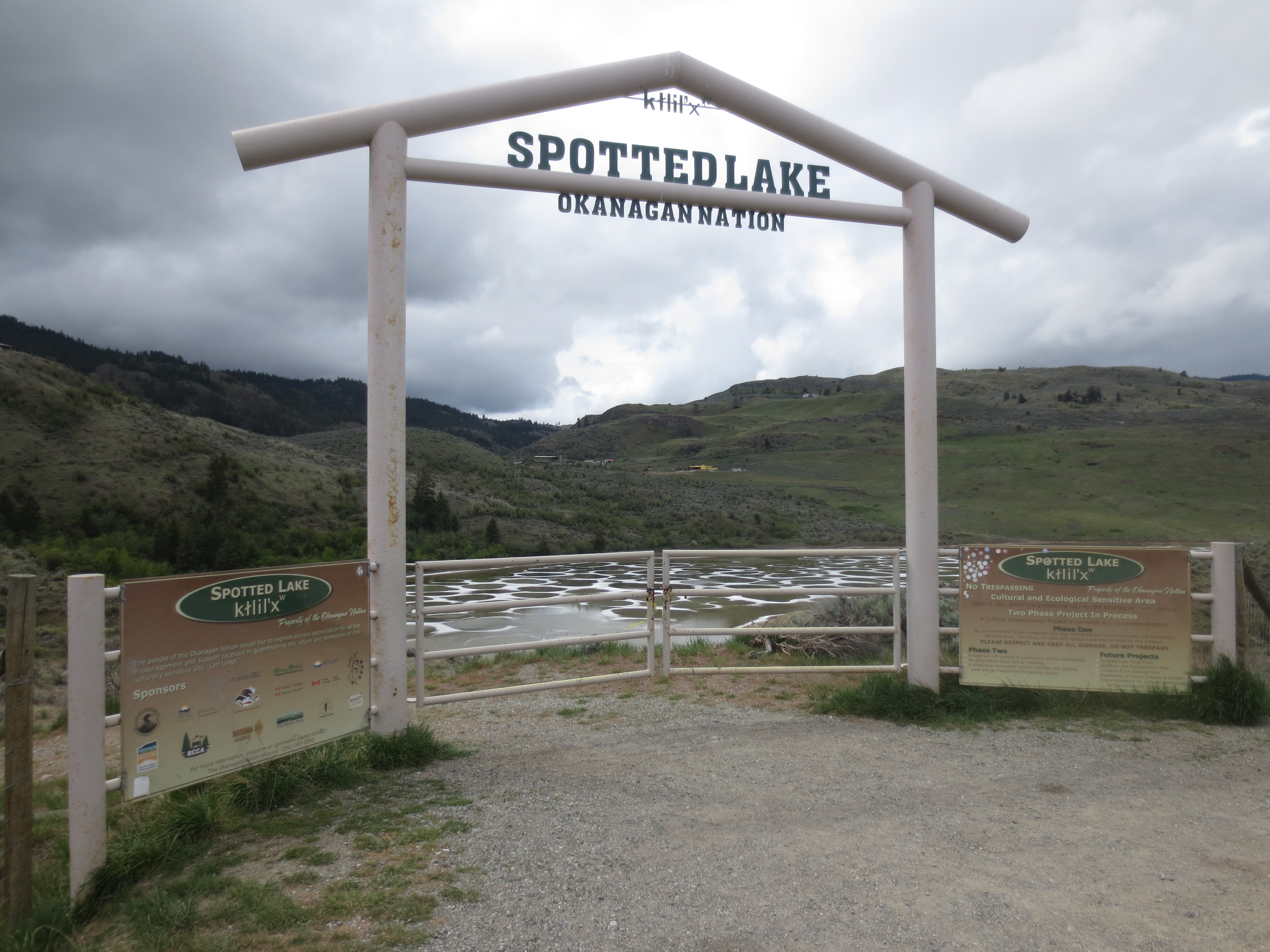
Gateway to Spotted Lake

Today, there is a roadside sign telling visitors that the lake is a cultural and ecologically sensitive area, and a traditional medicine lake for the Okanagan Syilx people. The lake can be viewed from the fence that has been erected for protection from the liabilities of public access.

== See also ==
- List of lakes of British Columbia
