= Yellow Dog Linux =

Linux distribution

- Developer: Fixstars Solutions
- OS family: Linux (Unix-like)
- Working state: Discontinued
- Source model: Open source
- Final release: 7.0 / August 6, 2012; 14 years ago
- Supported platforms: POWER7, Cell
- Kernel type: Monolithic (Linux kernel)
- Default user interface: Enlightenment
- License: GNU GPL, LGPL, others
- Official website: web.archive.org/web/20220214173907/us.fixstars.com/products/ydl/what/overview/

Yellow Dog Linux (YDL) is a discontinued free and open-source operating system for high-performance computing on multi-core processor computer architectures, focusing on GPU systems and computers using the POWER7 processor. The original developer was Terra Soft Solutions, which was acquired by Fixstars in October 2008. Yellow Dog Linux was first released in the spring of 1999 for Apple Macintosh PowerPC-based computers. The last version, Yellow Dog Linux 7, was released on 6 August 2012. Yellow Dog Linux lent its name to the popular YUM Linux software updater, derived from YDL's YUP (Yellowdog UPdater) and thus called Yellowdog Updater, Modified.

== Features ==
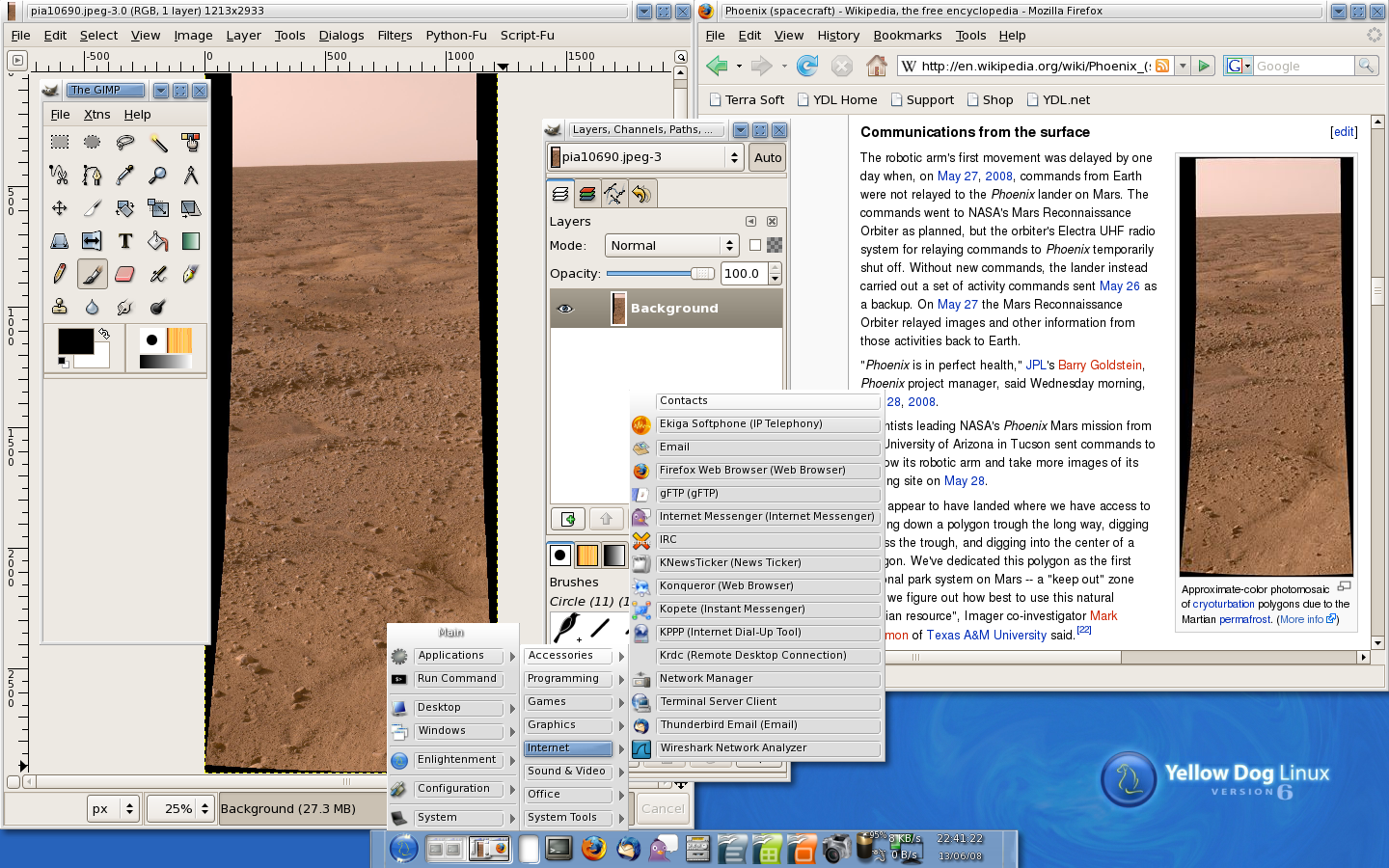
Screenshot of Yellow Dog Linux Version 6.0 'Pyxis' depicting Enlightenment, the default window manager

Yellow Dog Linux is based on Red Hat Enterprise Linux/CentOS and relies on the RPM Package Manager. Its software includes applications such as Ekiga (a voice-over-IP and videoconferencing application), GIMP (a raster graphics editor), Gnash (a free Adobe Flash player), gThumb (an image viewer), the Mozilla Firefox Web browser, the Mozilla Thunderbird e-mail and news client, the OpenOffice.org productivity suite, Pidgin (an instant messaging and IRC client), the Rhythmbox music player, and the KDE Noatun and Totem media players.

Starting with YDL version 5.0 'Phoenix', Enlightenment is the Yellow Dog Linux default desktop environment, although GNOME and KDE are also included.

Like other Linux distributions, Yellow Dog Linux supports software development with GCC (compiled with support for C, C++, Java, and Fortran), the GNU C Library, GDB, GLib, the GTK+ toolkit, Python, the Qt toolkit, Ruby and Tcl. Standard text editors such as Vim and Emacs are complemented with IDEs such as Eclipse and KDevelop, as well as by graphical debuggers such as KDbg. Standard document preparation tools such as TeX and LaTeX are also included.

Yellow Dog Linux includes software for running a Web server (such as Apache/httpd, Perl, and PHP), database server (such as MySQL and PostgreSQL), and network server (NFS and Webmin). Additional software is also included for running an enterprise server or a compute server or cluster, although two separate products from Terra Soft Solutions, called Yellow Dog Enterprise Linux (for enterprise servers) and Y-HPC (for compute servers/clusters), were specifically targeted toward those applications.

Although several other Linux distributions support the Power ISA, Yellow Dog Linux was distinguished for its focus on supporting the Apple Macintosh platform before the Mac transition to Intel processors. Before this transition, Terra Soft Solutions held the unique distinction of being the only company licensed by Apple to resell Apple computers with Linux pre-installed (or for that matter, with any operating system other than Mac OS X). Full support for AirPort (Apple's implementation of the IEEE 802.11b-1999 wireless networking standard), and partial support for AirPort Extreme, are also built into Yellow Dog Linux, as are support for Bluetooth and support for accessing the Internet over cellular phones.

Following the Mac transition to Intel processors, Yellow Dog Linux retargeted Fedora Core 5.0 and later to support the Sony PlayStation 3 and IBM pSeries platforms extensively, while retaining its longstanding support for PowerPC-based Apple hardware.

== Distribution ==
Yellow Dog Linux was sold by Terra Soft Solutions (later Fixstars), who also marketed PlayStation 3 consoles, IBM workstations, and servers with Yellow Dog Linux pre-installed. As is the case with most other Linux distribution vendors, a portion of the revenue from the sale of those boxed distributions went toward development of the operating system and applications, which are made available as source code under various free and open-source licenses.

== Notable implementations ==
Gaurav Khanna, a professor in the Physics Department at the University of Massachusetts, Dartmouth, built a message-passing based cluster using YDL and 16 PlayStation 3s. This cluster was the first such to generate published scientific results. Dubbed the "PS3 Gravity Grid", it performs astrophysical simulations of large supermassive black holes capturing smaller compact objects. Khanna claimed that the cluster's performance exceeds that of a 100+ Intel Xeon core based traditional Linux cluster on his simulations. The PS3 Gravity Grid received media coverage between 2007 and 2010.

== Release history ==
Version	Name	Release date	Linux Kernel version	Notes
1.1	?	8 March 1999	2.2.15	
1.2	?	4 March 2000	2.2.19	
2.0	Pomona	17 May 2001	2.4.10	
2.1	Fuji	17 October 2001	2.4.18	
2.2	Rome	22 March 2002	2.4.19	
2.3	Dayton	23 June 2002	2.4.20	
3.0	Sirius	19 March 2003	2.4.22	
3.0.1	"	17 September 2003	2.4.22	Fixes issue with RPMs in ver. 3.0
4.0	Orion	29 September 2004	?	
4.1	Sagitta	2 February 2006	2.6.15-rc5	
5.0	Phoenix	27 November 2006	2.6.16	Support for PlayStation 3 (Cell)
5.0.1	"	27 March 2007	2.6.17	
5.0.2	"	14 June 2007	2.6.22-rc4	Support for IBM pSeries
6.0	Pyxis	5 February 2008	2.6.23	
6.1	?	19 November 2008	2.6.27	
6.1	Pyxis	1 February 2009	2.6.28	
6.2	Pyxis	29 June 2009	2.6.29	ydl.oregonstate.edu/iso/RELEASE-NOTES
6.2.1 Enterprise for CUDA	Pyxis	2 March 2010	2.6.29	web.archive.org/web/20100306172311/https://www.fixstars.com/en/company/press/20100302.html
6.3 Enterprise for CUDA	?	14 February 2011	?	
7.0	?	6 August 2012	2.6.32	
