= Martina Dimoska =

Balkan analog astronaut

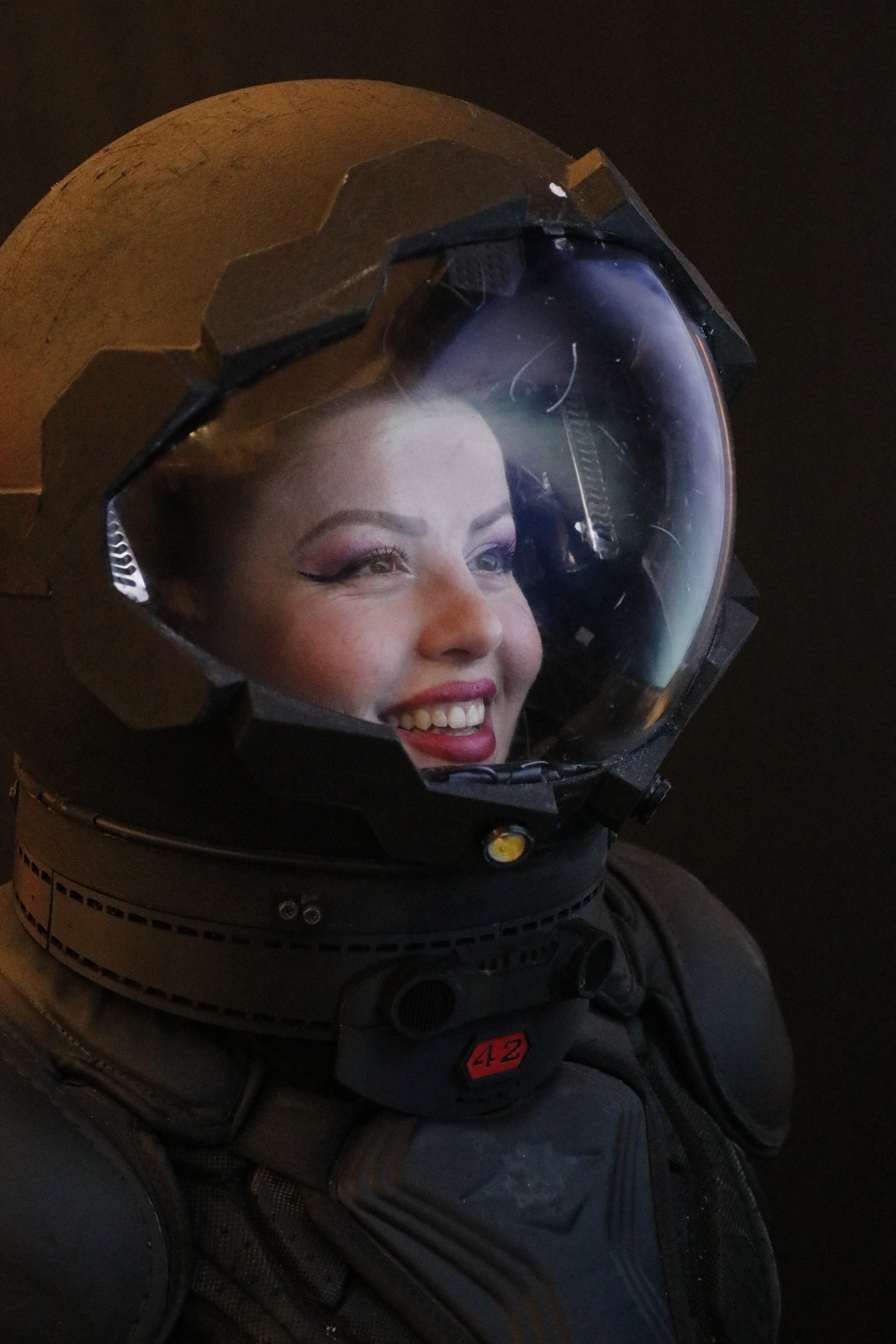
- Dimoska in 2025
- Born: Kičevo, Macedonia
- Education: MSc in Space Studies, International Space University, 2022; Commercial Space Studies, Florida Institute of Technology, 2021; BSc in Material Engineering and Nanotechnology, UKIM, 2019; Aerospace Engineering, Kent State University, 2016
- Occupation: Analog Astronaut Space sector professional
- Space career
- Missions: TERRA NOVA; SELENE; APICES; UND ILMAH 14

Martina Dimoska is a Macedonian analog astronaut, and space sector professional. She has participated in missions at the University of North Dakota Inflatable Lunar/Mars Analog Habitat, LunAres Research Station in Poland, and the APICES mission in Spain. These missions simulate aspects of space exploration in terrestrial environments.

== Early life and education ==
Dimoska was born in 1994 in Kičevo, Macedonia.

She earned a Bachelor of Science in Materials Engineering and Nanotechnology from the Faculty of Technology and Metallurgy at the Ss. Cyril and Methodius University in Skopje (2014–2019). In 2021, she completed the Commercial Space Programs graduate certificate at the Florida Institute of Technology under a scholarship from the Aldrin Family Foundation. As a recipient of a U.S. Department of State scholarship, she studied aerospace engineering at Kent State University in Ohio through the Global UGRAD exchange program. She pursued the Masters of Space Studies at the International Space University in France in 2022 with Final Individual Project about 3D Solar Printer Improvements.

== Career ==
=== Analog astronaut missions ===
Dimoska commanded the SELENE and TERRA NOVA analog missions at LunAres Research Station in Poland. TERRA NOVA was a mirror mission to the Axiom-4 associated with the AstroMentalHealth project, which compared data from an analog mission with data from the International Space Station. Dimoska serve the role of Commander, mirroring Astronaut Peggy.

She participated in the University of North Dakota’s 14th mission at the NASA-funded Inflatable Lunar/Mars Analog Habitat (ILMAH), where the crew conducted research and operational testing related to human spaceflight. The mission included extravehicular activity suit testing, exercise studies developed in partnership with the Canadian Space Agency, NASA, and Simon Fraser University, as well as experiments involving drone operations and plant module research.

In June 2023, Dimoska participated in the APICES (Astroland Project Inside Caves for Earth-based Space Exploration) analog astronaut mission in Spain, organized by ICEE Space in collaboration with Astroland Interplanetary Agency. The mission focused on simulating lunar and Martian environments in support of future human space exploration and research aligned with ESA’s Terrae Novae 2030+ strategy. She served as Crew Engineer and Outreach Lead alongside an international crew led by Aleš Svoboda. The mission studied crew dynamics, robotics, augmented reality systems, and habitat technologies for future lunar and Martian missions.

Some media outlets have described Dimoska as the first female Balkan analog astronaut.

=== Human spaceflight and systems engineering work ===
Dimoska works through Leidos in a role supporting NASA Johnson Space Center as a Program Human Systems Discipline Integrator. The role is associated with Human Health and Performance and the Extravehicular Activity and Human Surface Mobility Program, with work connected to human systems considerations for Moon-to-Mars exploration systems, including xEVA spacesuits, Lunar Terrain Vehicles, pressurized rovers, moon base and lunar surface operations.

=== NASA Space Apps Challenge ===
Dimoska has been involved with the NASA Space Apps Challenge, including organizing events associated with NASA Ames Research Center and NASA Glenn Research Center. In 2024, she received the Best of Tech Rising Star award from the Greater Cleveland Partnership for her work as a local organizer of the event in Cleveland. She also helped establish a Space Apps Challenge hub in Strumica, North Macedonia.

== Recognition ==
She was recognized as an International Astronautical Federation Emerging Space Leader in 2022 and selected for the American Institute of Aeronautics and Astronautics ASCEND Diverse Dozen cohort in 2024.

In 2022, Dimoska received the “Woman with the Greatest Achievements in Science and Technology” award at the Macedonian “Woman of the Year” awards.

Dimoska contributed a science essay to the 2023 anthology Life Beyond Us and was featured in the 2024 book Spacegirl II: 21 Women Write about Their Careers on Earth in the Space Industry.

In 2024, Dimoska was recognized among the Bloomberg Adria Top 50 most influential people in the Adria region by Bloomberg Adria. She was listed in the science category for her contributions to space exploration, research, and international space initiatives.

Dimoska was featured in the 2024 book Se Vikam Hrabrost (“My Name is Courage”), a collection of 50 inspirational stories about notable Macedonian women published by Ars Lamina. The book highlights women recognized for their achievements, perseverance, and contributions to society, science, culture, and public life.

In 2026, Dimoska was awarded the Future Technologies Pioneer distinction at the first Women in Tech® Macedonia Awards, a national technology recognition program organized in cooperation with the Ministry of Digital Transformation and held under the patronage of President Gordana Siljanovska-Davkova.

Dimoska became a member of The Explorers Club in 2026.

In October 2026, Dimoska was named SGAC Global Rising Star.

Wired magazine featured Dimoska in an October 2026 piece regarding borderline notability for a Wikipedia article.

In 2026, the United Macedonian Diaspora names Dimoska to its 40 Under 40 cohort.
