= List of Mars analogs =

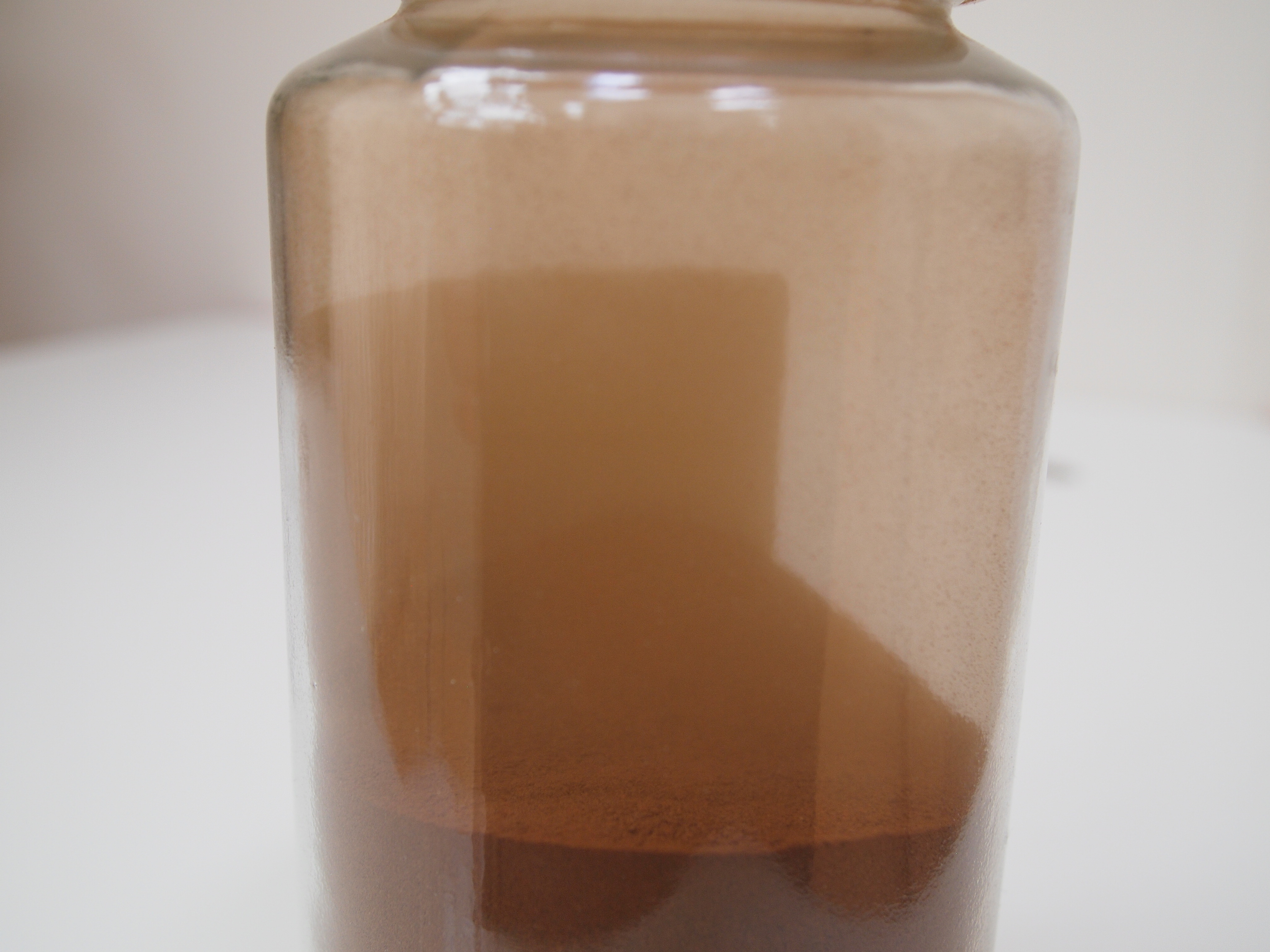
Mars regolith simulant in a jar

This is list of Mars analogs, which simulate aspects of the conditions human beings could experience during a future mission to Mars, or different aspects of Mars such as its materials or conditions. This is often used for testing aspects of spacecraft missions to that planet. For example, Mars regolith has been attempted to be replicated by Mars regolith simulant.

== Crew analog experiments ==
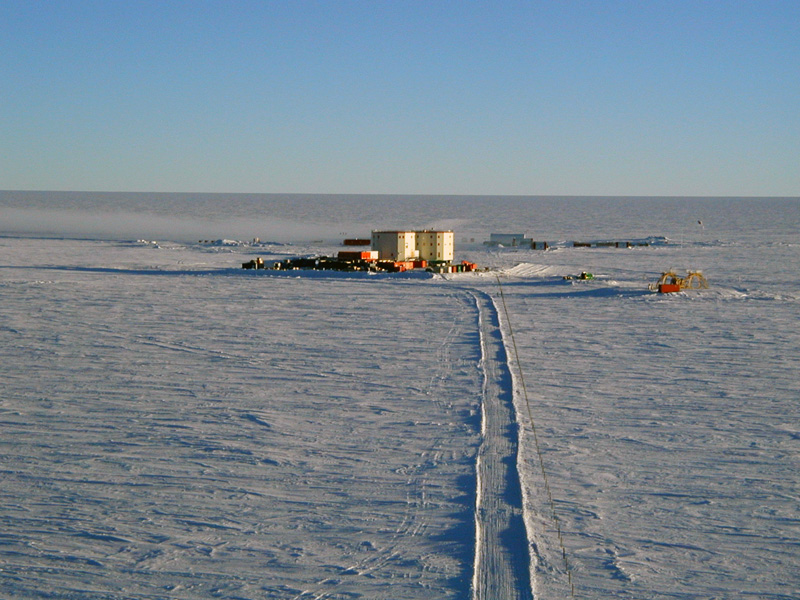
Concordia Research Station at Dome Charlie. Concordia station is a Franco-Italia effort that replicates certain aspects of the human Mars mission and supports the ESA Aurora program.

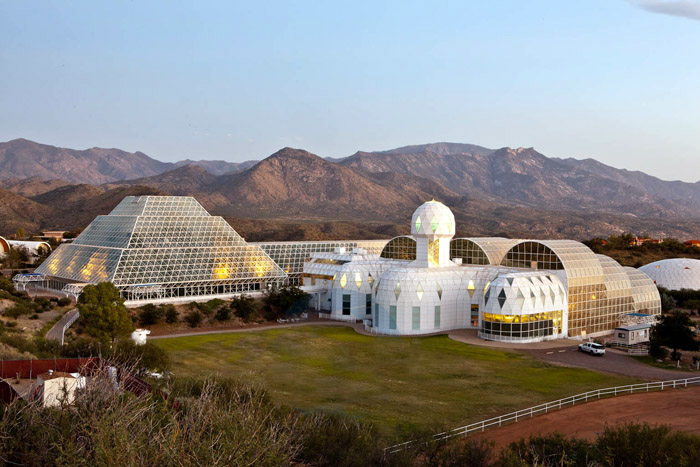
Biosphere 2 in Arizona

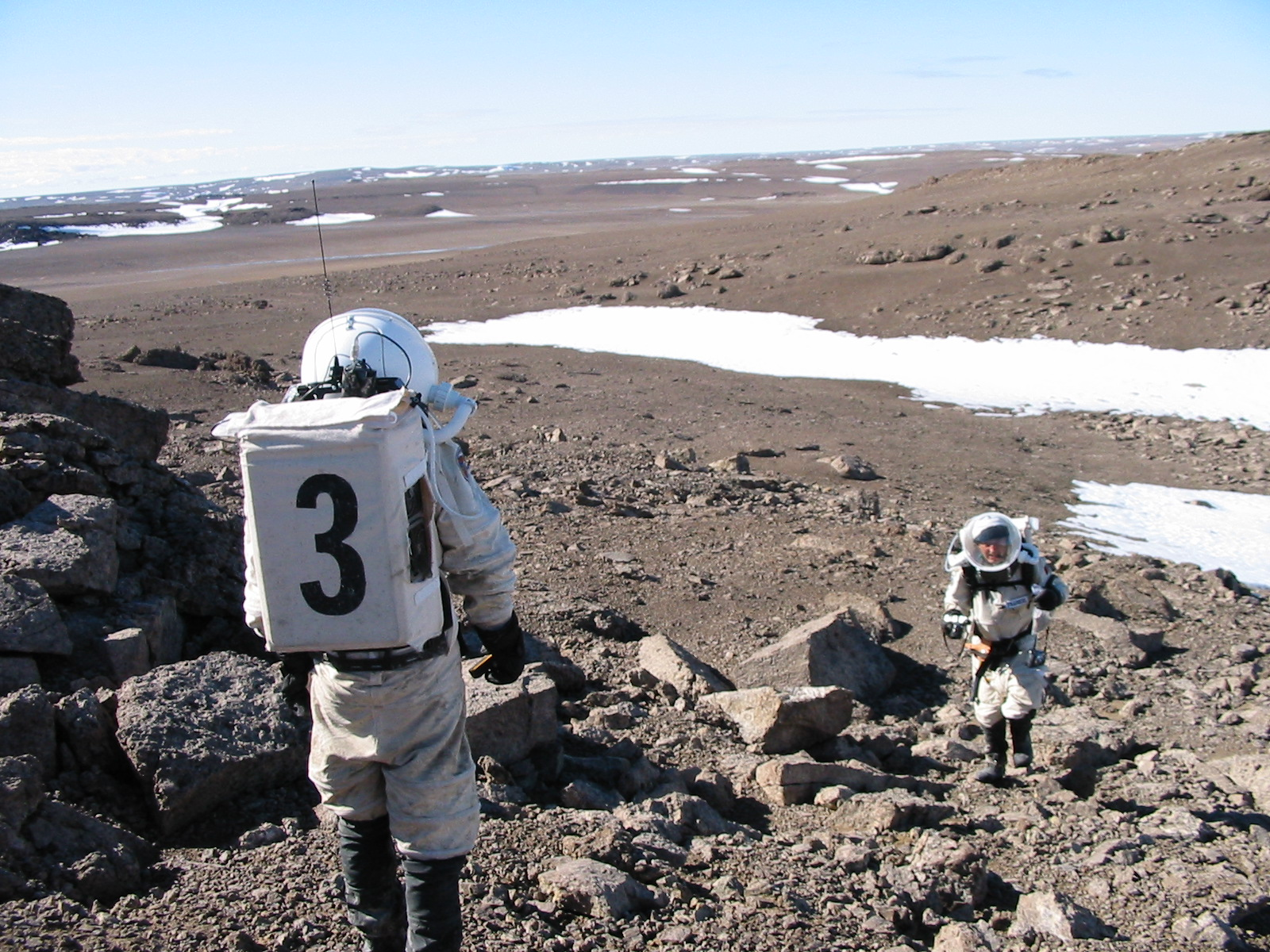
Crew for a Mars research mission practice techniques on Devon Island, in the Canadian arctic

Some examples of analog tests with people include NASA conducting a 120-day study in Hawaii to test a space food diet (HI-SEAS), and equipment tests inside Austrian mountain caves in 2012. A future Mars base has been compared to the Amundsen–Scott South Pole Station in Antarctica, because relatively small groups must survive in extreme conditions there.

Mars analogs are sometimes chosen for their location, for example, Devon Island is at 75°N latitude which provides solar radiance similar to the Martian Equator. Similarly, high altitudes can provide an equivalent to the low pressure of the Mars atmosphere.

Among these are:

- Mars-500, simulated a 520-day mission in Moscow.
- Mars Analogue Research Station Program, simulated Mars habitats
- Flashline Mars Arctic Research Station
- Mars Desert Research Station
- European Mars Analog Research Station
- Australia Mars Analog Research Station
- Arctic Mars Analog Svalbard Expedition, annual expeditions to remote sites
- Concordia Station, multi-purpose Antarctic base
- HI-SEAS, crewed tests in Hawaiian mountains.
- NEEMO, underwater base,
- D-MARS, Israeli mission,
- LunAres Research Station, European habitat in Poland.
- Solar54, Argentina Mars Analog Base project
- Astroland Agency, Spanish Mars Analog Habitat
- SAM Mars Analog, a sealed and pressurized analog at the Biosphere 2 site in Arizona.
- Mars Dune Alpha, a 3D printed Mars habitat created by NASA at the Johnson Space Center in Houston, Texas.

== Pressure ==
| Atmospheric pressure comparison | Pressure | | Reference |
| Atmospheric pressure comparison | kilopascal | psi | Reference |
|---|---|---|---|
| Olympus Mons summit | 0.03 | 0.0044 | – |
| Mars average | 0.6 | 0.087 | – |
| Hellas Planitia bottom | 1.16 | 0.168 | – |
| Armstrong limit | 6.25 | 0.906 | – |
| Mount Everest summit | 33.7 | 4.89 | |
| Earth sea level | 101.3 | 14.69 | – |

At about 28 miles (45 km, 150 thousand feet), Earth altitude the pressure starts to be equivalent to Mars surface pressure. However, the major component of Mars air, CO_{2} gas, is denser than Earth air for a given pressure. Perhaps more significantly there is no land at this altitude on earth. The highest point on earth is the summit of Mount Everest at about 5.5 miles (8.8 km, 29 thousand feet), where the pressure is about fifty times greater than on the surface of Mars. The correct atmospheric pressure can be created by a vacuum chamber. NASA's Space Power Facility was used to test the airbag landing systems for the Mars Pathfinder and the Mars Exploration Rovers, Spirit and Opportunity, under simulated Mars atmospheric conditions.

== Gravity ==
The gravity of Mars is about 38% of Earth's gravity at the surface, about 3.7 metres per second^{2}. This can be simulated for short time by an aircraft following a flight profile that causes this type of acceleration. This technique (using a variation on free-fall) has allowed the gait of people in Mars gravity to be studied.

== 20th century studies ==
The Russians conducted the BIOS-3 study in the 1960s and 1970s, which had 315 cubic metres of space. A later confinement study was Mars 500.

== See also ==
- Mars analog habitat
- Category:Human analog missions
- Research stations in Antarctica
- Space station
- Timeline of longest spaceflights
- Martian meteorite
- Mars habitat
