= Mars analog habitat =

Research simulating the environment on Mars

A Mars analog habitat is one of several historical, existing or proposed research stations designed to simulate the physical and psychological environment of a Martian exploration mission. These habitats are used to study the equipment and techniques that will be used to analyze the surface of Mars during a future crewed mission, and the simulated isolation of the volunteer inhabitants allows scientists to study the medical and psychosocial effects of long-term space missions. They are often constructed in support of extensive Mars analogs (see List of Mars analogs). However, sometimes existing natural places are also valued as Mars analogs. Crewed Mars habitats are featured in most human Mars missions; an alternative may be terraforming or telepresence.

The ISS has also been described as a predecessor to Mars expedition. In relation to a Mars habitat, it was noted that they are both essentially closed systems.

== Scientific motivation ==
Mars analog habitats are established to prepare astronauts, engineers, and researchers for the future challenges of sending a crewed mission to Mars. These analogs are inhabited by small teams of volunteers and may operate under “Mars-like” conditions for a few days to over a year. Habitats are often located in areas that in some form resemble the environment of Mars, such as polar deserts. While living in the habitats, crew members are mostly isolated from the outside world, survive on a diet of freeze-dried food, and may conduct field experiments while wearing protective space suits. Meanwhile, researchers analyze the crew members’ medical and psychological conditions and study the social and teamwork dynamics of the crew.

== Historical missions, experiments, and results ==
=== Flashline Mars Arctic Research Station ===
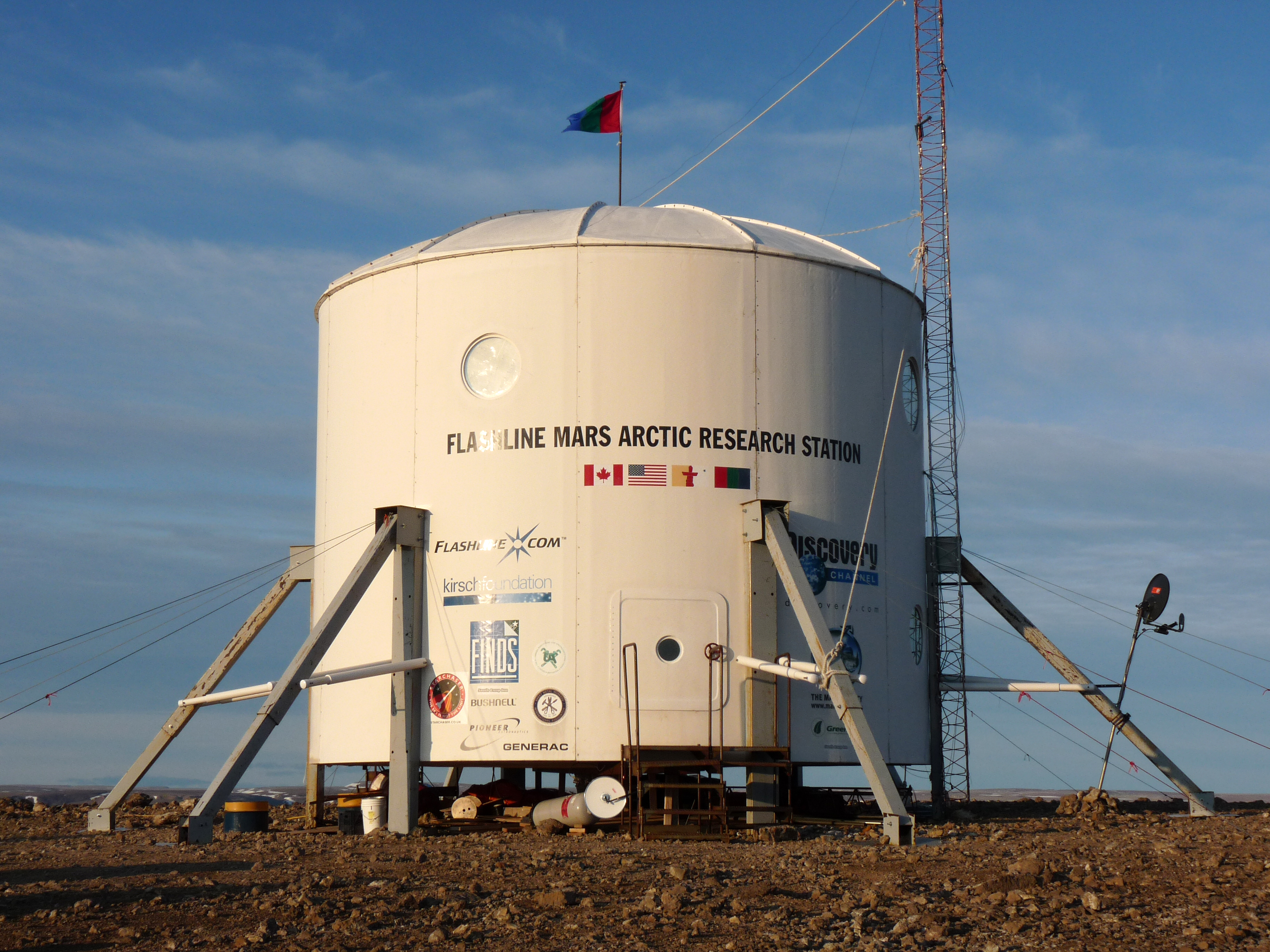
The FMARS hab in 2009

The Flashline Mars Arctic Research Station (FMARS) was established in 2000 in the territory of Nunavut, Canada. This station is the first Mars analog created by the Mars Society, a space advocacy group established in August 1998. Since the beginning of field operations in April 2001, twelve separate crews (consisting of 6–7 personnel, each) have inhabited the station. While most missions lasted less than a single month, FMARS Crew 11 remained in the Martian simulation for 100 days.

FMARS is guided by three goals set by the Mars Society: to serve as a testbed for human Mars exploration, to serve as a useful research facility at a Mars analog site, and to generate public support for sending humans to Mars. Research conducted by crewmembers while living in the habitat include an analysis of subsurface water detection techniques. Crewmembers set up seismic sensors along the Haughton crater while wearing prototype space suits, then tested how the sensors reacted to mini-earthquakes (produced by a sledgehammer) to produce a three-dimensional subsurface map.

Additional experiments examined how well the FMARS crewmembers could work with an “Earth-based” remote science team. In one example, the remote science team used aerial images to select ten regions of scientific interest for the FMARS crew to explore and analyze. This experiment helped researchers determine more efficient methods of scouting and investigating locations of interest under the communications limitations of a crewed mission to Mars. A study performed on the FMARS crew of July 2009 examined the psychological difficulties faced by crewmembers (especially the effects of isolation from family, conflicts among crewmembers, and diet) as well as the positive effects of problem-solving and exploration.

=== Mars Desert Research Station ===
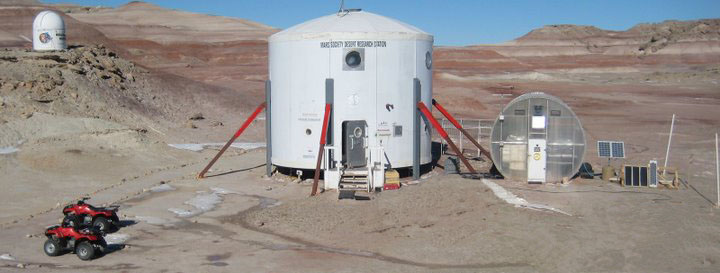
The Mars Society's Mars Desert Research Station

The Mars Desert Research Station (MDRS) is the second Mars analog habitat established by the Mars Society. Located on the San Rafael Swell in Utah, the MDRS has been inhabited by 130 individual crews (of roughly 6 members each) between the first field season in December 2001 and the twelfth field season ending in May 2013. Each crew typically remains in the habitat for one or two weeks. MDRS is less focused on the psychosocial aspects of space exploration than FMARS. Instead, crewmembers of MDRS focus on conducting field research in simulated Martian conditions.

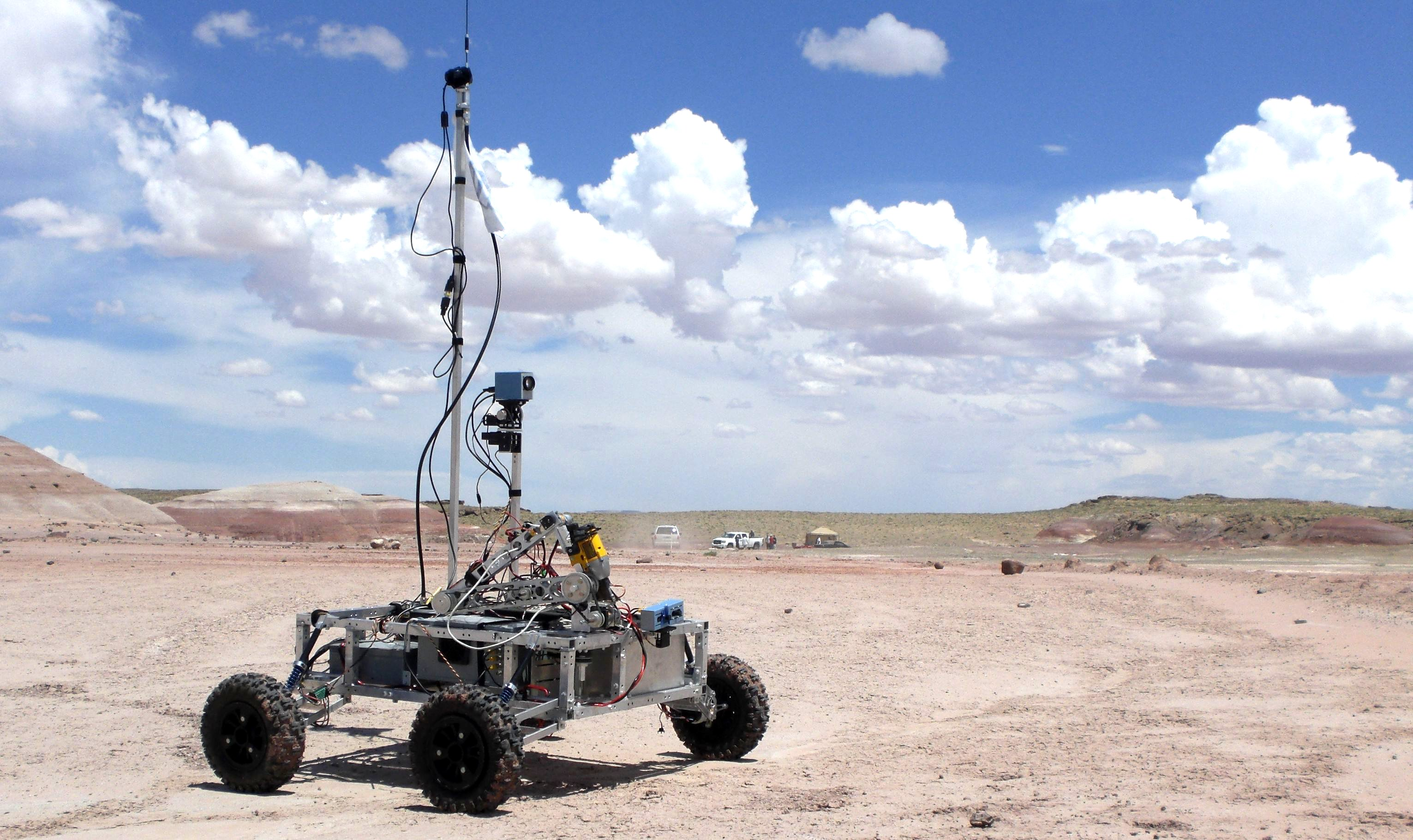
The BYU Mars Rover undergoing field tests at the Mars Desert Research Station

Several important research results have come out of the MDRS experiments. Crewmembers were able to detect methane in dry desert soils, developing techniques which could detect methane – an important biosignature – in the soil of Mars. Soil and vapor samples from the MDRS habitat were also found to contain significant amounts of methanogens, which were not previously suspected to thrive in a desert environment. This research supported the possibility of microbial life on Mars and demonstrated that crew members could detect such signs of life during an EVA.

=== Mars-500 ===
The Mars-500 mission was a series of experiments conducted between 2007 and 2011 and sponsored by Russia, the European Space Agency, and China. The primary focus of these experiments was to study the effects of long-term isolation on a small crew, so that the psychological difficulties of a voyage to Mars and an extended stay on its surface may be better understood. Three separate missions were performed: a 14-day isolation in November 2007, a 105-day isolation completed in July 2009, and a 520-day isolation from April 2010 to October 2011. Unlike other Mars Analog missions, Mars-500 did not take place in a Mars-like environment, but in a Moscow research institute.

An important focus of the Mars-500 research has been the early diagnosis of “adverse personal dynamics” which would affect cooperation among the crew, as well as the development of methods to overcome such issues. Researchers decided that any sort of psychological support on future missions would need to be tailored to each individual crew member, not just to the group as a whole or to subgroups belonging to different space agencies. Mars-500 also found that most psychological issues were exacerbated by isolation and a lack of stimulus, emphasizing the need to prevent sensory deprivation and boredom.

While female Russian biologist Marina Tugusheva participated in the 2007 experiment, women were reportedly excluded from the 2009 and 2011 missions to prevent issues caused by sexual tension. However, given the multinational nature of the crew, special efforts were made to promote efficient interaction among a multicultural crew.

=== HI-SEAS ===
The Hawaii Space Exploration Analog and Simulation (HI-SEAS) program is a series of missions organized by Cornell University and the University of Hawai'i at Mānoa. The habitat is located 2,400 meters (8,000ft) above sea level on Mauna Loa on the Big Island of Hawaii. The first HI-SEAS mission ran from April to August 2013, and a series of later missions have followed.

Like other missions, HI-SEAS evaluates the social and psychological status of the crewmembers while they live in isolation and conduct field work in Mars-like environments and conditions. Early missions focused on the diet and nutrition of its crewmembers. In particular, HI-SEAS studied how “food intake in a confined and isolated setting similar to what an astronaut would experience during a mission” affects the moods of the crew members and their interactions with each other. Crew members prepare their own meals using combinations of shelf-stable ingredients and pre-packaged meals and frequently complete surveys to determine their mood, health, and satisfaction with the food. More recent missions have focused on crew composition and communication, with specific focus on in-mission crew interaction and mission debrief technique.

HI-SEAS also undertakes research proposals submitted by outside researchers. As part of this effort, HI-SEAS is testing software which monitors psychological welfare by analyzing text-based communication, so that future astronauts’ limited access to psychiatric help is less of an issue. In addition, HI-SEAS is testing the durability of antimicrobial clothing used daily by the crew members.

=== CHAPEA ===
The CHAPEA (Crew Health and Performance Exploration Analog) habitat at NASA's Johnson Space Center will undertake a series of analog missions that will simulate year-long stays on the surface of Mars. Each mission will consist of four crew members living in Mars Dune Alpha, an isolated 1,700 square foot habitat.

CHAPEA Mission 1 began on June 25, 2023, with crew members Kelly Haston, Ph.D (commander), Ross Brockwell (flight engineer), Nathan Jones, M.D. (medical officer), and Anca Selariu, Ph.D (science officer).

=== LunAres ===
LunAres Research Station is a specialized analog research facility located in Piła, Poland, dedicated to isolation studies and simulating the planetary operations of a surface space habitat. Established in 2017 serves as a testbed for scientific research and technological development related to long-duration space missions.

The habitat was built at the post-military airport by Space Garden and designed by Space is More companies. The facility provides full isolation - the habitat is only connected to the old military aircraft hangar, in which there are 250 meters of extravehicular activity area.

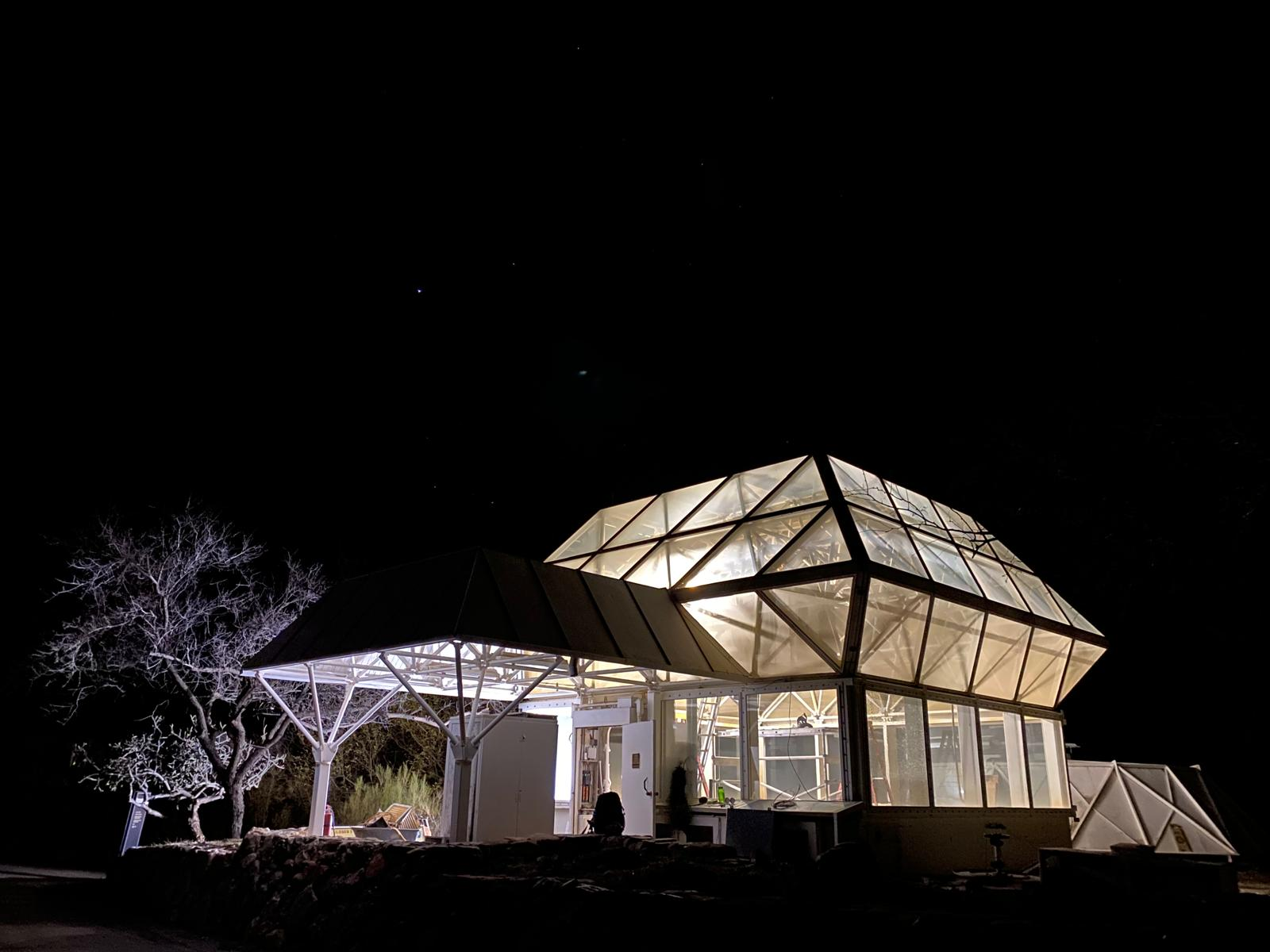
Original Biosphere 2 test module used for the Space Analog for the Moon and Mars.

=== Space Analog for the Moon and Mars (SAM) ===
Space Analog for the Moon and Mars (SAM) is a hermetically sealed and pressurized habitat located at Biosphere 2 under the management of the University of Arizona. Built by expanding the historic test module for the Biosphere, the facility is focused on crewed missions and research dedicated to ecosystem modeling and validation, in situ resource utilization, and human performance in space exploration.

== Possible future missions ==
The Flashline Mars Arctic Research Station, Mars Desert Research Station, and HI-SEAS missions are all ongoing. FMARS will launch a one-year mission (Mars Arctic 365) in August 2014. Just as in past missions, Mars Arctic 365 will consist of six volunteers with skills in fields such as geology, biochemistry, microbiology, and engineering, all of whom will conduct field research in Mars-like conditions while in contact with remote support teams. MDRS has scheduled additional short-term missions through May 2014. The Mars Society has planned to establish two more habitats in Mars-like desert locations: the European Mars Analog Research Station in Iceland, and the Australia Mars Analog Research Station in the Australian outback. While these stations were to be built in 2003, neither has moved past the planning stages, and the future of the missions is unclear.

== See also ==
- Australia Mars Analog Research Station
- Biosphere 2
- Climate of Mars
- Effect of spaceflight on the human body
- European Mars Analog Research Station
- Exploration of Mars
- Human mission to Mars
- Life on Mars
- List of crewed Mars mission plans
- Mars Analogue Research Station Program
- Mars Desert Research Station
- Mars habitability analogue environments on Earth
- Mars habitat
- Mars Society
- Mars to Stay
