= LunAres =

Analog space habitat in Poland

Coordinates: 53°10′29″N 16°43′35″E

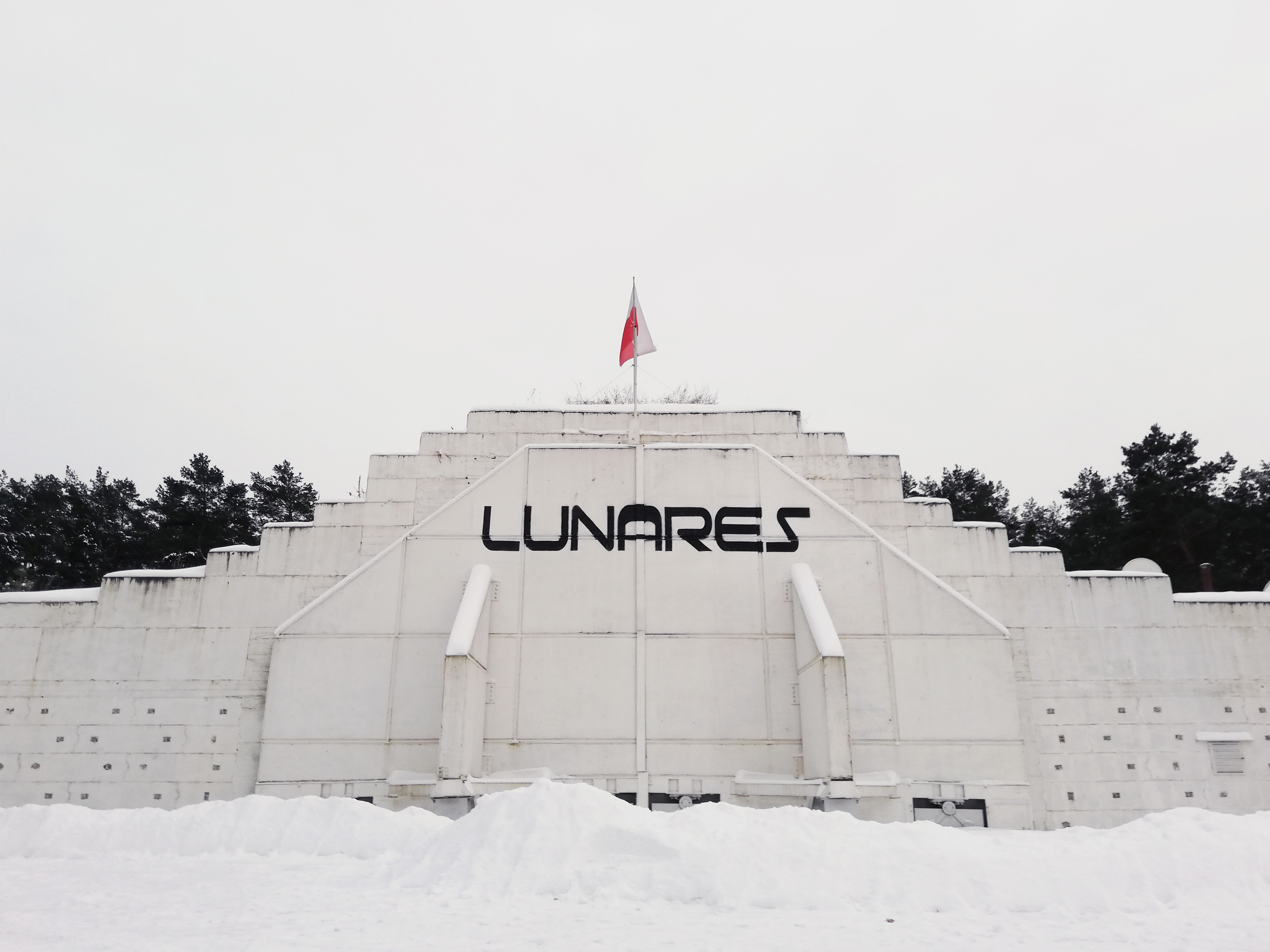
LunAres Research Station - view of the hangar, inside which there is a simulated lunar surface (EVA area)

LunAres Research Station is a specialized analog research facility located in Piła, Poland, dedicated to isolation studies and simulating the planetary operations. Established in 2017, LunAres serves as a testbed for scientific research and technological development related to long-duration space missions. The facility was designed and is operated by Space is More company led by space architects Leszek Orzechowski and Agata Mintus. The station enables researchers, engineers, and analog astronauts to study the effects of isolation, confinement, and other space mission challenges in a controlled setting, contributing insights to the future of human space exploration. The facility is used by various entities in the space industry, eg. European Space Agency (ESA) and German Aerospace Center (DLR). In 2025, an all female crew of 6 took part in the notable World's Biggest Analog mission from the habitat.

== Habitat ==
The habitat was built in 2017, at the post-military airport in Piła, Poland by Space Garden and designed by Space is More companies. The facility provides full isolation - the habitat is only connected to the old military aircraft hangar, in which there are 250 meters of extravehicular activity area. LunAres Research Station is composed of modules connected by an atrium. These modules are: Hygiene module, Biolab and medical room, Kitchen, Dormitory, Operations room, Storage and gym, Workshop, Airlock, and Atrium. Each module is equipped with all the necessities, that are crucial for conducting research, the safety of the crew, and their daily routines.

== AstroMentalHealth ==
AstroMentalHealth was one of 13 Polish experiments conducted during the IGNIS mission on the Ax-4 mission. The project enabled, a direct comparison of psychological data collected simultaneously on the International Space Station and in a terrestrial space habitat. As part of the study, astronauts completed daily psychological questionnaires, recorded video diaries, and documented key mission moments. A parallel analog mission was carried out at the Lunares Research Station, where identical procedures were implemented to mirror those performed in orbit. The experiment focused on monitoring astronauts’ mental health and behavioral adaptation in conditions of isolation, stress, and limited resources. The findings are expected to support the development of improved psychological monitoring and intervention methods for long-duration missions, as well as for individuals working in extreme environments on Earth.

== See also ==
- List of Mars analogs
- HI-SEAS
- Mars Desert Research Station
- Human mission to Mars
- Colonization of Mars
- Psychological and sociological effects of spaceflight
- List of European Space Agency programmes and missions
- LUNA Analog Facility
