= Mars Gravity Biosatellite =

Aborted low gravity research project

Program overview
- Country: Australia; USA
- Manager: University of Washington; MIT; University of Queensland
- Purpose: Study the effects of Mars-level gravity on mammals
- Status: Canceled

Program history
- Duration: 2001-2009
- First flight: 2010 or 2011 (planned)
- Launch site: Cape Canaveral Space Force Station (planned)

Vehicle information
- Uncrewed vehicle: Discoverer capsule
- Launch vehicle(s): Falcon 1E (planned); Minotaur IV (planned)

The Mars Gravity Biosatellite was a project initiated as a competition between universities in 2001 by the Mars Society. The aim was to build a spacecraft concept to study the effects of Mars-level gravity (~0.38g) on mammals.

Presentations were given to Robert Zubrin (Mars Society), and the award for best design was given to The University of Washington (UW). The UW team continued to develop the concept until the end of the school year (June 2002), after which funding became an issue. The team from UW contacted members of the team that presented from MIT, and the two universities agreed to continue development together. Later University of Queensland – Australia (UQ) joined the team as well. The program ended in 2009.

== Program history and overview ==
The Mars Gravity Biosatellite program began in 2001 as a Mars Society initiative called Translife that grew out of a discussion between Robert Zubrin and Elon Musk. It was intended to study the effects of the gravity of Mars (about one-third that of Earth) on mammals, for which no data was available. Over the next few years, the program grew both scope and vision, with staff and students from MIT (Payload), UW (Spacecraft Bus) and UQ (Reentry) collaboratively designing various parts of the mission concept. With ongoing funding challenges, UW and UQ withdrew after several years and Georgia Institute of Technology stepped in to build on their design work. The effort represented the most ambitious and complex student satellite project to date.

The mission concept was envisioned to carry 15 mice in low Earth orbit for five weeks. The satellite was designed to spin at approximately 32 rpm to generate centrifugal force that they would experience as gravity on the surface of Mars. At the end of its mission, the satellite would reenter Earth's atmosphere and its cargo of mice would be retrieved. In 2007, a tentative launch date for the Mars Gravity Biosatellite had been set for 2010 or 2011, as the primary payload on a Falcon 1E or a Minotaur IV launched from Cape Canaveral, Florida.

In 2005, the involved universities received a $200,000 NASA advanced projects development grant to support the development of a full payload engineering model. In 2006, the students of Mars Gravity developed a novel microfinancing platform called Your Name Into Space. This was meant to help finance the development of their spacecraft. This initiative is designed to give individuals and corporations the opportunity to fly images of their choice into orbit.

By the program's end in 2009, the project had engaged over 600 undergraduate, graduate, and high school students in aerospace engineering, space life sciences, and program management. Over 20 conference presentations and papers were published, earning multiple student awards.

On 24 June 2009, a status report was released declaring the end of this program, due to lack of funding and shifting priorities at NASA.

== Science ==
Gravity on Mars is only about 38% as strong as it is on Earth, and the long-term effects of such reduced gravity are unknown. Astronauts who are weightless for long periods of time lose significant amounts of bone and muscle mass. It is unclear if the gravity on Mars is strong enough to avoid or minimize these health problems. The Mars Gravity Biosatellite was meant to provide data on how mammalian health is affected by long-term exposure to lower levels of gravity, focusing on bone loss, changes in bone structure, muscle atrophy, and changes in the inner ear. The results from the five-week mission experiment would have been compared against a variety of Earth-based controls, including vivarium, hindlimb suspension, partial weight suspension, flight habitat effects, and short-radius centrifuge testing.

== See also ==
- Simulated gravity
