= TEMPO3 =

CubeSat-based satellite

TEMPO^{3}
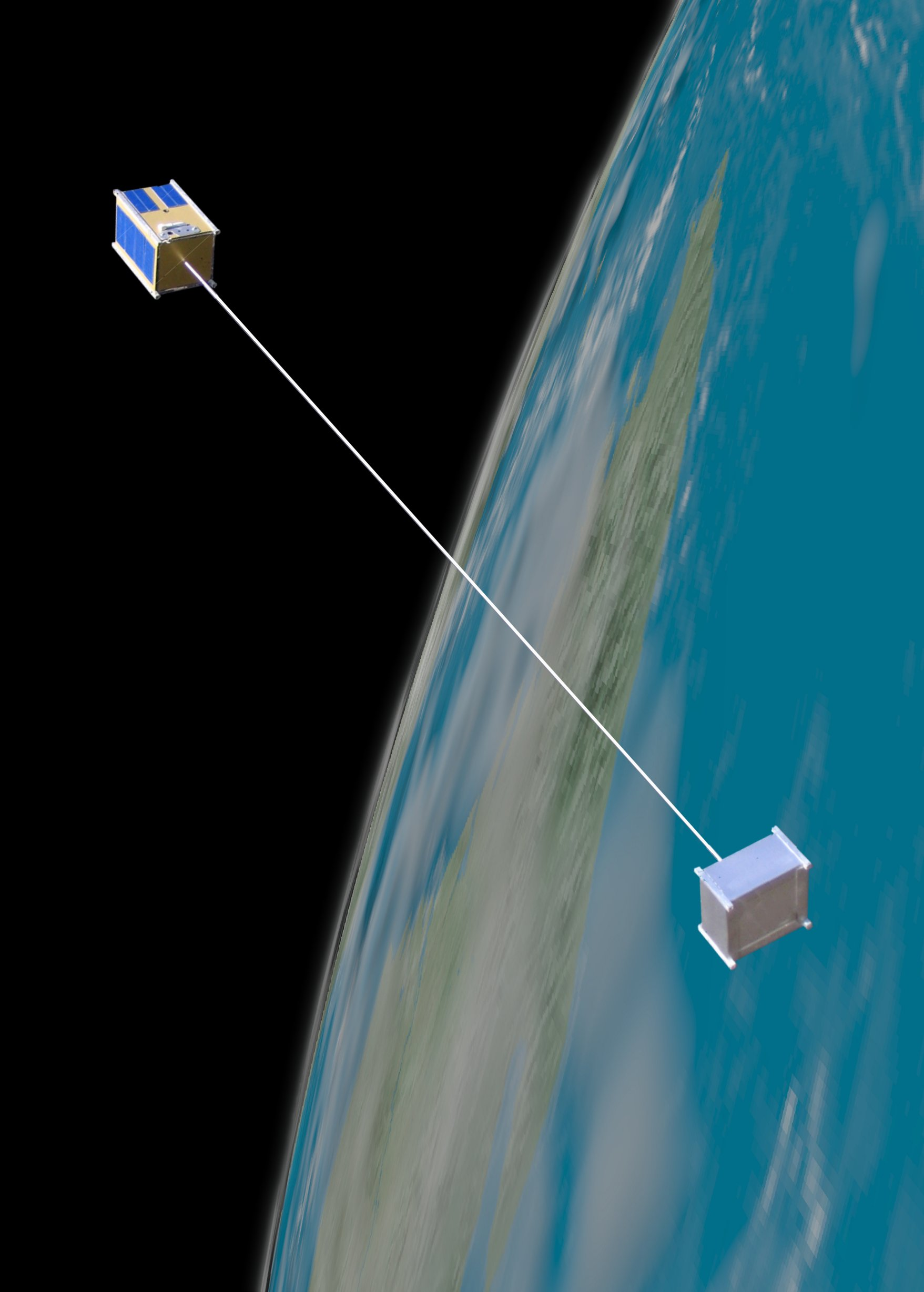
- Artist view of TEMPO^{3} in orbit.
- Applications: To demonstrate centripetal artificial gravity generation

Specifications
- Spacecraft type: Satellite

Capacity

Payload to {{{to}}}

The Tethered Experiment for Mars inter-Planetary Operations (TEMPO^{3}) is a proposed CubeSat-based satellite meant to demonstrate centripetal artificial gravity generation. After launch, the spacecraft will spin end over end to create gravity-like acceleration at both ends of a tether. The project is being run by the Mars Society. It aims building from high-altitude tests to eventual orbital flight. Status is unknown since 2012.

== Background ==
In the Mars Direct architecture for a humans-to-Mars mission, the crew on their way to Mars uses their discarded upper stage as a counterweight to spin end over end. This action generates gravity for the crew and prevents them from having to spend the six-month trip in zero-gravity conditions. Gemini 11 and 12 showed that the concept was viable, but no gravity-related work has taken place since then using tethers.

TEMPO^{3} was selected as the winner of the Mars Project Challenge, run by the Mars Society in 2008, to determine the group's next major project.

== Mission concept ==
The spacecraft will launch with other CubeSat satellites. After separating from its carrier, TEMPO^{3} will spin up and then split into two parts connected by a tether. Separating will slow the spin rate, but will increase the acceleration measured at the ends. Accelerometers on board the spacecraft will sense the amount of gravity being demonstrated and will beam that data to Earth.

== See also ==
- Tether satellite
- CubeSat
