= Astroland Agency =

Spanish private space company

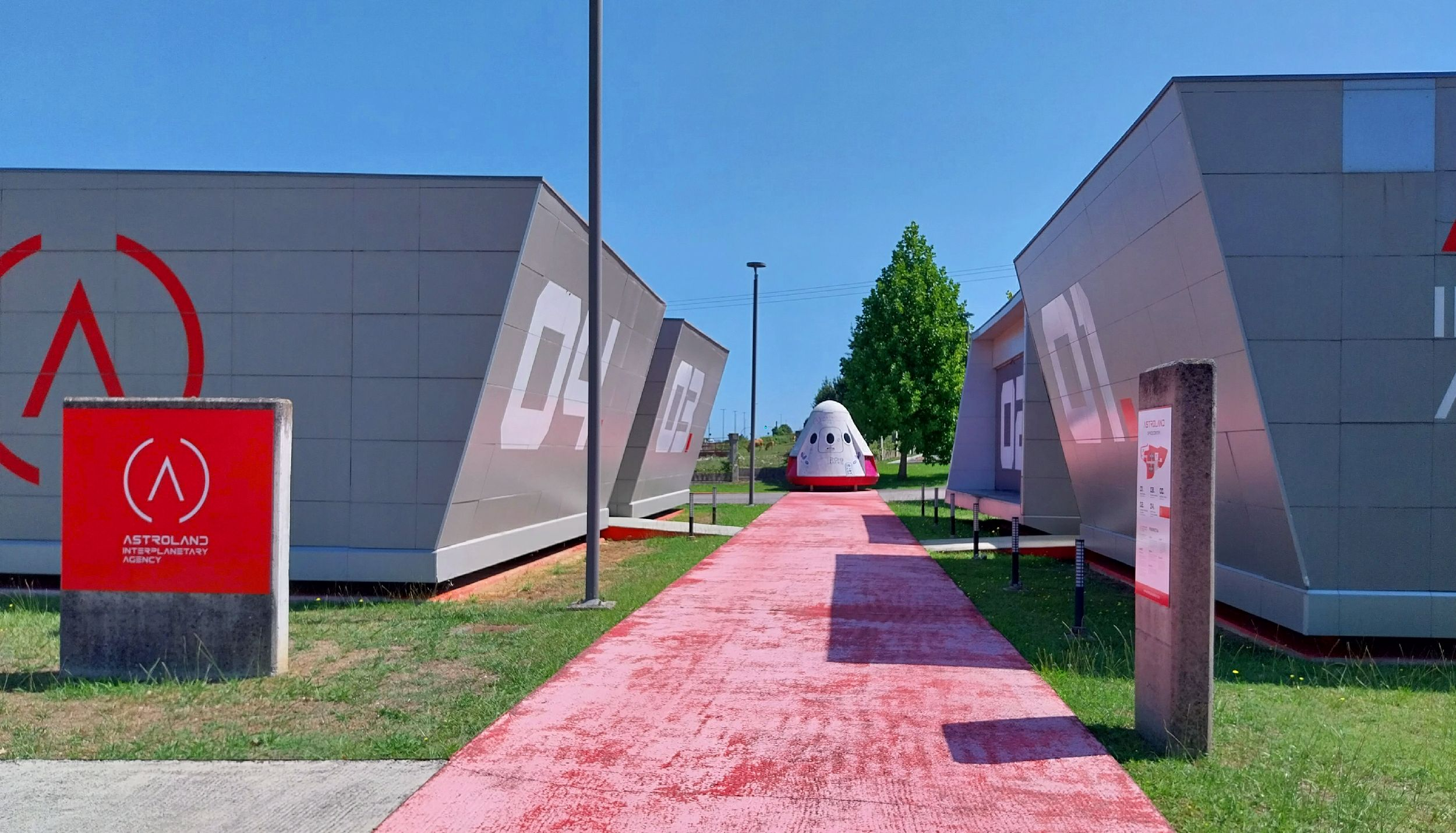
The Space Center of Astroland Interplanetary Agency, at the Science and Technology Park of Cantabria (PCTCAN) in Santander

Astroland Interplanetary Agency is a Spanish interplanetary agency based in Cantabria, Spain. Astroland operates the first permanent, plug-and -play subsurface analogue station inside a cave 1.5 km long and 60 meters high in Santander. Astroland is an aerospace startup acting as a research organization, whose main objective is to envision future living capabilities on Mars.

== History ==
Astroland was founded by David Ceballos in 2018. It was his childhood dream to explore the space and when he worked for Ministry of Culture and Heritage he got the chance to explore the Caves and came up with the idea to start the interplanetary agency.

The company lets analogue astronauts to experience Mars Analogue Habitat on Earth for the first time in a permanent plug and play subsurface analogue station, though there have been other Mars analogues in caves earlier this is the first and only of a permanent nature. It took around two years to locate the cave working alongside expert biologists, archaeologist, architects and environmental engineers.

== Overview ==
The main goal is to develop the skills and technology necessary to establish human colonies on Mars focusing on the habitat, with the aim of facilitating functional human habitats, that will be first deployed on the Moon and then on Mars.

The first step has been to set up the first and only permanent plug-and-play subsurface analogue station worldwide which provides fully equipped operational scenarios analogue to Mars /Moon lava tubes, since according to previous scientific research one of the most sensible things to do to be protected from the harsh Martian environment will be to settle underground, in the old Martian lava tubes.

Astroland Interplanetary Agency initiated the work on the project in 2016 and it took two years to convince the authorities to use the Cave in Arredondo (Cantabria) Santander. There are two main components of the agency: Ares Station and the Space Center.

== Facilities ==
=== The Space Center ===
It is a 5-module complex located at the Science and Technology Park of Cantabria. This experiment facility is the training camp for the Astrolanders, and of course, the Mission Control Center where every single aspect of the mission is monitored remotely, from the astrolanders vital constants and metabolic parameters, to audio and visual contact, communications with the station are time delayed to simulate the time it takes for each message to travel from Earth to Mars.

The participants first go through remote training program. These trainings include: mental, physical, nutritional, technical, and moral couching. Then, the next phase consists of physical, psychological and operational training at the Space Center: induction to caving, rope climbing and abseiling, rescue and self-rescue techniques, decision making and risk assessment, confine spaces awareness, claustrophobia, stress, coping with emergencies and risks such as slips, trips and falls .

=== Ares Station ===
Ares Station is the cave where the mission takes place. Before entering Ares Station, the Astrolanders are geared up in astrosuits (astronaut-like suits for analogue missions).

The Astrolanders stayed in the main habitat Alpha Base, with capacity for 8 crew members, fully equipped with all the necessary welfare facilities and apparatus for running the experiments, such as sleeping cubicles, vacuum toilets, exercise and work stations, high resolution microscopes, hydroponic culture laboratory, 3D printers, hygiene kits, and lyophilised food.

At the deep end of the cave there is also an exploration outpost, a life capsule with capacity for 2 people.

== Awards ==
The company has won the following awards:

- 2nd Prize in SME of the Year 2021
- XXI Entrepreneur Award Finalist
- Yuzz Cantabria 2017 finalist
