= LUNA Analog Facility =

European spaceflight testbed in Cologne

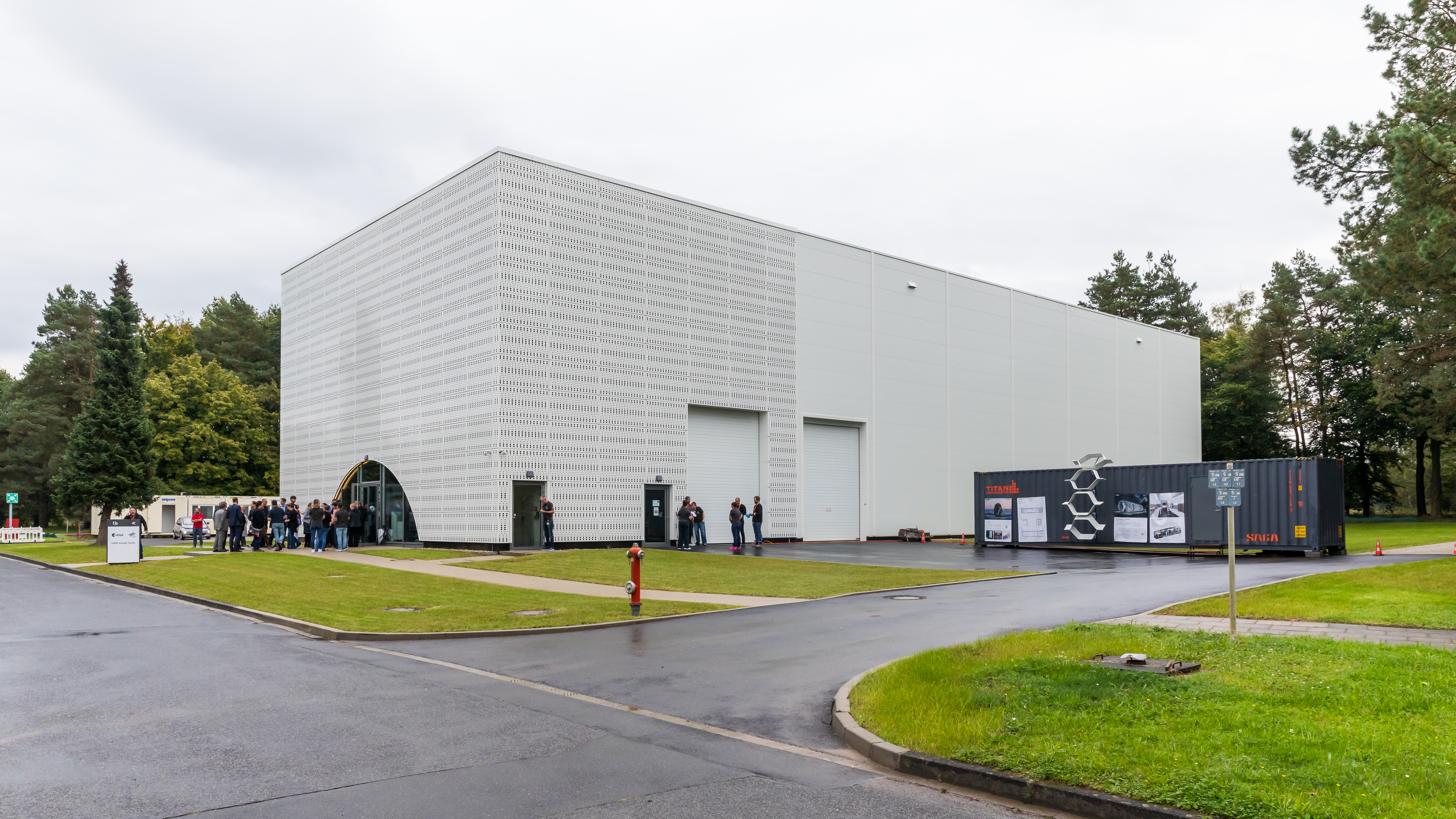
LUNA exterior

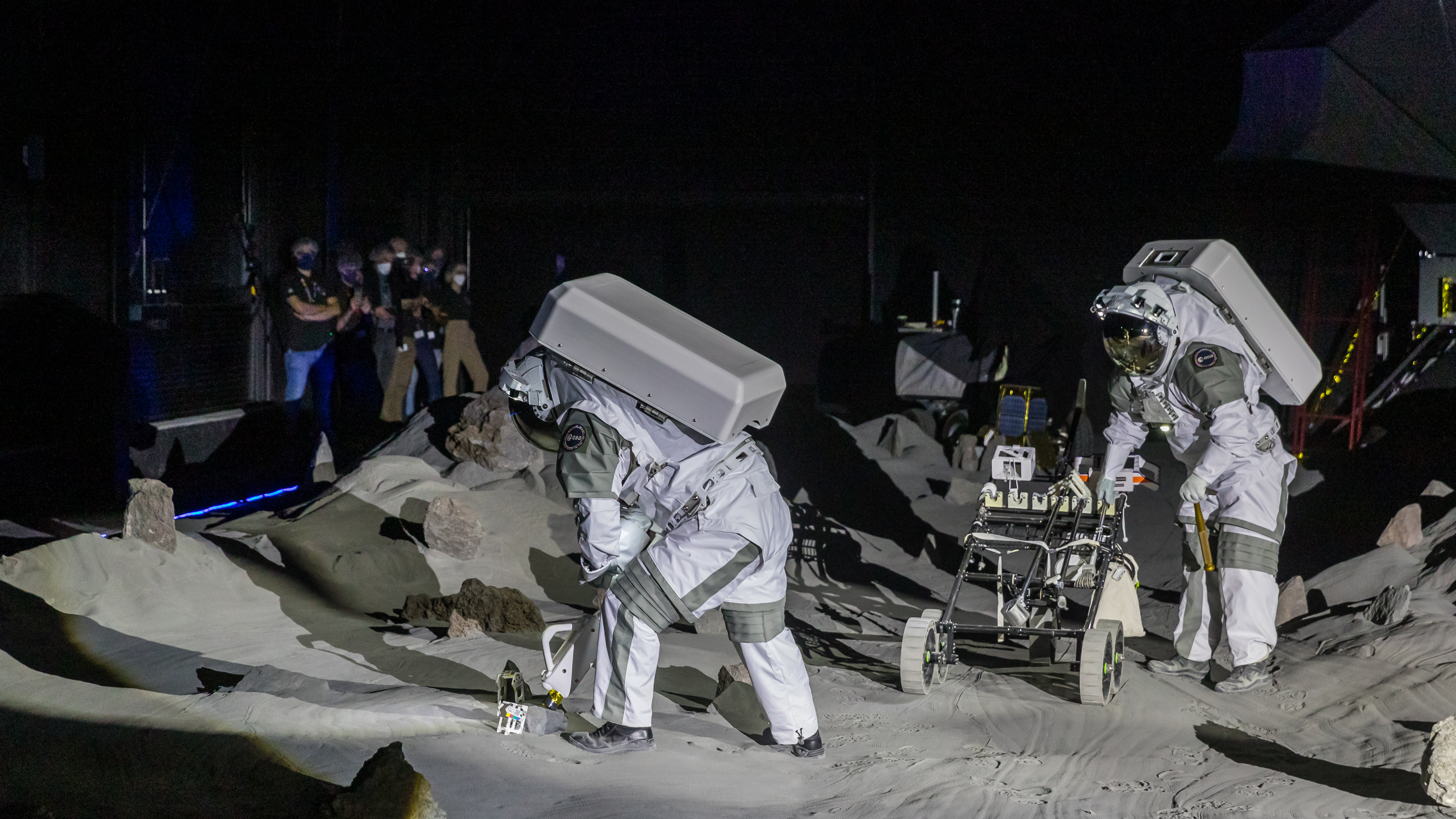
Inside LUNA

The LUNA Analog Facility is a facility designed to prepare for future missions to the Moon. It is located in Cologne-Porz and was developed in collaboration between DLR and ESA. The facility was opened on 25 September 2024. In cooperation with NASA, it is also intended to support preparations for the Artemis program. It contains a "lunar hall" measuring around 700 square metres and filled with 900 tonnes of analog lunar regolith, in which the environmental conditions of the Moon are simulated, enabling the testing of procedures and technologies for lunar missions.

== See also ==
- List of European Space Agency programmes and missions
- Terrae Novae – European programme for human spaceflight and robotic space exploration
- LunAres – Analog space habitat in Poland
