= Mars Society =

Advocacy group for Mars exploration

The Mars Society
- Formation: 13 August 1998 (28 years ago)
- Founder: Robert Zubrin
- Tax ID no.: 31-1585646
- Legal status: Nonprofit organization, 501(c)(3)
- Purpose: Advocacy for Mars exploration and colonization
- Region served: Worldwide, with a focus in the United States
- Website: www.marssociety.org

The Mars Society is a nonprofit organization that advocates for human exploration and colonization of Mars. It was founded by Robert Zubrin in 1998 and its principles are based on Zubrin's Mars Direct philosophy, which aims to make human missions to Mars as feasible as possible. The Mars Society generates interest in the Mars program by garnering support from the public and through lobbying. Many current and former Mars Society members are influential in the wider spaceflight community, such as Buzz Aldrin and Elon Musk.

Since its founding, the Mars Society has organized events and research activities. It has hosted its annual International Mars Society Convention and operated research projects such as the Flashline Mars Arctic Research Station and the Mars Desert Research Station, both using Mars analog habitats. Both of the stations are placed in remote locations for research. Crew members perform simulated extravehicular activities, carry out research assignments and reside at the station on strictly rationed supplies. The organization also hosts a college robotics competition in Utah called the University Rover Challenge.

== Structure ==
The Mars Society is a 501(c)(3) nonprofit organization that is funded by donations and operated by volunteers. Membership to the Mars Society is available to all on payment of a small fee. The society's aims are garnering public support for human Mars missions, lobbying government and space agencies, and verifying mission proposals via Mars analog habitats. These goals were set out in the Founding Declaration of the Mars Society.

The Mars Society's founder and current president is Robert Zubrin. Notable current and former members of the organization include Buzz Aldrin, Elon Musk, Gregory Benford and James Cameron. The society is a member of the Alliance for Space Development and has chapters in Australia, Canada, Europe, Japan, and many other countries. Since its foundation in 1998, the society organizes the annual International Mars Society Convention, with presentations primarily about Mars exploration and colonization.

In the 2019 filing to the Internal Revenue Service, the Mars Society reported to receive around US$400,000 in donations per year. Some noteworthy expenses include the annual Mars Society convention (US$58,800), the Mars Desert Research Station (US$200,000), and the University Rover Challenge (US$46,500). The Mars Society's Taxpayer Identification Number is 31-1585646.

== Philosophy and propositions ==
Video lecture from Robert Zubrin about Mars Direct and critiques on NASA's human Mars mission proposals, as part of Ames Research Center's 75th-anniversary lecture series (2014)

Many of the Mars Society's members believe that a human mission to Mars is achievable within a decade (as laid out in Zubrin's Mars Direct concept) and such a mission would lay the foundation for the colonization of Mars. The Mars Direct philosophy, a simplified approach to a human exploration mission to Mars, has permeated through the society's lobbying efforts. During testimony to the 2009 Augustine Commission, a panel set up by the Obama administration to outline the future of the U.S. space program, Zubrin advocated initiating a lean human Mars program in a similar manner to Mars Direct. The committee was indifferent to the testimony; in the final report, the commission concluded that a human Mars mission in general would "demand decades of investment and carry considerable safety risk to humans".

In 2005, Robert Markley, a science fiction researcher, pointed out that Zubrin used his president of the Mars Society position to espouse his own views on how human missions to Mars should be carried out. To make the Mars Direct plan appealing to the American public, he compared Mars to the Great American Frontier and the colonization of Mars as a way to resolve social stagnation and "Hobbesian despair" on Earth. Mars would be a way to give birth to an ideal society. In effect, Markley commented, Zubrin has created an "interplanetary vision of manifest destiny". Most members of the Mars Society agreed with the less extreme version of Zubrin's ideal, in that colonizing Mars is critical for preventing a dystopian future for humankind.

Oliver Morton commented in 2003 that the Mars Society is a fundamentally "utopian and escapist organization". He observed that many Mars Society convention participants were unhappy with government space programs. As a consequence, they favored funding alternatives that are often impractical, such as sponsorship deals, private philanthropy, and Martian bonds (on the basis of future resources and profits). Markley commented in 2005 that the Mars Society is somewhat similar to the Royal Society at its founding in the 17th century: "as much of a social club of enthusiasts as a professional scientific organization", with influences from science fiction. In a way, he continued, the Mars Direct plan provided a grand vision for future Martian endeavors to follow and the Mars Society is a platform for exploring the implications of Mars colonization.

== Background and founding ==
The forerunner of the Mars Society was a small network of space enthusiasts colloquially known as the Mars Underground, which emerged around 1978. The members of this network were frustrated by the U.S. administration's lack of attention to Mars exploration. Most members belonging to the group were researchers and graduate students, which included Chris McKay, Penelope Boston, Tom Meyer, Carol Stoker, and Carter Emmart. This is part of the reason some Mars Society members held environmentalism and counterculture ideals. In April 1981, the Mars Underground organized the first Case for Mars convention about Mars exploration at the University of Colorado. The Case for Mars conventions were held every three years until the sixth and final one in 1996.

At the now-defunct aerospace company Martin Marietta, Robert Zubrin – who had attended the third Case for Mars convention in 1987 – and engineer David Baker developed the human Mars mission plan, titled Mars Direct. They published their plan for NASA and the public to review in early 1990. The core tenet of the Mars Direct plan is to use existing technologies and eliminate the need for dangerous space rendezvous or an expensive space station. A modified Mars Direct plan (called NASA Design Reference Mission 3.0) was budgeted by NASA at US$20 billion; less than one-twentieth the cost of the Mars mission plan in NASA's Space Exploration Initiative (US$250–500 billion).

In 1996, Zubrin published The Case For Mars, the same year as the last Case for Mars convention took place. The book criticized prior Mars exploration mission proposals for being too costly and complicated, proposed an alternative mission plan based on the Mars Direct plan, gave philosophical arguments for it and rebutted criticisms of the plan.

The Mars Society was founded by Zubrin on 13 August 1998 during the Mars Society's first convention in Boulder, Colorado, the same place where the first Case for Mars convention took place 17 years earlier. With a duration of four days, the convention was attended by 750 persons and can be seen as a successor to the prior Case for Mars conventions. Some of those invited were from the Mars Underground or had written to Zubrin about The Case For Mars. The Mars Society's founding convention in August 1998 emphasized its focus on the Mars Direct plan and efforts of lobbying the government, holding that there was no technical reason that would prevent a human mission to Mars within a decade. The first convention saw the signing of the Founding Declaration of the Mars Society which outlined primary goals for the society, amidst rifts between Mars Society members' Martian ideals.

On the second day of the convention, there was an intense debate about the ethics of Mars terraforming, which science writer Oliver Morton described as 'rancorous'. The moderator of the debate was Chris McKay. On one side of the debate were Zubrin and a few other people, who championed that terraforming is the end goal of Mars colonization. On the other side of the debate, the audience reminded them that for life on Mars, the act of terraforming will be similar to that of Native American genocide. The terms 'Lebensraum' and 'manifest destiny' used by the Zubrin side were prohibited in later conventions. The next few conventions organized additional debates between proponents of nuclear power/terraforming and environmentalists.

== Past activities ==
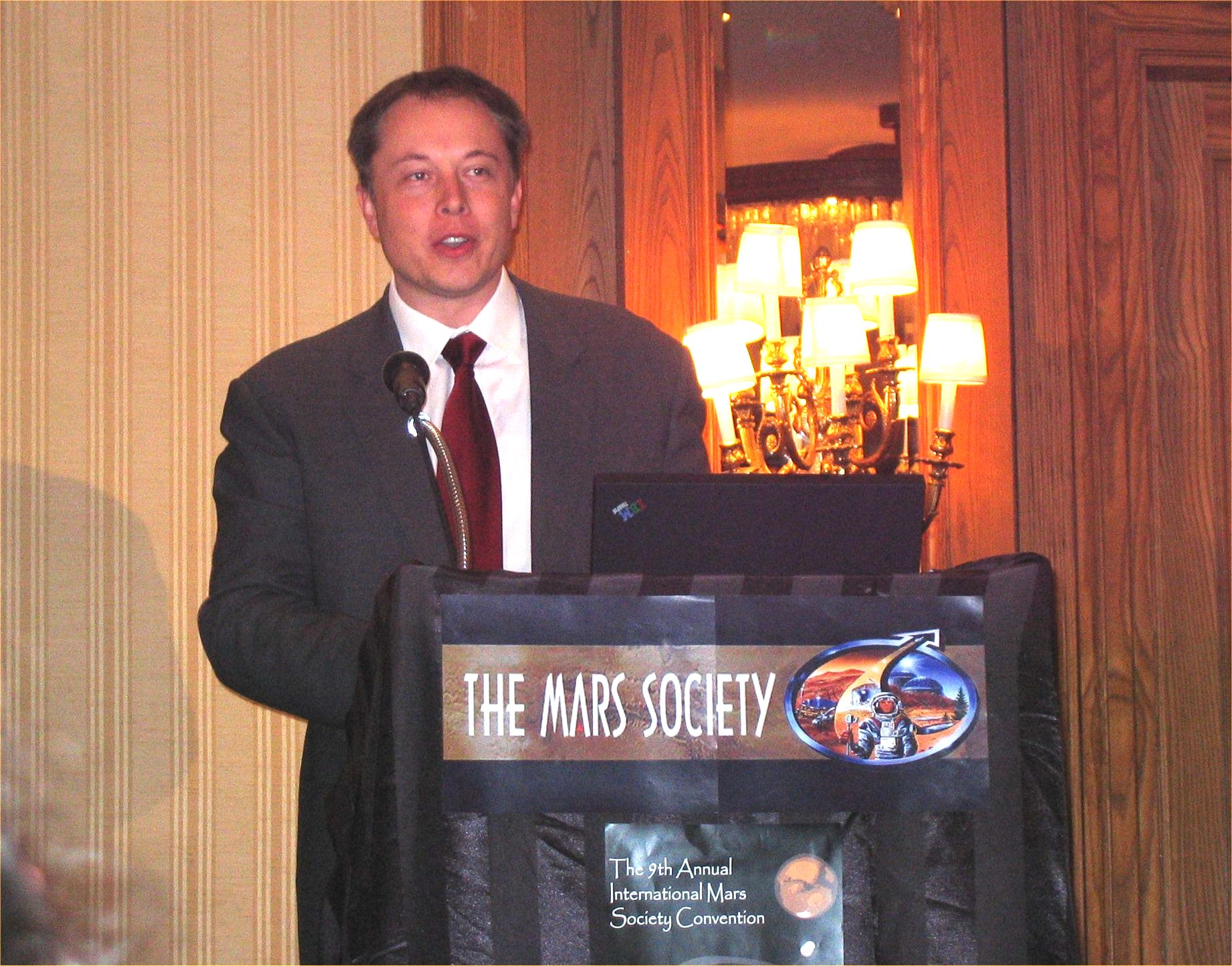
Musk giving details about Falcon 9 and Dragon spacecraft at the 2006 Mars Society convention

In Zubrin's book "The Case for Mars", he recounts how the big break for the Mars Society came when Michael D. Griffin advocated for their ideas to then NASA Administrator Daniel Goldin. Later in mid-2001, the Mars Society received a US$5,000 check from Elon Musk at a fundraiser event. After briefly researching Mars concepts and missions, Musk joined the Mars Society's board of directors and gave it US$100,000. In August 2001, Musk left the Mars Society after a meeting with its members and established a temporary foundation for his publicity projects, despite pleas for collaboration from Zubrin. In a public presentation at the 4th Mars Society convention, Musk stated that the Mars Society might have a purpose in his efforts. By April 2002, Musk had abandoned the temporary foundation entirely; instead, he founded SpaceX to build a low-cost rocket and invited aerospace engineers whom he had met at Mars Society-sponsored trips. In the following years, Musk kept in contact with the Mars Society, as is evident in his presentation of the Falcon 1 rocket in 2008, his acceptance of the Mars Pioneer Award from the society in 2012 and his presentation at the society's 2020 convention.

After the first convention, the Mars Society decided to construct a Mars analog facility named Flashline Mars Arctic Research Station (FMARS) on Devon Island, Nunavut, Canada. The FMARS is the second Mars analog facility in the world; the first one is the Haughton–Mars Project. Some of FMARS's construction cost was paid by the Mars Society and the Haughton–Mars Project team. Other funding came from commercial sponsorship, such as with the Discovery Channel. FMARS was first occupied during a test run in July and August 2000. It began the first simulated mission around 2001. The money donated by Elon Musk was spent on the next Mars analog habitat, called the Mars Desert Research Station (MDRS). In December 2001, the habitat's construction near Hanksville, Utah, was completed.

From 2001 to 2005, Mars mission simulations in FMARS were around 2–8 weeks long and consisted of ten rotated crews. The first four-month-long mock mission took place in 2007, which revealed cultural conflicts and inadequate coping strategies. Shorter missions were carried out in 2009 and 2013, before another long-duration mission called Mars 160 was conducted in 2017, in collaboration with the MDRS. The crew stayed in MDRS for eighty days before being transferred to FMARS, rotating the crew every month. As of April 2020, the MDRS had hosted nineteen field seasons (one per year) totaling 236 crews, with each crew consisting of six or seven members.

The society also formulated plans to launch space-based experiments, which never materialized. In 2001, after a discussion between Zubrin, Musk and the board members, the Mars Society announced the Translife Mission, later renamed to the Mars Gravity Biosatellite. The mission aimed to study the effect of Martian-level gravity on mice, with satellite construction supported by students from the Massachusetts Institute of Technology (MIT) and Georgia Tech. In August 2008, the Mars Society announced the project TEMPO^{3} after a preliminary selection of proposals. TEMPO^{3} was conceived as a system of two CubeSats attached to a tether and spun with carbon dioxide-powered thrusters, aimed to demonstrate rotational artificial gravity system in space. Neither of these proposals were built: the Mars Gravity Biosatellite was canceled in June 2009 due to a lack of funding and no further development of TEMPO^{3} has been reported since the initial proposal.

At the Mars Society's 2015 convention, a debate was organized between two representatives of Mars One (CEO Bas Lansdorp and Barry Finger) and two researchers from MIT (Sydney Do and Andrew Owens). Mars One, a now-defunct non-profit organization founded in 2011, aimed to establish a human settlement on Mars through a one-way mission called Mars to Stay. The MIT researchers criticized the plan as infeasible and suicidal. According to Dwayne A. Day from The Space Review, the MIT team won the debate by making specific and realistic arguments. He also noted that the popularity of Mars One had dwarfed that of the Mars Society, stating that the perceived absurdness of Mars One may potentially be detrimental to the Mars Society's reputation.

In 2021, around a week before the first crewed New Shepard mission, Blue Origin donated US$1 million to the Mars Society and 18 other space-related organizations. The donation money came from a seat auction in that New Shepard flight. The donation well exceeded the Mars Society annual revenue, which was reported to be less than $400,000 in a filing with the Internal Revenue Service.

== Current projects ==
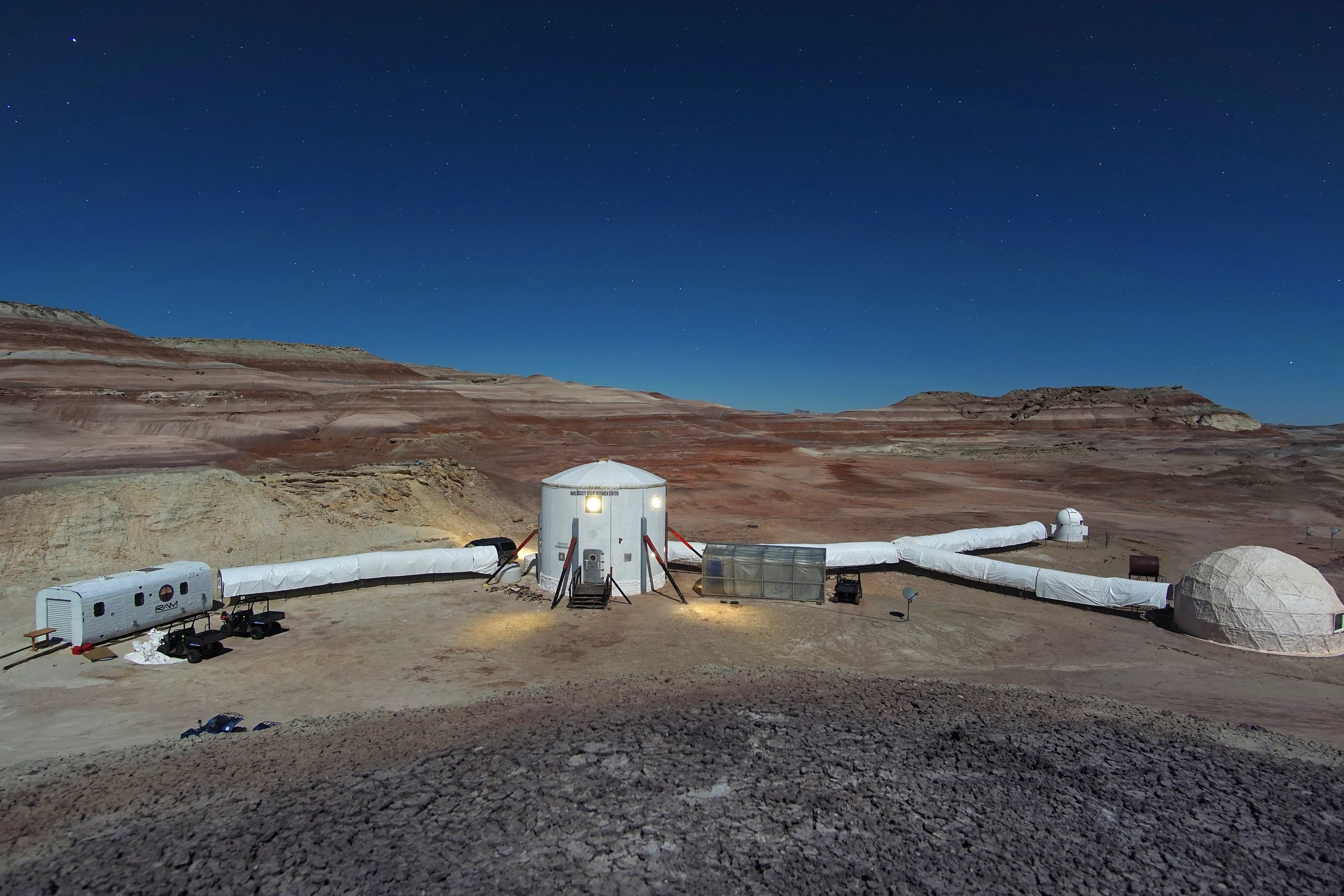
Mars Desert Research Station in Hanksville, Utah, with a central habitat, rover hangar, dome, greenhouse and an observatory

The Mars Society's premier project is the Mars Analog Research Station Program. The program aims to further the understanding of Mars missions' technical and human factors via its two Mars analog habitats: the Flashline Mars Arctic Research Station (FMARS) and the Mars Desert Research Station (MDRS). The FMARS is located on Devon Island in Canada and near the Haughton impact crater, above the 75th parallel north where the island is uninhabited and barren. The MDRS is located near Hanksville, Utah, where the habitat is isolated from civilization. Both stations' locations are chosen for the landscape similarities with Mars. Because these stations are meant for research, both FMARS and MDRS are closed to public visits. These stations are staffed by volunteers with degrees in planetary science, geology, and engineering.

The Mars Society has plans to build additional analog stations. The Euro-MARS, operated by the Mars Society's European chapter, was intended to have three decks and more extensive facilities. However, during transport from the United Kingdom to the deploying location at Krafla, Iceland, the Euro-MARS sustained irreparable damage. It was reported in 2017 that Euro-MARS was back at the planning phase, but no further updates about the station are available. The Mars Society is also planning to build another Mars analog station in Arkaroola, Australia, as of October 2022. The station would replicate a spacecraft launching directly from the Earth's surface, featuring a mock propulsion module, heat shield and landing engines.

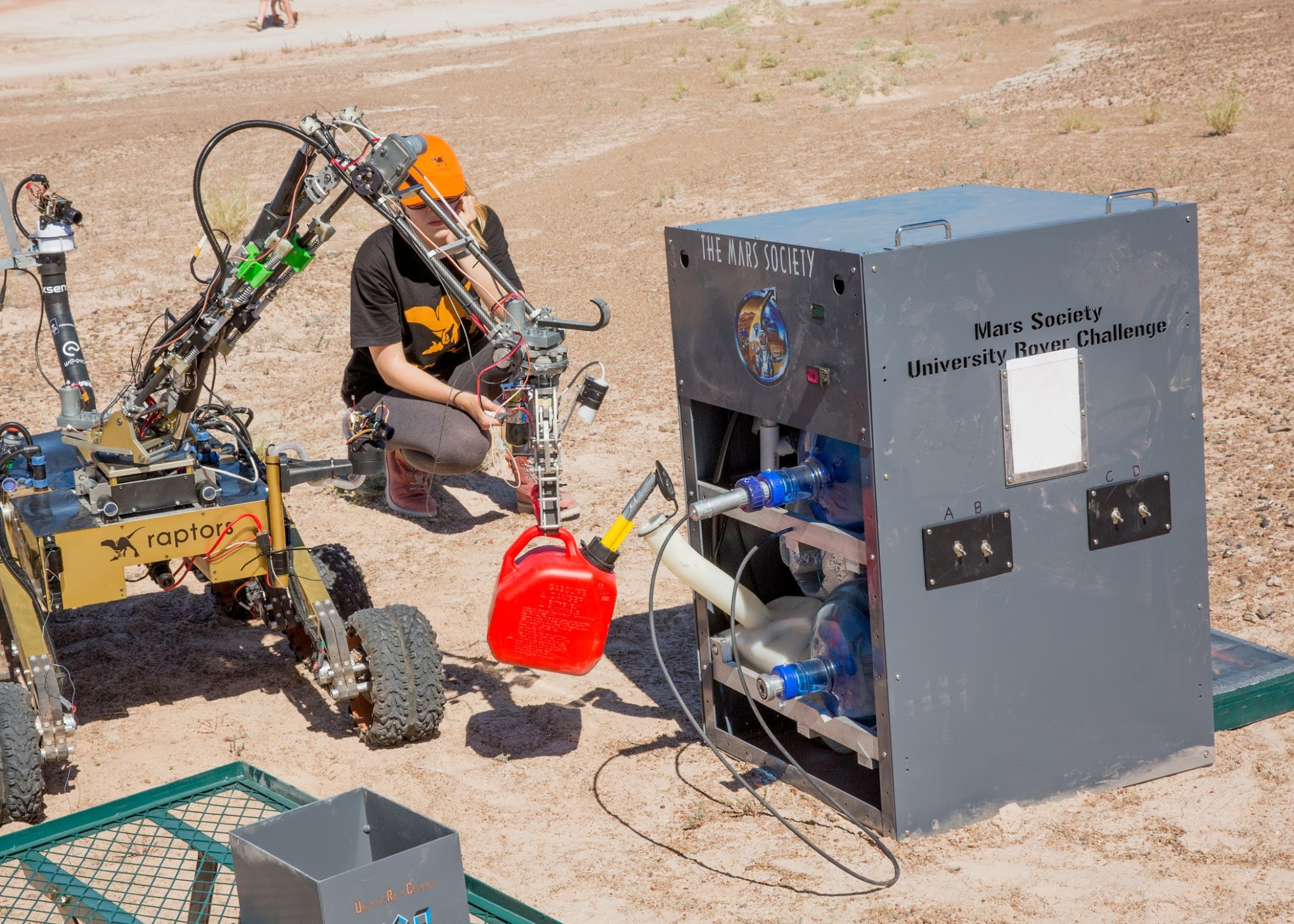
A challenge in the University Rover Challenge where rovers have to pour fuel into a generator

As well as research, the Mars Society organizes the Rover Challenge Series, a group of annual university competitions for making mock Martian rovers. Around May and June each year, the three-day University Rover Challenge takes place in Utah's desert near the MDRS where teams compete in exploration tasks. The rover's operators must only use sensor data for navigation, similar to actual Martian rovers. Similar regional competitions that belong to the Rover Challenge Series include the European Rover Challenge, the Canadian International Rover Challenge and the Indian Rover Challenge.

MarsVR Project is a virtual reality program that simulates MDRS and terrain one square mile around the base. The program was made in collaboration with a local virtual reality company. MarsVR is used to train MDRS's crews by simulating the use of spacesuits, airlocks, rovers and activities such as cooking. The software can also simulate playing sports on Mars such as soccer and mountaineering. The exploration portion of MarsVR is free to download on Steam, however, the training part has an attached cost for the public.

In 2023, the Mars Society established the non-profit Mars Technology Institute and the corresponding C corporation Mars Technology Lab to research solutions for labor, agriculture, and energy problems in the colonization of Mars. The Institute plans to outsource research to universities before building its own campus.

== See also ==
- Moon Society
- National Space Society
- Space advocacy
- The Planetary Society
