= University Rover Challenge =

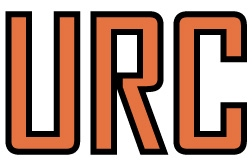
- Purpose: Education
- Frequency: Annually
- Inaugurated: 2006
- Headquarters: Mars Desert Research Station; Hanksville, Utah

The University Rover Challenge (URC) by the Mars Society is a robotics competition for university level students that challenges teams to design and build a rover that would be of use to early explorers on Mars. The competition is held annually at the Mars Desert Research Station, outside Hanksville, Utah in the United States. The site was selected by the Mars Society for its geographic similarity to Mars: In addition to being a largely barren desert area, the soil in the area has a chemical composition similar to Martian soil. The competition has also expanded internationally to include the European Rover Challenge, Canadian International Rover Challenge, Indian Rover Challenge, Anatolian Rover Challenge and the Australian Rover Challenge.

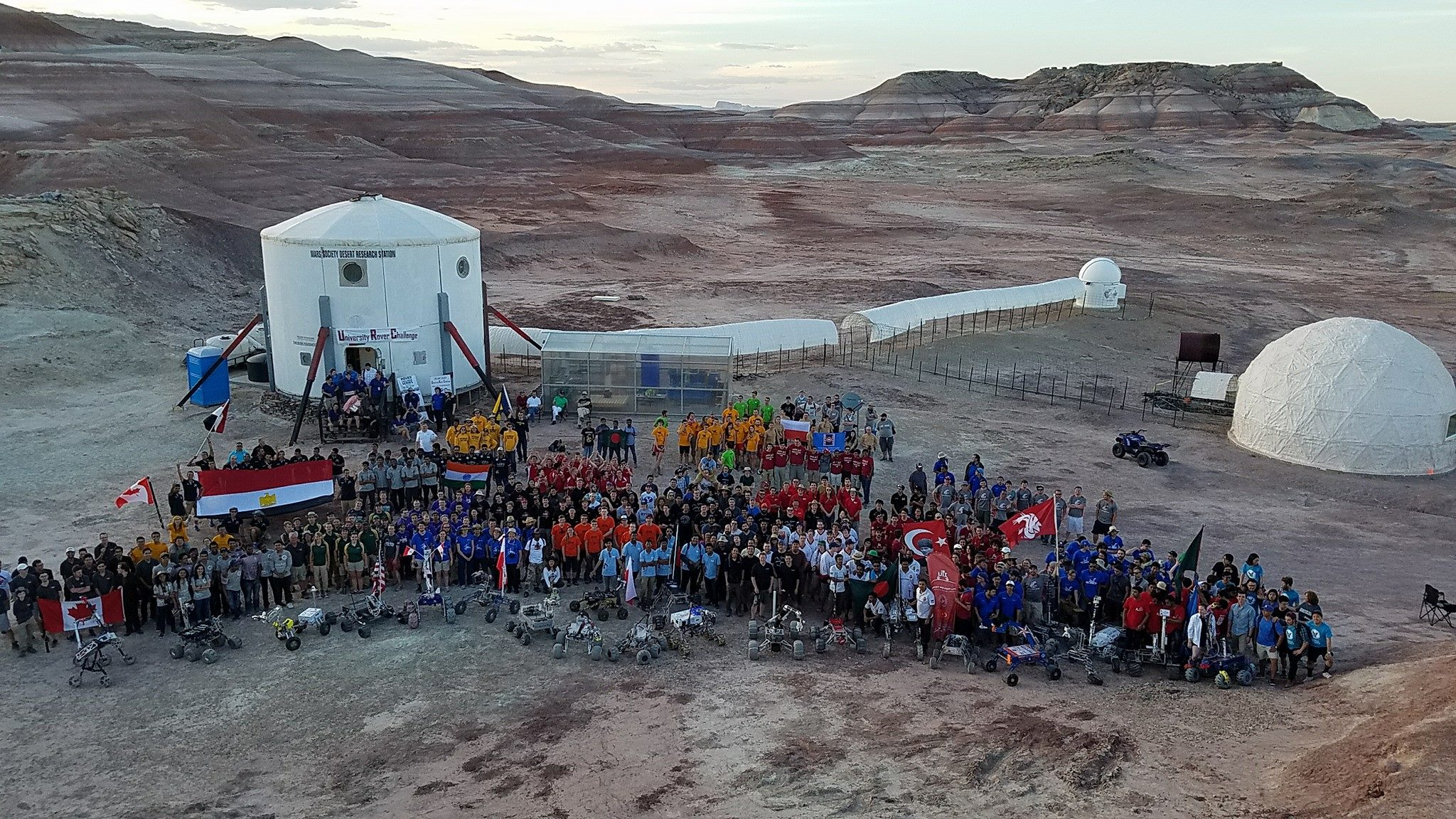
Group photo from 2017 Mars Society University Rover Challenge at the Mars Desert Research Station near Hanksville, Utah.

The aim of the University Rover Challenge is to encourage students to develop skills in robotics, improve the state-of-the-art in rovers, and work in multi-disciplinary teams with collaboration between scientists and engineers. The competition was launched in 2006 with competitions held annually every summer since 2007.

== History ==
=== Inception ===
The URC was first established in 2006 with the goal of promoting STEM education and inspiring the next generation of space explorers. Since its inception, the competition has grown in scale and significance, attracting teams from universities and institutions worldwide.

The idea behind the URC's creation is that the kinds of rovers teams are building would assist astronauts in the field, controlled remotely by another astronaut. This imagined use case drives the competition's emphasis on teleoperation and ability to perform tasks that a human might need to. (Such as equipment servicing and retrieval and delivery)

In its first year, only 4 teams competed: University of Nevada Reno, Brigham Young University, Penn State University, and University of California Los Angeles. There were only 2 tasks, a Science Task, and a task to deploy a mock radio repeater in the field. URC spokesperson Kevin Sloan says they were unsure what to expect, but were "blown way by the quality". University of Nevada Reno won that year, winning a $5000 cash prize, which was reduced to $1000 in subsequent years.

=== Evolution of Tasks ===
Since its inception in 2006, with 4 US teams, the competition has grown substantially, with 95 teams from 12 countries in 2018, and a total of 35 rovers selected to compete, their teams totaling more than 500 students.

The tasks have also undergone significant changes over the years, evolving from the 2 simple tasks of the first year to the 4 robust tasks of 2019, and continuing to get more challenging every year. Detailed information about years 2007 - 2009 is unavailable, but by 2010 there were 4 tasks: Sample Return, Site Survey, Equipment Servicing, and Emergency Navigation. In its 2010 incarnation, sample return involved choosing a sample to bring back with the rover, then doing analysis on it at the base and presenting to the judges on its scientific significance. Site survey involved analysis of a site from potentially far away. Equipment servicing most notably required teams to plug in a 3-prong plug into an outlet, and emergency navigation was a timed challenge in which rovers were to locate astronauts as fast as possible. In addition to these tasks teams scored points on a presentation they gave to judges on the design of their rover.

The following two years saw tweaks in the content of tasks to make them increasingly challenging, but the spirit of each task remained the same. For example, in 2012, the emergency navigation task was designed such that in order to reach some of the astronauts rovers would need to pass into areas where they would lose communication with their operators and thus need to operate autonomously for a time.

In 2013 the Site Survey task was replaced with Terrain Traversing, which tested rovers capability of navigating through difficult terrain. 2016 introduced a formal down-selection process, including a CDR (Critical Design Review) which took the place of the Presentation task, and a semi-finals round of competition. The next year, 2017, replaced Astronaut Assistance with Extreme Retrieval and Delivery (a mix of astronaut assistance and terrain traversing), Sample Return with Science Cache, and Terrain Traversing with Autonomous Traversal, an entirely new challenge which explicitly required teams to implement autonomous behavior on their rovers.

Finally, 2018 and 2019 have seen this task structure preserved, with increases in difficulty and complexity. Notably, the 2019 Science task requires detection of life aboard the rover, whereas in 2018 teams could bring back samples to conduct tests at the base.

=== Teams ===
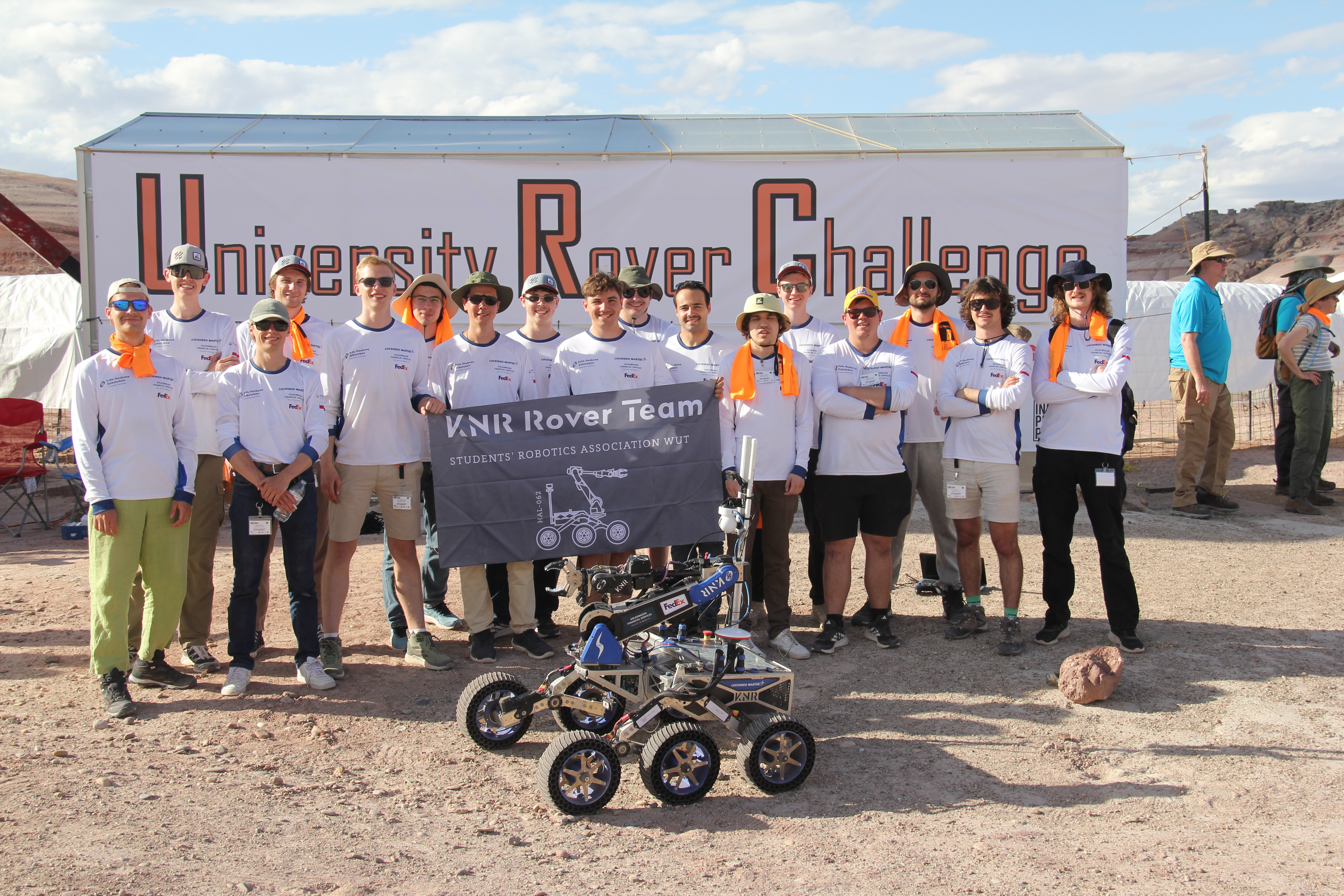
Students from the Warsaw University of Technology, Poland, with their HAL-062 rover (2026).

The number and diversity of teams has also grown significantly over the competition's lifespan. In 2018, 95 teams representing 10 different countries registered, 36 of which were selected to compete. Teams from the US generally make up the majority, but teams from Canada, Poland, and in more recent years, India, are also strongly represented. Poland in particular, fielding their first team in 2009, has been particularly competitive. A Polish team from Czestochowa University of Technology won the 2018 competition, making 6 consecutive years Poland has been represented on the podium.

Some teams have been competed for many years in a row. Notably the team from Brigham Young University is the only team to have participated in every competition from 2006 to 2018, consistently placing in the top 5. That team is funded primarily by the Mechanical Engineering, Electrical Engineering and Physics departments at BYU.

Team Stats
	Teams Registered	Teams Competed	Countries Represented
2006	4	4	1
2007	?		
2008	?		
2009	?		
2010	12	10	4
2011	9	8	3
2012	10?	5	2
2013	15	10	4
2014	31	23	6
2015	44	23	6
2016	63	28	7
2017	82	36	7
2018	95	36	10

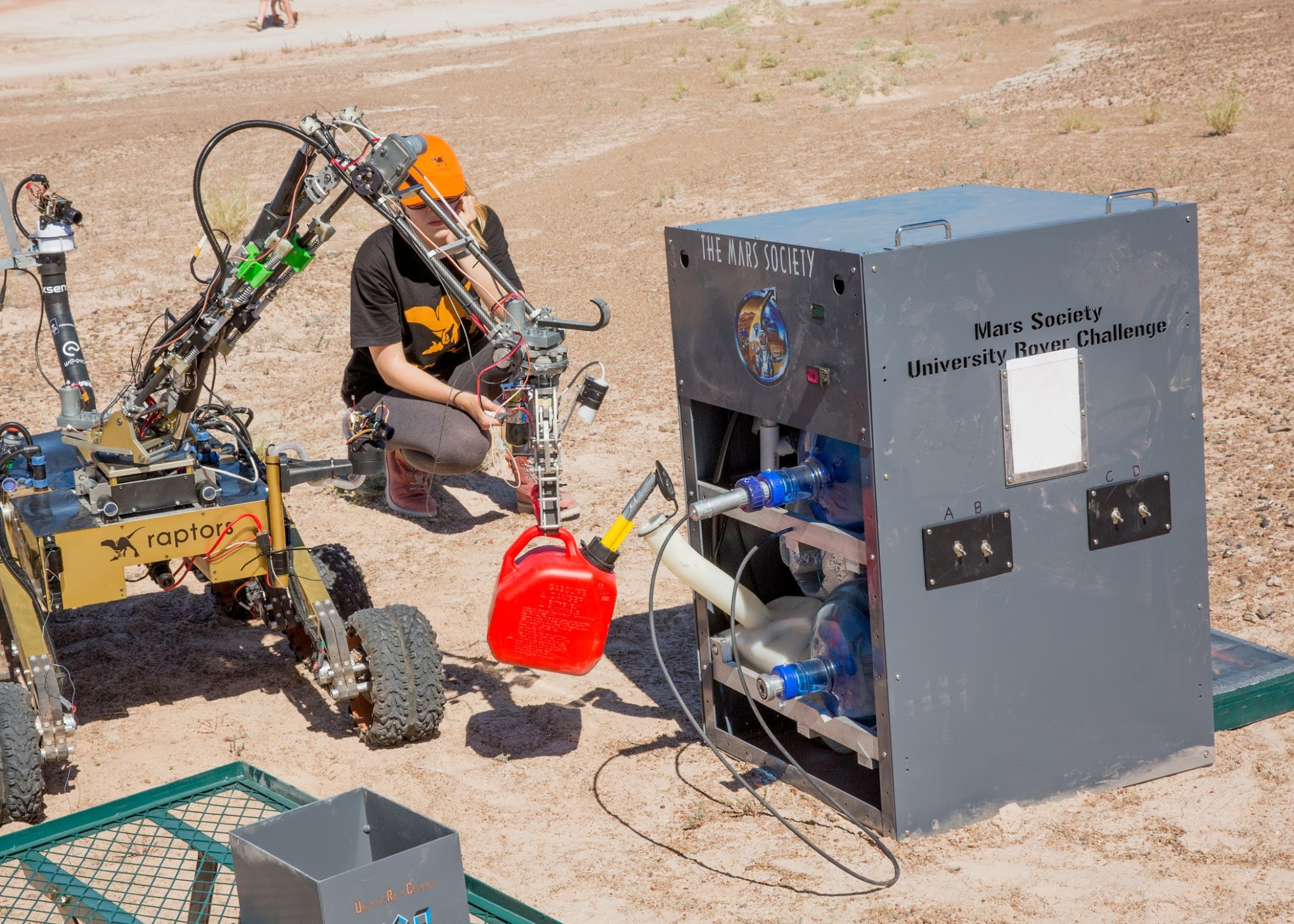
Rover pours fuel into a generator in Mars Society University Rover Challenge

== Tasks (2019) ==
Specific scenario details change each year as teams master given tasks and to encourage flexibility in designs and improve the capabilities of the rovers each year. Rovers are required to perform tele-operated or autonomous tasks that would assist astronauts in the field. Tele-operated tasks are performed from control stations with no direct view of the rover, only what can be determined via video and data links from the rover or sensors deployed by the rover. It is assumed the operators are also on Mars so there is no time-delay in communications. For 2019 tasks include:

=== System Acceptance Review (SAR) ===
Teams must submit a written report and a short video describing and demonstrating the design and capabilities of the rover to perform the required tasks, scientific plan, and team management.

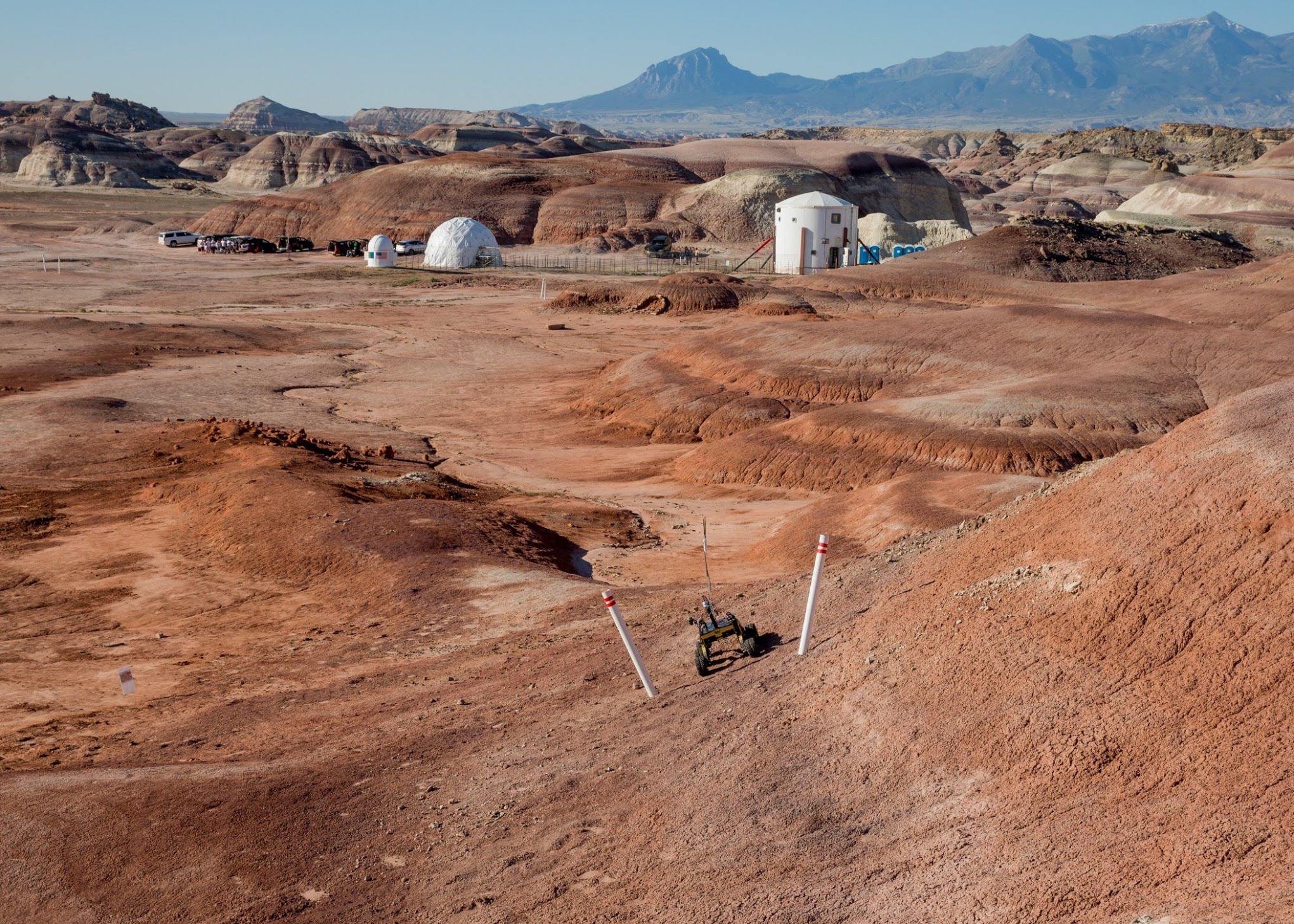
Rover climbs hill above Mars Desert Research Station in Mars Society University Rover Challenge

=== Science Mission ===
"The goal is to conduct in-situ analysis with the rover, including life detection testing of samples"

Teams must investigate multiple sites of biological interest, using instruments and methods of their choice, where they must conduct analysis of samples entirely on board the rover. The goal of the task is to determine the presence or absence of life, either extinct or extant, at designated sites. After the 20–30 minutes of investigation time, teams must also prepare a short presentation to give to the judges on-site, which presents their results, analysis, and conclusions. Analysis is expected to be relevant to the setting on Earth while demonstrating an understanding of how these observations would translate to a Martian setting.

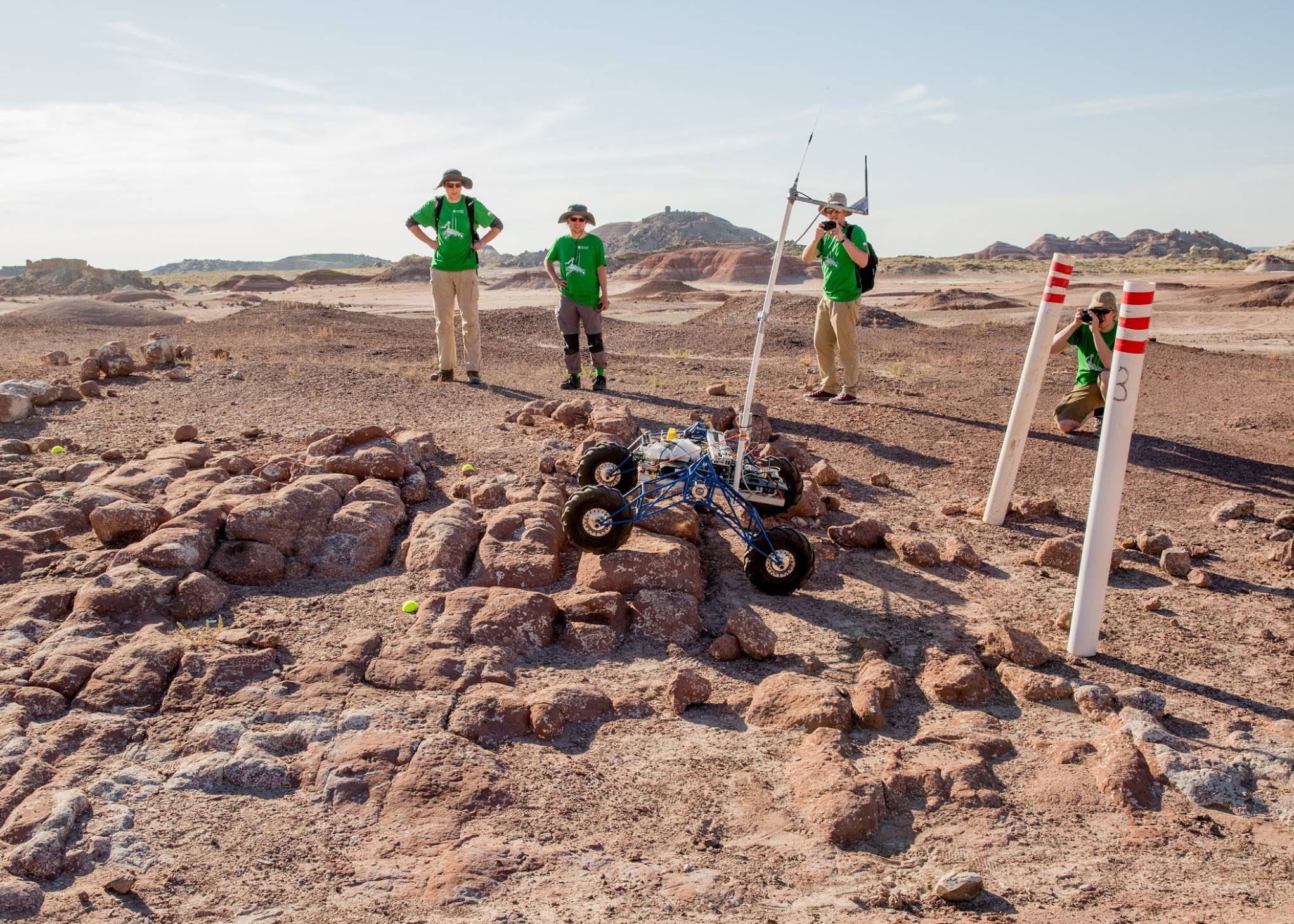
Rover traverses rock garden in Mars Society University Rover Challenge

=== Extreme Retrieval and Delivery Mission ===
"rovers shall be required to pick up and deliver objects in the field, and deliver assistance to astronauts"

Rovers must pick up and deliver objects in the field, such as screwdrivers, hammers, toolboxes, rocks, etc. Rovers are required to traverse a wide variety of terrain—anything from soft sandy areas, to rock and boulder fields, to vertical drops. Teams are given approximate GPS coordinates for each pickup and delivery location, and potentially specific instructions for particular objects. Scoring is based on teams' ability to pick up and deliver objects to their correct locations.

=== Equipment Servicing Mission ===
"Rovers shall be required to perform several dexterous operations on a mock-up equipment system."

Possible operations outlined in the rules for 2019 include:

- Operate a joystick, push buttons, flip switches, turn knobs
- Tighten captive screw to secure drawer
- Replace an electronics board using a rugged board-to-board connector
- Turn a hand crank

2017 required rovers to tow a wagon carrying a fuel canister to a generator, fill up the fuel tank, swap the regulator on gas cylinders, and start the generator by pressing a button. Previous equipment tasks have included pumping air into an inflatable habitat, and cleaning solar panels.

=== Autonomous Travel Mission ===
"Rovers shall be required to autonomously traverse between markers in this staged mission across moderately difficult terrain."

Here, autonomous means without teleoperation—that is, without operators from the base station giving commands or user input. The rover must do all its decision-making on board. However, teleoperated scouting is allowed in the earlier stages.

The markers in this task are tennis balls and approximate GPS coordinates given to teams. As the stages get more difficult, the GPS coordinates will become increasingly vague and there will be more obstacles between the tennis balls, requiring obstacle avoidance and autonomous route finding. In addition, teleoperated scouting is allowed in the earlier stages, but not in the later ones.

== Rules and Regulations (2019) ==
=== Rover Rules ===
- Rovers must not exceed 50 kg in any one configuration
- Rovers must fit within a 1.2 meter by 1.2 meter footprint
- Rovers must have a total cost not exceeding $18,000
- Rovers must use power and propulsion systems that are applicable to operations on Mars (e.g. no air-breathing systems)
- Use of airborne vehicles is prohibited

=== Operation Rules ===
- Teams will operate their rovers in real time from designated command and control stations.
- Rovers are not expected to travel more than 1 km from the base station
- Nobody may follow alongside the rover for the purpose of providing feedback to the operators, though members of the judging team, media, non-operator team members, and other spectators may follow a rover at the judges' discretion.

=== Team Rules ===
- There is no restriction on the number of team members or operators allowed.
- Team members may be undergraduate or graduate students and teams are permitted to include high school students as well
- Students must be enrolled in at least a half time degree or high school diploma granting course.
- Students from multiple universities may compete on the same team, and a single university may field multiple teams, as long as there is no overlap between team members, budget, or equipment.

== Judging ==
A panel of judges conducts the judging, and this panel changes from year to year. Some effort is made to have a diversity of experience on the judging team, and past judges have included persons with professional experience as: systems engineers, biologists, roboticists, industrial designers, scientists and professors of varied fields. Judges are volunteers.

== Funding ==
Teams raise the money for the rovers themselves, through their university and/or outside sponsors. The competition itself is funded in part by the Mars Society, Protocase Inc, (a custom parts manufacturer, which offers teams credit and discounts for all parts manufactured at Protocase), Honeybee Robotics, and Microsoft.

== See also ==
- Colonization of Mars
- Exploration of Mars
- Haughton-Mars Project
- Life on Mars
- Human mission to Mars
- MARS-500
- Mars Desert Research Station
- Mars Direct
- Mars to Stay
- Space colonization
