= Mars Desert Research Station =

Longest-running Mars analog habitat

Coordinates: 38°24′23.25″N 110°47′30.85″W

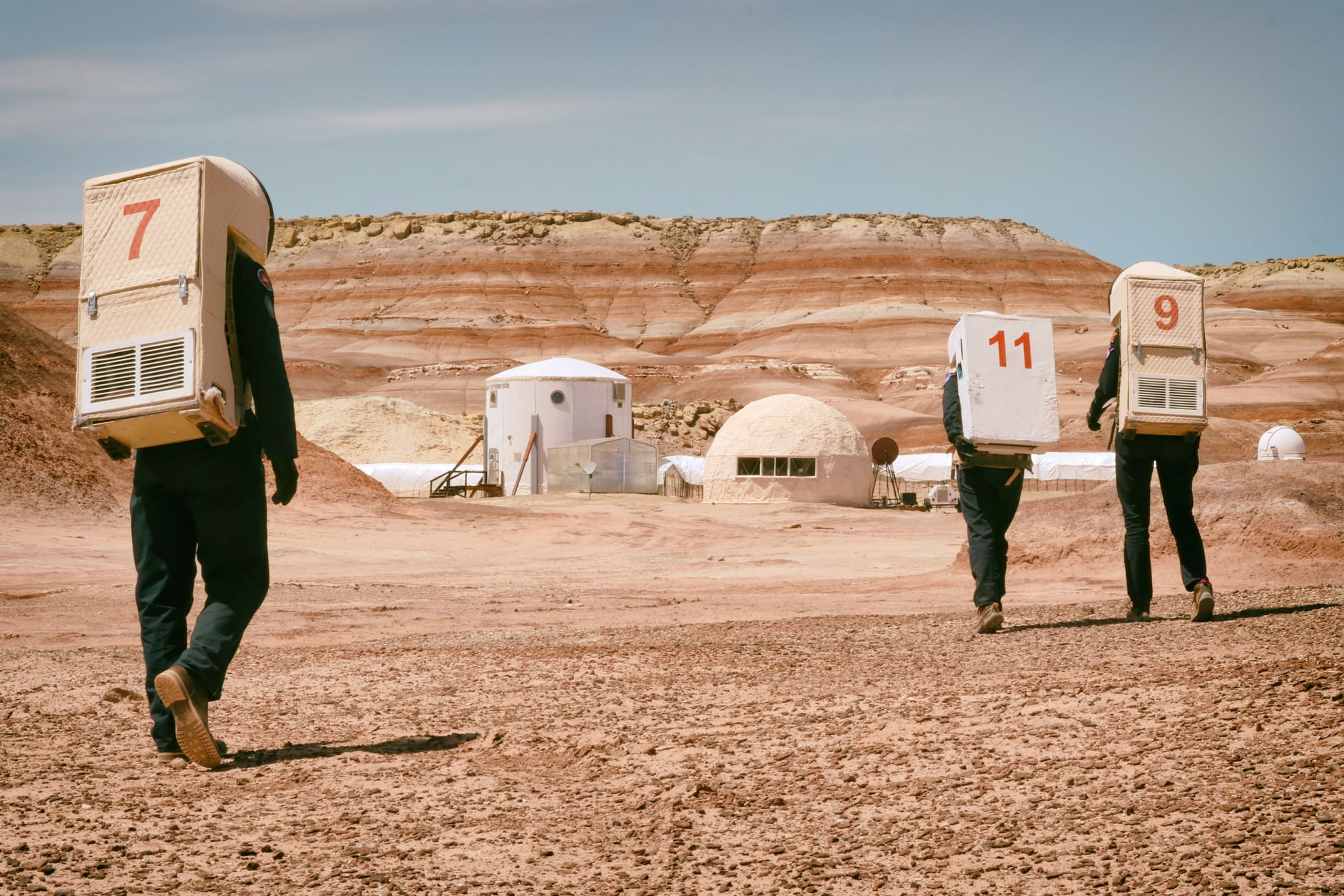
The Mars Society's Mars Desert Research Station located near Hanksville, Utah

The Mars Desert Research Station (MDRS) is the largest and longest-running Mars surface research facility and is one of two simulated Mars analog habitats owned and operated by the Mars Society.

The MDRS station was built in the early 2000s near Hanksville, Utah, in the western United States. It is crewed by small teams who conduct scientific research.

The MDRS campus includes a two-story habitat with a greenhouse, a solar and a robotic observatory, an engineering pod and a science building.

== Background ==
The MDRS station is situated on the San Rafael Swell of Southern Utah, 11.63 kilometres (7.23 mi) by road northwest of Hanksville, Utah. It is the second such analogue research station to be built by the Mars Society, following the Flashline Mars Arctic Research Station or FMARS on Devon Island in Canada's high Arctic.

The Mars Society launched the Mars Analog Research Station Project with the stated goal of developing knowledge needed to prepare for the human exploration of Mars. The project's goals are to develop field tactics based on environmental constraints (i.e., being required to work in spacesuits), test habitat design features and tools, and assess crew selection protocols. Although much warmer than Mars, the desert location was selected because of its Mars-like terrain and appearance.

The MDRS aims to realistically simulate Mars living conditions. During mission periods, crew members must wear an analogue space suit simulator when completing tasks outside their living quarters, which is a metal building with an airlock. Analogue space suit simulators include a helmet, jumpsuit, boots, gaiters, gloves, an air supply pack, water pack, and a radio. Hand-held radios mounted on the suits' helmets with externally mounted push-to-talk northeast switches are used to communicate with the habitat and with fellow Mars surface explorers on the same extra-vehicular activity.

Destinations for extra-vehicular activities can be chosen from an established way-point database, and attained either on foot, or by all-terrain vehicle.

MDRS is owned and operated by the Mars Society, which selects the crews and handles most of the administrative tasks. The Mars Society is an international, non-profit organization that works with governments to promote Mars exploration through various projects such as M.A.R.S., the Mars Analogue Pressurized Rover Competition, and the ARCHIMEDES Mars balloon mission.

The MDRS hosts a training program funded by NASA which hosts teachers to participate in projects meant to simulate the living environment on the moon or Mars. In this program, participants conduct field research and live onsite for several weeks.

== Research ==
Each crew establishes different scientific goals they hope to accomplish during their time at MDRS. The majority of biological research involves extremophiles. Bacteria and algae isolated from the surrounding desert are common subjects of study. These microorganisms have been studied for their DNA, their diversity, and the environments in which they thrive. For example, in a study for methanogens, researchers studied soil and vapor samples from five different desert environments in Utah, Idaho, and California in the United States, Canada, and Chile. Of these, five soil samples and three vapor samples from the vicinity of the MDRS were found to have signs of viable methanogens.

Crews often study endoliths found in rocks at the MDRS. These species of bacteria are capable of living inside rocks and obtaining the energy they need by photosynthesizing the light that penetrates the rocks. These extreme organisms are a popular subject of research at MDRS for both geologists and biologists.

Other experiments include a study of the effect of extra-vehicular activity on the heart rates and blood pressures of crew members, a human-factors study that examines the correlation between cognitive ability and mood, and a study on how much a space suit inhibits dexterity in comparison to regular street clothes.

== Crews ==
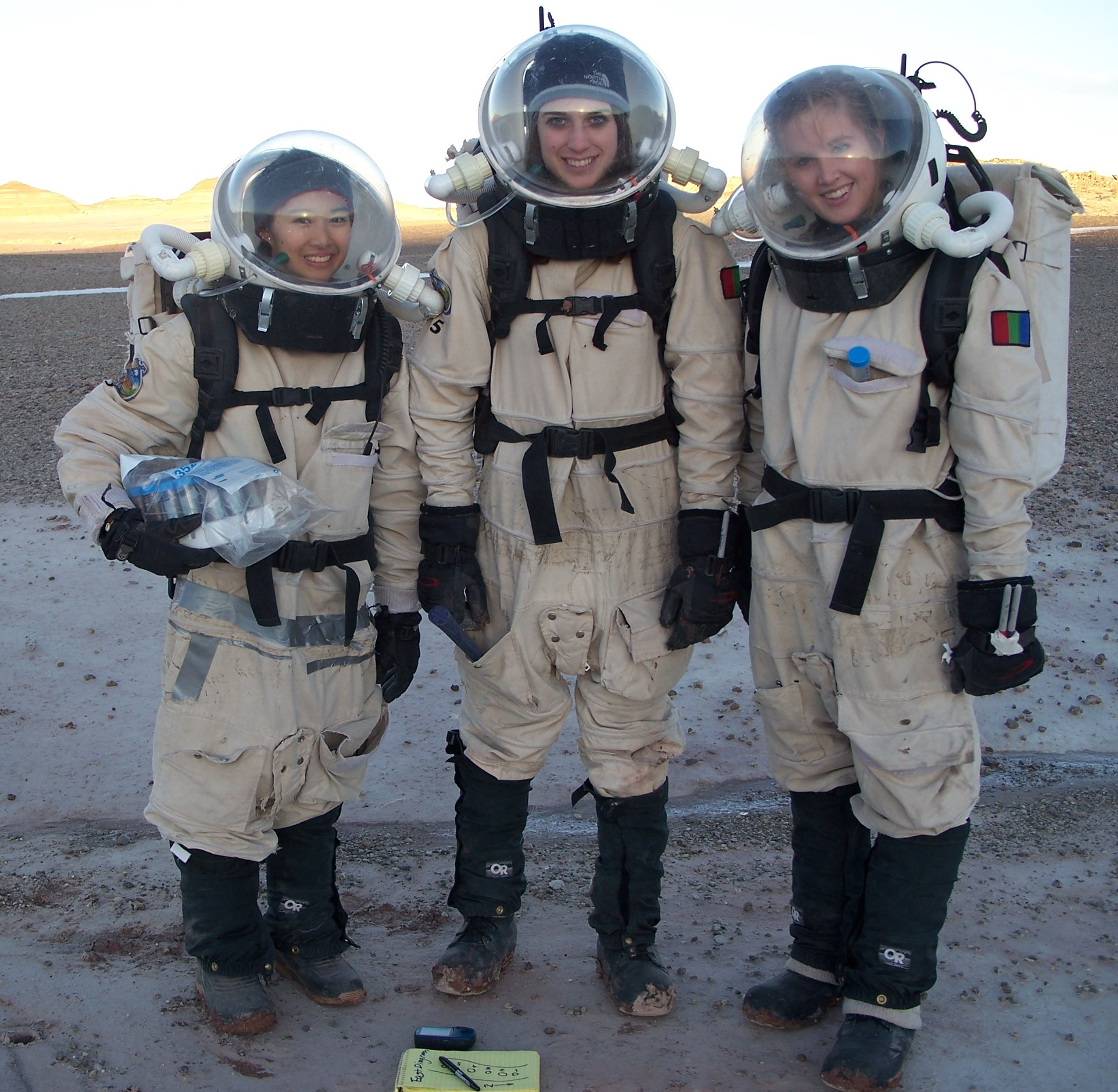
Crew 73 members in Space Suit Simulators

MDRS crews traditionally consist of six people who volunteer for one of the two-week shifts or crew rotations available during the northern hemisphere's winter months. The field season ends in the northern spring due to the desert heat. Crews pay their own transportation expenses to and from the designated assembly place from where they are transported to and from MDRS. As volunteers, the crews are not paid for their participation in a crew rotation at the station. The crews usually consist of a mix of scientists, astronomers, physicists, biologists, geologists, engineers, and the occasional journalist. Each crew member is usually assigned a role, such as: commander, executive officer, health and safety officer, crew biologist, crew geologist or chief engineer.

Crew commanders are responsible for the entire crew and operations. Their responsibilities include maintaining a structured stream of information from the crew to mission support, establishing the agenda for each day (extra-vehicular activities, maintenance, cooking, cleaning, etc.), and holding morning and evening meetings with all crew members. The executive officer's duty is to act as the second in command during the mission, and to act as the commander in the event the commander is incapacitated or unavailable. The crew geologist and crew biologist work together to establish and accomplish the scientific goals of the mission, which include developing the geology and biology goals for the mission as well as planning field extra-vehicular activities and subsequent laboratory work to achieve those goals. Both the crew geologist and crew biologist work with the remote science team (RST) during all stages of the mission. The Chief Engineer is responsible for maintaining all systems necessary for routine Habitat operations. These include the power, water, ATV and GreenHab systems.

As of February 2017, 175 crews have served rotations at MDRS over a period of sixteen years.

== The station ==
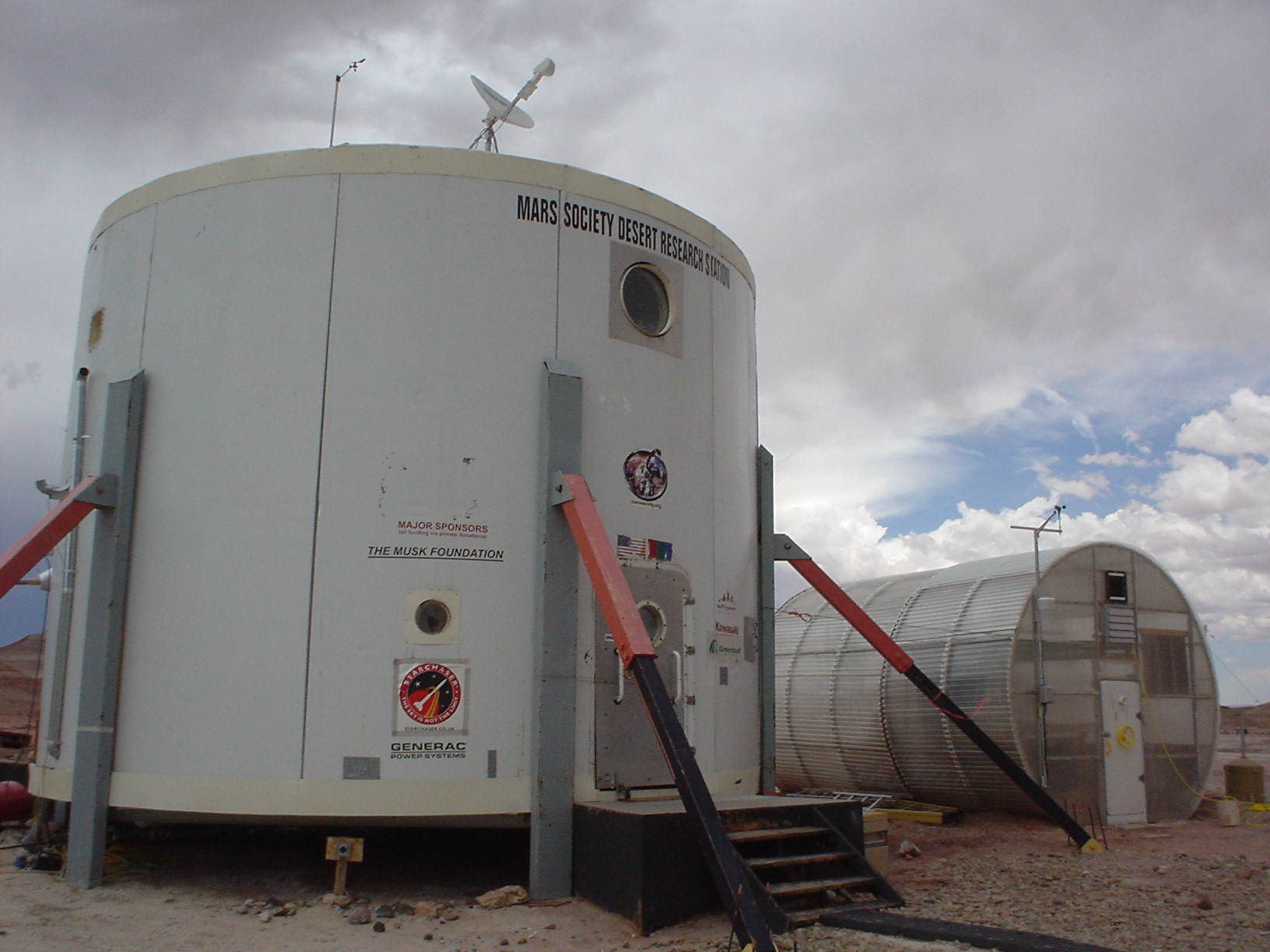
MDRS

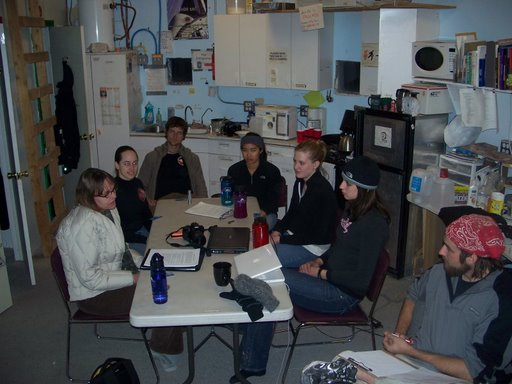
Crew 73 meets with writer Laurie Schmidt upstairs in the Hab.

Both FMARS and MDRS originally have the same basic design: a two-level habitat module 8 m (26 ft) in diameter. The habitat's lower level has a bathroom, laboratory, two airlocks, an extravehicular activity preparation area and stores various engineering equipment; at the top, the habitat's upper level has six sleeping quarters for each crew, a common area, computing area and galley (kitchen). The loft level above the sleeping quarter is used for storage. Later on, there were drastic differences between the FMARS and MDRS, due to FMARS's more isolated location and MDRS's more continuous use, maintenance and expansion.

The MDRS is expanded from the two-level habitat (called Hab) to include a greenhouse (GreenHab), solar observatory (Musk Observatory), a science building (Science Dome), an engineering pod (RAM), and a robotic observatory. The Musk Observatory is named after Elon Musk, who donated $100,000 to the MDRS.

Except for the robotic observatory, the modules are connected via tunnels. At the habitat, the lower deck is used for science and engineering activities. Like the FMARS, it has a shower and toilet, a biology and geology laboratory, two simulated airlocks, an extravehicular activity preparation area, and storage space. The upper deck is used for social activities, dining and communications, and has seven separate crew quarters. In the loft area, a tank stores freshwater and a hatch is used for maintaining antenna and weather instruments. Water for flushing the toilet is provided by the greenhouse, and electricity is provided by batteries under the habitat.

=== Habitat ===
The analogue Mars Lander Habitat is a two-story cylinder that measures about 10 metres (33 ft) in diameter, and is a crew's combined home and place of work during a Mars surface exploration simulation. On the first floor, are two simulated airlocks, a shower and toilet, an extra-vehicular activity preparation room for storage and maintenance of the simulated space suits and their associated equipment, and a combined science lab and engineering work area. The laboratory is shared between the crew geologist and the crew biologist and includes an autoclave, analytical balance, microscope, and a stock of chemicals and reagents for conducting biochemical tests.

On the second floor are six very small private crew staterooms with bunks and a small reading desk, a common dining and entertainment area, a dedicated communications station and a galley or kitchen equipped with a gas stove, refrigerator, microwave, oven and a sink for meal preparations. Above the six crew staterooms is a Loft which contains the internal freshwater storage tank and equipment storage space. At the peak of the HAB's dome-shaped roof is an access hatch to permit maintenance access to the satellite antenna and weather monitoring instruments.

Power is supplied by 12 rechargeable 24-volt batteries located under the Hab which can provide electrical power for up to twelve hours. In addition to the batteries are two 5 kilowatts (6.7 hp) electricity generators. Power from the generators is channeled through an inverter, which sends the power either to the battery banks to recharge them or via a panel with 19 circuit breakers, to the HAB electrical distribution system.

Water is supplied to the Hab via a potable water tank located 100 feet (30 m) away in the Engineering Support Equipment Area. The tank is a plastic storage container with a 450-U.S.-gallon (1,700 L; 370 imp gal) capacity (8 days worth of water at 6 U.S. gallons (23 L; 5.0 imp gal) per person per day). Water must be manually carried or pumped via a hose from the potable water tank to the HAB's internal tank, which holds about 60 U.S. gallons (230 L; 50 imp gal). The water is then gravity fed into a pressure pump that distributes the freshwater to the rest of the HAB, including a water heater. The water used to flush toilets is greywater. This is wastewater that has run down the sink and shower drains in the HAB and then through the greywater system out of the GreenHab. Water is rationed and monitored to minimize inefficiency and waste in the system.

The Hab is also equipped with an internet connection and several webcams so that the public can view the ongoing mission.

=== GreenHab ===
The GreenHab is a greenhouse used for growing crops and plant research. The original Gary Fisher GreenHab, retrofitted in 2009 from a closed loop water recycling center to a functional greenhouse, was destroyed by fire in December 2014, and replaced in September 2015 after an Indiegogo campaign raised $12,540 to rebuild it.

Originally the rebuilt GreenHab was planned as a geodesic dome, however, once the pad and frame were in place, it could not be made wind and winter-tight, so it was completed as the new Science Dome. The new Greenhab is a 12-foot by 24 foot transparent building that is climate and light controlled. Plants grown in the GreenHab are mostly herbs, greens, radishes, tomatoes, and other vegetables.

=== Musk Mars Desert Observatory ===
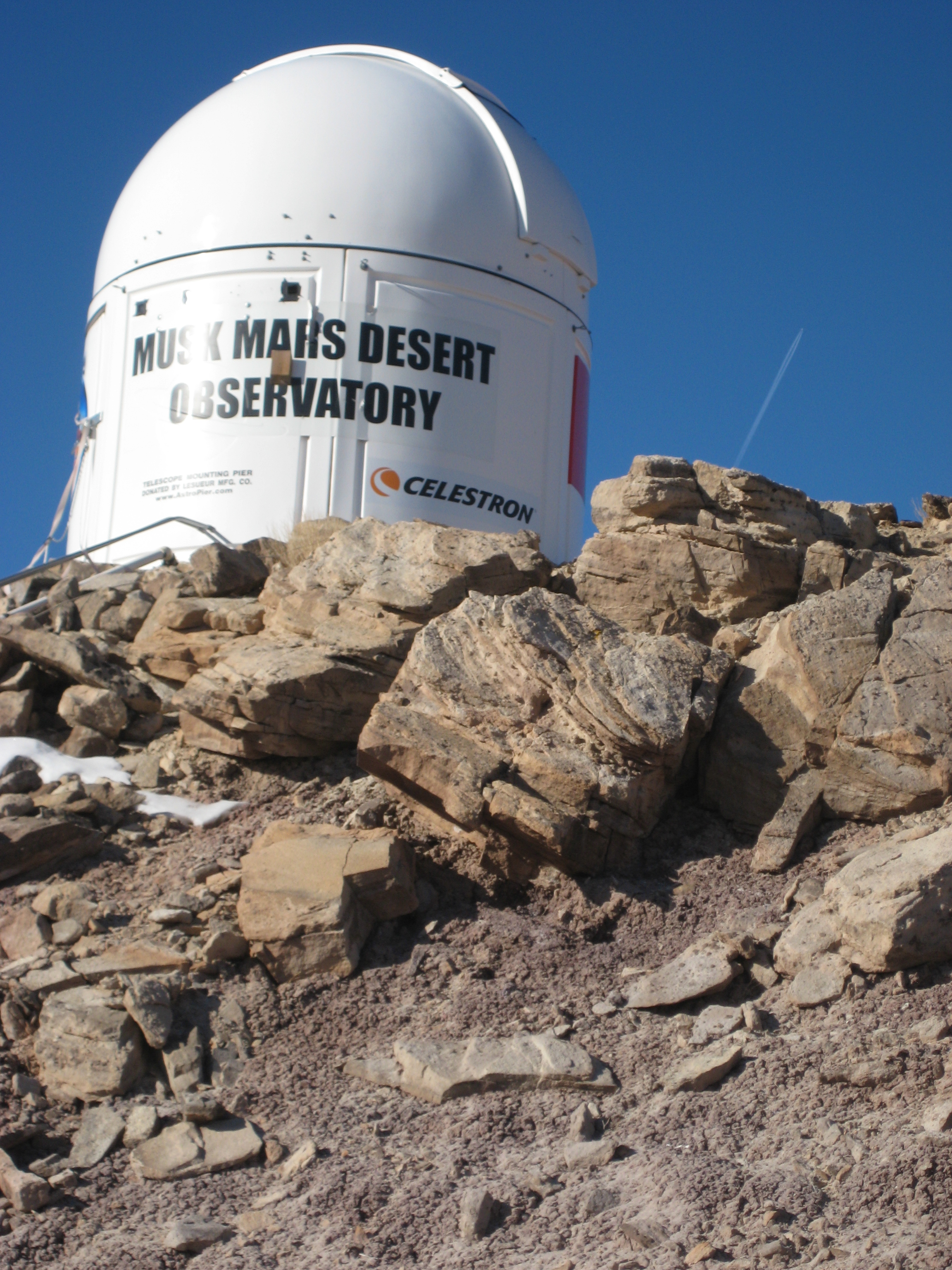
The Musk Mars Desert Observatory

The Musk Mars Desert Observatory houses a 28-centimetre (11 in) Schmidt-Cassegrain telescope, donated by Celestron. The telescope is capable of being operated remotely, and is accessible to amateur and professional astronomers via the internet. The observatory's other sponsors include Le Sueur Manufacturing Inc., which provided the Astro-Pier on which the telescope is mounted; Software Bisque, which provided TheSky software; Vince Lanzetta of East Coast Observatories; Adirondack Video Astronomy; High Point Scientific; Technical Innovations; and the Lehigh Valley Amateur Astronomical Association.

The addition of the Musk Mars Desert Observatory provides research opportunities that were not available before, to the crew and local teachers and students. Students and teachers are invited to interact with the crew and to use the observatory as a learning tool.

Engineering tasks are completed in the repair and assembly module, a retrofitted Chinook helicopter fuel compartment designed for tool storage, and work spaces for engineering projects and repair of station instruments. It was moved to the campus in October 2017 and became fully operational in November 2018.

=== Other ===
North of the GreenHab is the underground septic tank and its outflow field. This area is a "No Drive – Foot Traffic Only Zone" as there is no record of where exactly the septic tank is buried. East of the GreenHab is an omnidirectional Jovian radio telescope.

MDRS is the site of the annual University Rover Challenge, the first of which was held on June 2, 2007.

The flag of Mars appears on a couple of the buildings, as does the flag of the United States.

== See also ==
- BYU Mars Rover
- Colonization of Mars
- Exploration of Mars
- Flag of Mars
- Flashline Mars Arctic Research Station
- Haughton-Mars Project
- Human mission to Mars
- Life on Mars
- MARS-500
- Mars Direct
- Mars to Stay
- Moon Society
- Space colonization
- Space science
- Timekeeping on Mars
- NASA Exploration Atmosphere Tests
- Space Analog for the Moon and Mars
- Scientific International Research in Unique Terrestrial Station
