= Hanna Harutyunyan =

First Armenian astronaut

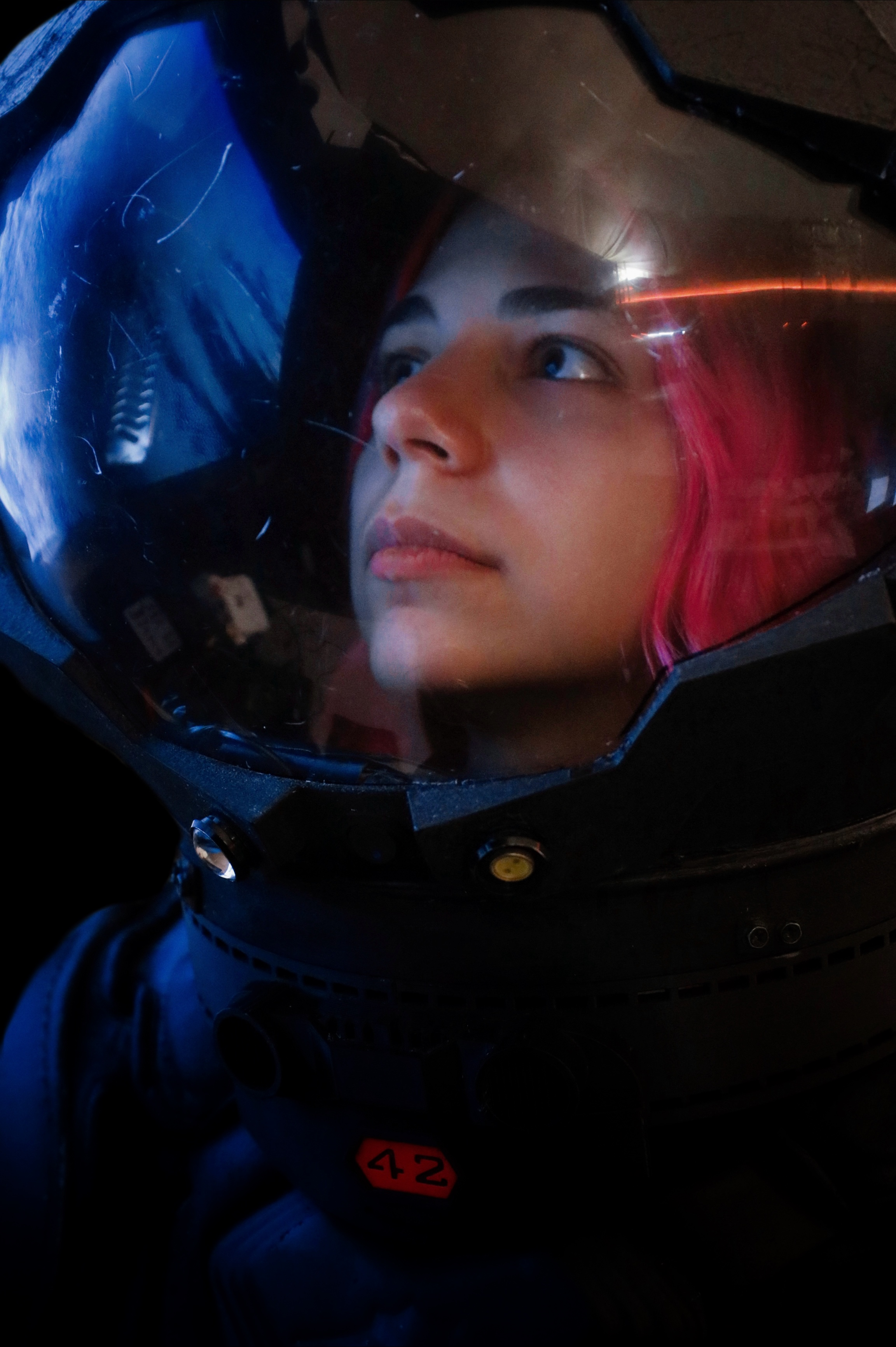
- Official portrait, 2025
- Education: Robotics Engineering
- Occupation: Analog Astronaut
- Known for: First Armenian Analog Astronaut
- Website: Mission Analog Podcast

Hanna Harutyunyan (also known as Anna Harutyunyan) is the first Armenian analog astronaut, a robotics engineer, and science communicator. She has participated in numerous simulated space missions across multiple countries and contributes to research in human factors, robotics, and astronaut cognitive performance.

Her notable deployments include the AMADEE-24 Mars analog mission conducted by the Austrian Space Forum, the LOTOS mission by the Analog Astronaut Training Center (AATC), and the Asclepios V and VI missions in Switzerland. Most recently, she represented Armenia as a crew engineer during the Terra Nova analog mission at the LunAres Research Station in Piła, Poland — a high-fidelity mirror simulation of the real ISS Axiom-4 (Ax-4) mission, conducted under the European Space Agency (ESA)-funded Astro Mental Health project.

== Early life and education ==
Harutyunyan developed an early interest in engineering, robotics, and space science, a passion she has traced to childhood inspirations such as the character Buzz Lightyear from the animated film Toy Story. Before beginning her formal university studies, she was active in Armenia's technology community, organizing tech events, teaching programming, and creating educational tutorials.

She subsequently pursued a degree in robotics engineering and expanded her training internationally, participating in programs such as the NASA L'Space Academy.

== Analog astronaut career ==
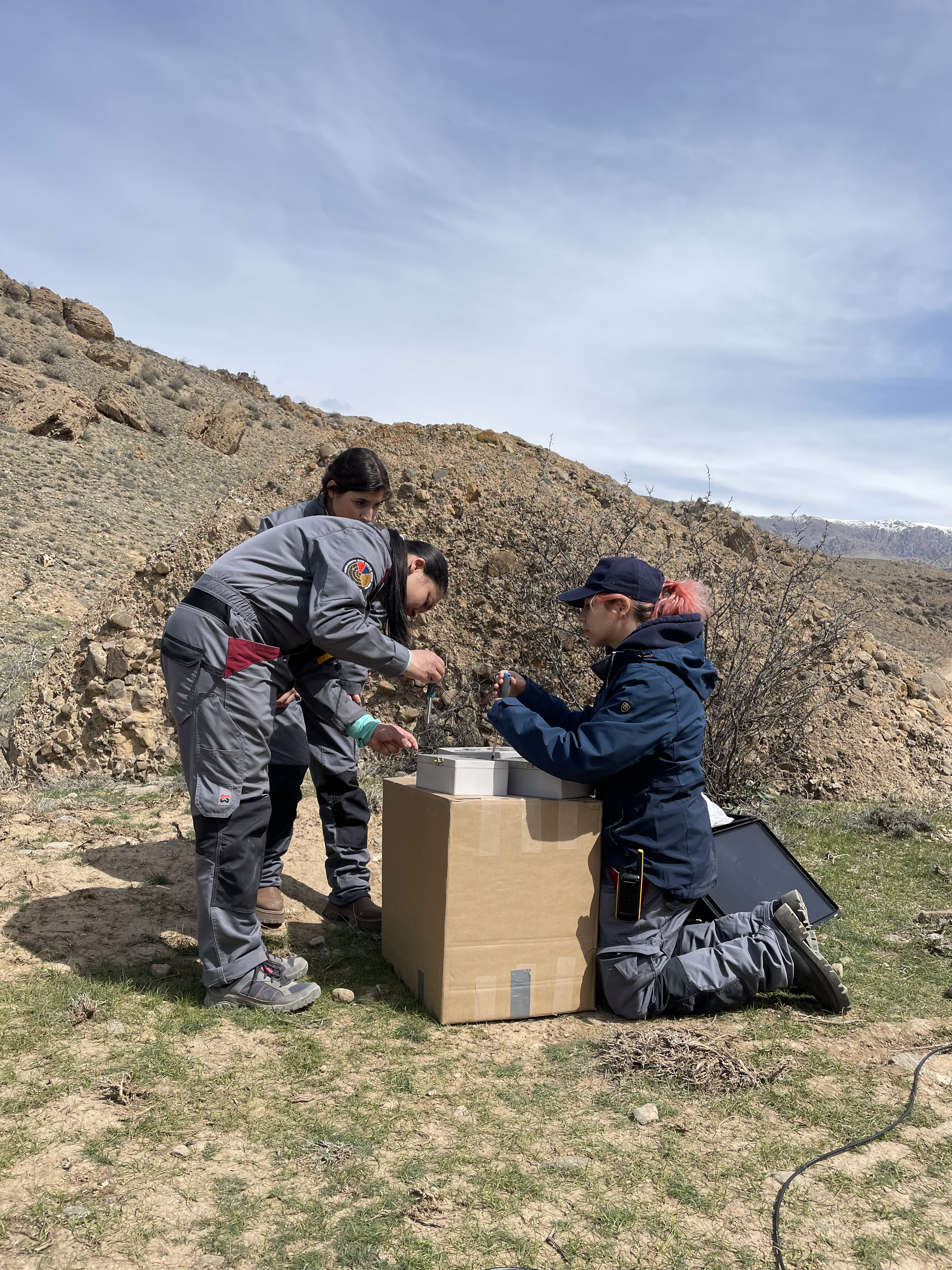
Harutyunyan and GOST team members setting up field equipment during the AMADEE-24 analog mission.

Analog space missions are ground-based simulations designed to replicate the isolation, confinement, and operational pressures of human spaceflight. Harutyunyan has participated in several such missions, using them as platforms for research in crew dynamics, human factors, and cognitive performance.

=== AMADEE-24 ===
Harutyunyan served as a Ground Operation Support (GOST) team member for the AMADEE-24 Mars analog mission, conducted by the Austrian Space Forum in Armenia. The mission focused on testing equipment and operational workflows relevant to future planetary surface exploration.

=== LOTOS ===
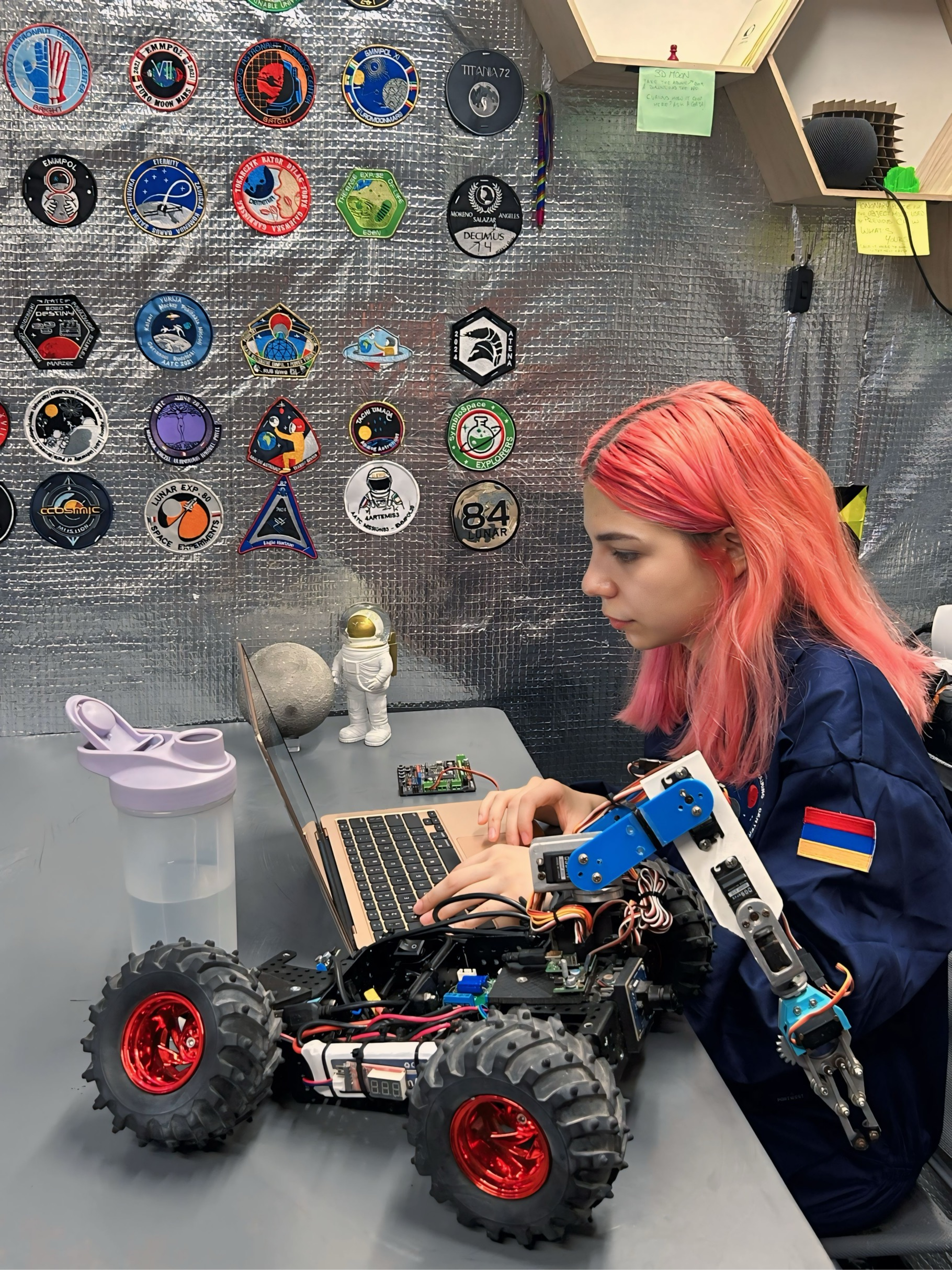
Harutyunyan operating a robotic rover inside the habitat during the all-female LOTOS analog mission in 2024.

Harutyunyan participated as an Analog Astronaut and Mission Engineer in the all-female LOTOS mission, organised by the Analog Astronaut Training Center (AATC) in Poland. The mission emphasised crew coordination and mission operations in a confined habitat environment.

=== Terra Nova ===
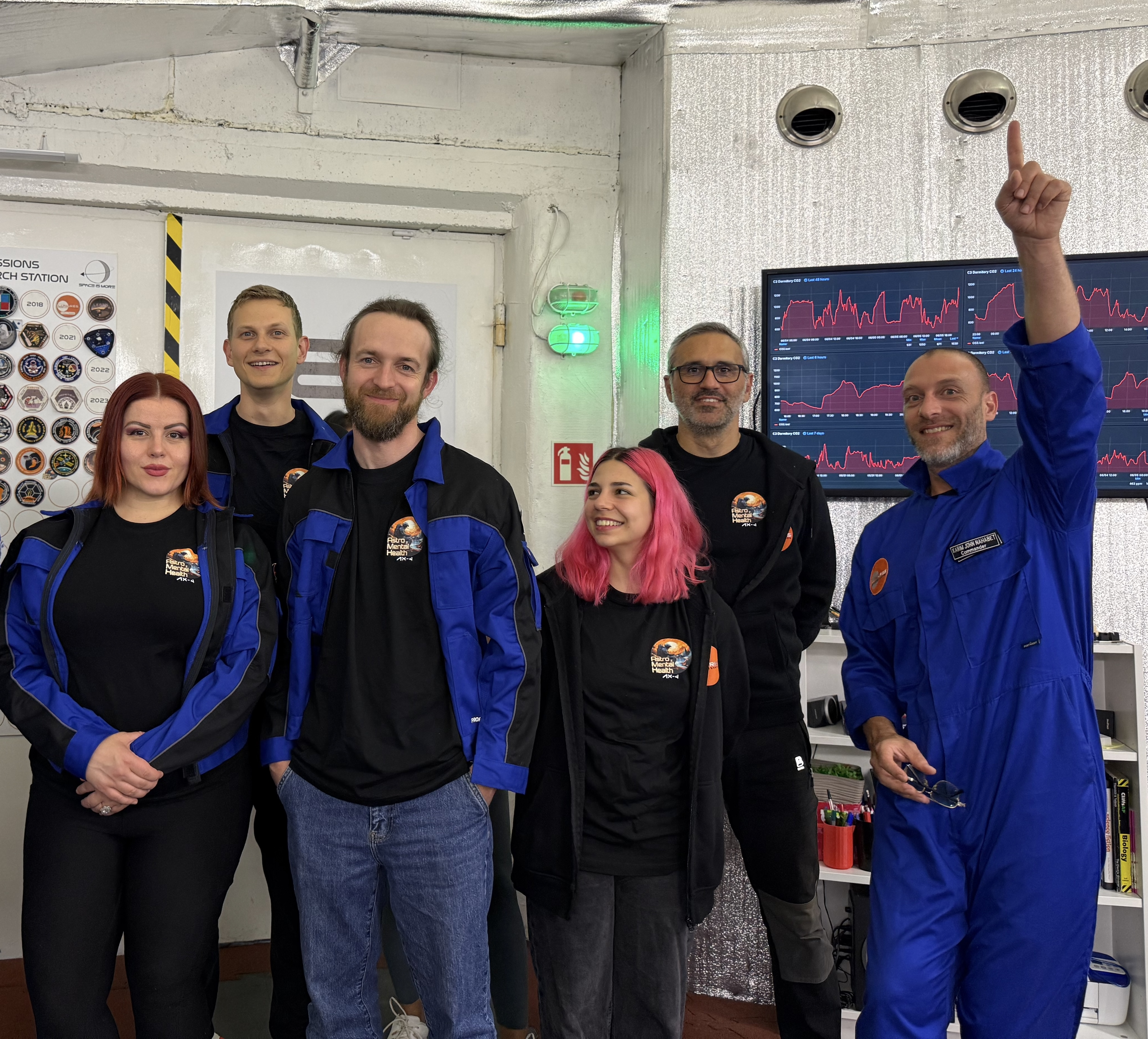
Official crew portrait for the Terra Nova analog mission. From left: Martina Dimsoka, Josh Kivijärv, Marcin Drobik, Hanna Harutyunyan, Pedro Pedroso, Karim Nahabet.

Harutyunyan served as Crew Engineer during the Terra Nova mission at the LunAres Research Station in Piła, Poland. The mission operated as a real-time, synchronized mirror simulation of the ISS Axiom-4 spaceflight and was funded under the ESA's Astro Mental Health project. The crew lived in complete habitat isolation to allow parallel study of psychological and operational dynamics alongside the actual astronauts aboard the ISS.

=== Asclepios V and VI ===
During her two lunar analog missions with the Asclepios Project in Airolo, Switzerland, Harutyunyan served as Astronaut Training Officer. Her work in this role centered on helping to develop specialized training modules for the crew, including zero-gravity flights, avalanche survival, and firefighting training, while also implementing protocols to track and boost the astronauts' cognitive performance throughout prolonged periods of deep isolation.

== Missions ==
The following table summarises Harutyunyan's analog space mission deployments and operational support roles:

Analog mission record
Mission name	Year	Role	Organising body	Location
AMADEE-24	2024	Ground Operation Support (GOST)	Austrian Space Forum	Armenia
LOTOS	2024	Mission Engineer	Analog Astronaut Training Center (AATC)	Poland
Asclepios V	2024 – 2025	Astronaut Training Officer	Asclepios Project	Airolo, Switzerland
Terra Nova (Ax-4 Mirror)	2025	Crew Engineer	LunAres Research Station / ESA	Piła, Poland
Asclepios VI	2025 – now	Astronaut Training Officer	Asclepios Project	Airolo, Switzerland

== Engineering research ==
Harutyunyan's technical research centres on Mars rover design and autonomous robotics. Alongside this, she conducts mental mathematics research aimed at developing practical tools to monitor and sustain astronaut cognitive performance during long-duration isolation — research she applies directly within her analog missions.

Her conceptual mission work includes AMIDE (Alba Mons Ice-Rich Deposits Exploration), a proposed initiative to investigate potential subsurface ice deposits and past habitable environments on the north-facing slopes of the Alba Mons region on Mars.

== Science communication ==
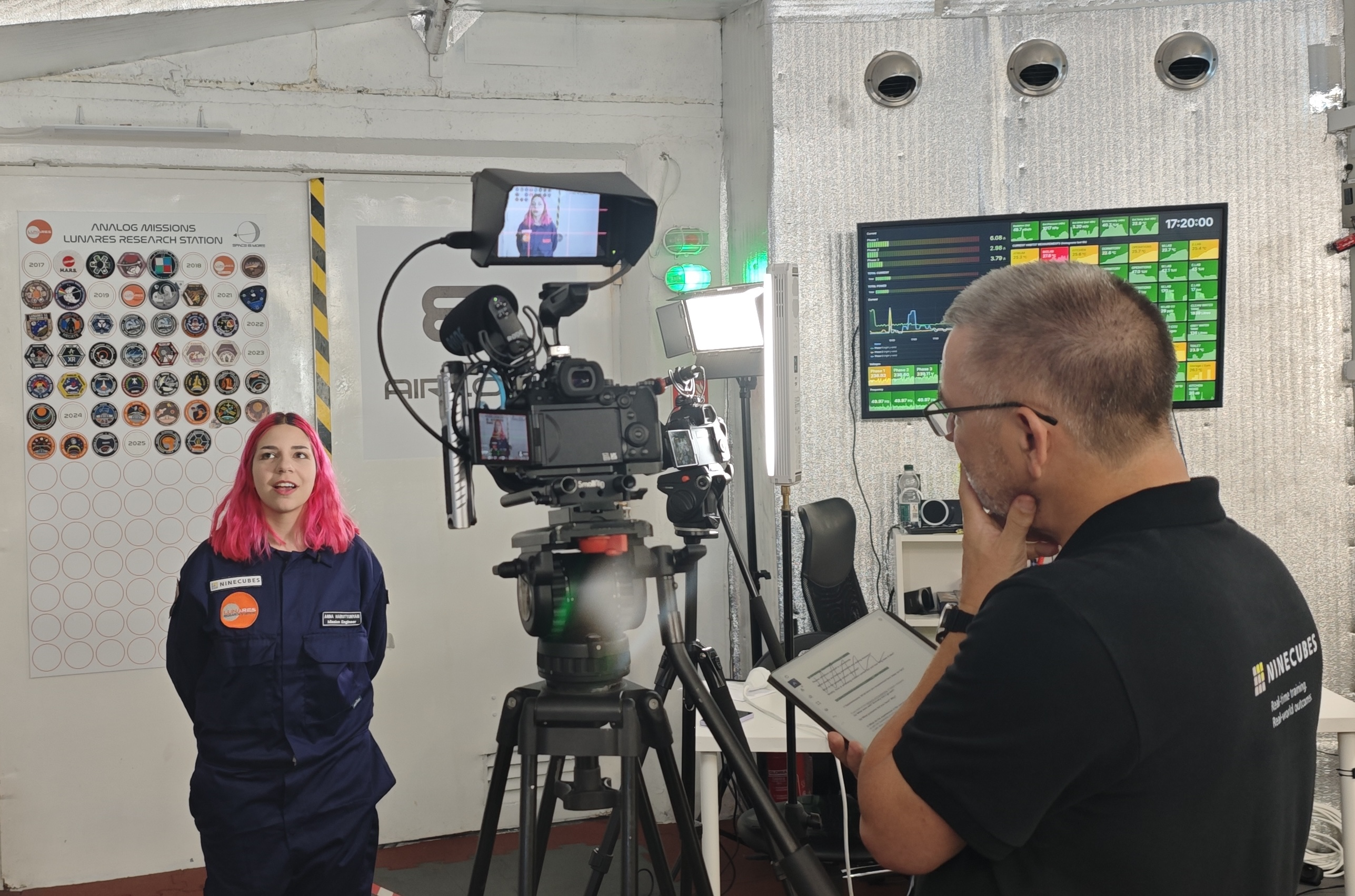
Harutyunyan during a media interview discussing Interpersonal Skills Lab training for Ninecubes.

Harutyunyan is a proponent of STEM education and space outreach, regularly appearing on international podcasts and Armenian national television to discuss space missions and robotics. She has been featured on The Casual Space Podcast, Bats Podcast, The Airlock Module Podcast, and the Nzhar Podcast.

She is the creator and host of Mission: Analog, a podcast dedicated to analog space exploration that features interviews with professionals across the space industry. She also speaks at international space and technology conferences, and works with organisations to develop platforms for training future analog astronauts in Armenia.

== Recognition ==
Harutyunyan's work has been covered by international media and organisations, representing a landmark for Armenian participation in global space exploration research. Her analog mission contributions have been highlighted across professional platforms, including a photography feature in Vogue.

== See also ==
- Human analog mission
- Mars analog habitat
- Human spaceflight
- Women in space
- Axiom Mission 4
