= Human analog mission =

Activities undertaken on Earth to simulate human space missions

Human analog missions are activities undertaken on Earth in various environments to simulate aspects of human space missions to other worlds, including the Moon, asteroids, and Mars. These remote field tests are performed in locations that are identified based on their physical similarities to the extreme space environments of a target mission. Such activities are undertaken to test hardware and operational concepts in relevant environments. Some of the highest regarded analogs take place in remote locations such as the arctic and even underwater.

No analog on Earth can truly simulate all aspects of a human space mission. Instead, a wide array of analog activities are necessary, each testing only a few important concepts and/or hardware elements at a time.

== Analog activities ==
- Analog Astronaut Training Center (AATC) – organization with two full-isolation research laboratories (habitats) and an analog astronaut training program with international internship certification. As of March 2026, there was 105 analog missions, 1 large-scale analog colony (31 participants), 37 peer-reviewed publications, 145 conference proceedings, 4 PhD researches, 15 MS studies, 46 BS studies. AATC specializes in human physiology research and operational trainings for scientists, engineers, and astronaut candidates. AATC is founded by two former European Space Agency professionals: an engineer (Matt Harasymczuk) and a scientist (Agata Kolodziejczyk). Both research facilities are located in the south-eastern part of Poland. Besides scientific projects, co-supervision of engineer, bachelor, masters and doctoral theses, AATC organizes rocket workshops, stratospheric missions, recreational and technical scuba diving trainings, and scientific Lunar and Martian analog simulations. The organization owns 4 training space suits: 2 LEM (Lunar Extravehicular Mobility suit) for surface exploration, two underwater visor-up training suits, and one underwater pressurized NBL visor-down suit Wydra (english: Otter). Analog Astronaut Training Center together with the International Institute of Astronautical Sciences, also organizes two EVA pre-familiarization trainings in the Neutral Buoyancy Laboratory in Groton, Connecticut, USA.
- Arctic Mars Analog Svalbard Expedition (AMASE) – This NASA-funded annual expedition uses various field sites on the Svalbard archipelago (Norway) because these sites are thought to be analogous to sites on ancient Mars. These sites provide an excellent opportunity to test hardware and instruments to assist in detection and characterization of low levels of microbiota and organic and mineralogical biomarkers.
- Asclepios – A student-led analogue space mission program originating from students of the École Polytechnique Fédérale de Lausanne focusing on short-term scientific missions organized in Switzerland. Its first mission, Asclepios I, took place between 12th-20th of July 2021 in the caves of the Grimsel Test Site.
- Cooperative Adventure for Valuing and Exercising human behaviour and performance Skills (ESA-CAVES), is a European Space Agency astronaut training course in which international astronauts train in a space-analogue cave environment.
- Construction of a Habitat Inside a Lunar-analogue Lava tube - ICEE Space, Iceland (CHILL-ICE): One of a kind lava tube mission where selected analog astronauts build a habitat in Icelandic lava tubes and perform scientific experiments to explore In-Situ Resource Utilization (ISRU). Past research includes rover robustness to rough terrain, analog astronaut's physical and mental performance under high pressure and in extreme environments as well as lava tube communications.
- Crew Health and Performance Exploration Analog (CHAPEA) – Missions simulating a year long stay on the surface of Mars.
- Desert Research and Technology Studies (D-RATS) – This NASA-funded program tests hardware, such as rover prototypes, and operations concepts, like sample-collection techniques, in the Arizona desert every fall.
- Desert Mars Analog Ramon Station (D-MARS) - Is an analogue mission to mars, taking place in Makhtesh Ramon (-Ramon crater) located in the Israel's Negev desert. Ramon's geological features bear similarity to the soil condition of Mars's soil. In addition, the mission takes place in the crater because of its relative abundance. Several missions have been carried out since the beginning of 2018, each staffed by six Ramonauts (what crew members are called). They have accomplished many experiments in many disciplines, including physics, soil studies, microbial studies, psychology, agriculture, water supply, and engineering. Between 15Oct-15Nov2020, the Austrian Space Forum – in cooperation with the Israel Space Agency as the host agency and D-MARS – will conduct an integrated Mars analog field mission in the Negev Desert in Israel - the AMADEE-20 Mars simulation. The expedition will be carried out in a Martian terrestrial analog and directed by a dedicated Mission Support Center in Austria. A small field crew of highly trained analog astronauts with spacesuit simulators will conduct experiments preparing for future human and robotic Mars exploration missions.
- Habitat Marte - a permanent analog station in a semiarid region of Brazil, 120 km west of Natal. Habitat Marte consists of one brick-and-mortar station with a greenhouse for hydroponics and aquaponics research, as well as an auditorium for education events. The station is the only one in the world featuring a swimming pool for underwater EVAs. Habitat Marte conducts monthly analog missions and is open for applicants around the world.
- Haughton Mars Project (HMP) – This project on Devon Island in the Arctic is run jointly by SETI and the Mars Society. The project utilizes the Mars-like features of the Island and the impact crater to develop and test new technologies and field operating procedures, and to study the human dynamics which result from extended contact in close quarters.
- Human Exploration Research Analog (HERA) – NASA's 650 square foot habitat designed for isolation, confinement, and remote scenarios.
- Inflatable Lunar-Mars Analog Habitat (ILMAH) – This NASA-funded program utilizes the Inflatable Lunar-Mars Analog Habitat, owned and operated by the University of North Dakota's Human Spaceflight Laboratory, to simulate and develop human in the loop systems to be used for planetary space exploration.
- Ladakh Human Analogue Mission (LHAM) - In order to provide appropriate interplanetary conditions for astronaut training, ISRO's Human Space Flight Centre worked with AAKA Space Studio, University of Ladakh, Ladakh Autonomous Hill Development Council and IIT Bombay on Ladakh Human Analogue Mission. This is to understand the challenges that future astronauts might have when venturing beyond of Earth. Hab-1 is a small, inflatable habitat that is part of the mission. In addition to testing life support systems, the expedition will gather biometric data, recreate an extraterrestrial environment, examine circadian lighting, and evaluate human health and endurance in isolation.
- LunAres Research Station - an analogue research station for crewed space mission simulation, located at the post-military airport in Poland, open for scientists and researchers. The station can hold a Lunar and Martian 2 weeks mission for a 6-person crew, providing space and infrastructure for complex research on the impact of long-term extra-terrestrial human presence. The base is fully isolated from the environment including 250 square meters of EVA area.
- Mars Analogue Research Station Program (MARS) – This project, run by the Mars Society, includes stations at Devon Island in the Arctic (FMARS) (see also HMP) and Southern Utah (MDRS). Multinational teams live and work at the stations for two to four weeks conducting simulated missions and science experiments, testing hardware and operational concepts.
- Mars-500 – This analog, located at the Russian Academy of Sciences Institute of Biomedical Problems (IBMP) in Moscow, Russia, placed a multinational crew of six into a spacecraft mock-up for a 520-day simulated mission to Mars. Their goal was to understand the psychological implications of long duration spaceflight.
- NASA Extreme Environment Mission Operations (NEEMO) – This NASA-funded program utilizes the Aquarius habitat, owned by NOAA and operated by the University of North Carolina Wilmington, to simulate operations in a challenging low-gravity environment. Groups of "aquanauts" live in Aquarius for up to three weeks at a time, performing EVAs around the habitat and the nearby coral reef.
- NASA Exploration Atmosphere – These missions take place in a three story altitude chamber at Johnson Space Center.
- NASA Moon and Mars Exploration Analog – Year long isolation and confinement mission to simulate interplanetary transit and planetary surface operations.
- NASA Neutral Buoyancy Lab – One of the largest pools in the world with a full scale mock up of the International Space Station. Used by leading space agencies for astronaut space walk training as well as emergency egress and response training.
- Pavilion Lake Research Project (PLRP) – This is a joint project between the Canadian Space Agency and NASA which conducts research on Pavilion Lake and others in British Columbia, Canada to explain the origin of freshwater microbialites, as well as to test operational concepts for deep space missions. While the lake is not a close physical analog to the Moon or Mars or an asteroid, the complex operations of the field team and back room in dealing with communications, power, safety, science, etc., make the project an excellent operational analog.
- PolAres – This interdisciplinary research programme by the Austrian Space Forum has undertaken a number of Mars analog missions and has conducted a multi-national field simulation in the Sahara desert near Erfoud in Morocco in February 2013.
- Project Moonwalk ("MOONWALK") – This project is funded by the European Commission under the “space activity” theme of the 7th Framework Programme is to develop and test technologies for astronaut-robot cooperation applied to Extra-Vehicular Activities (EVA) on planetary surfaces and training procedures for future human missions to Moon and Mars.
- Space Analog for the Moon and Mars – Hermetically sealed research habitat at the Biosphere 2.
