= Ladakh Human Analogue Mission =

Human analogue mission

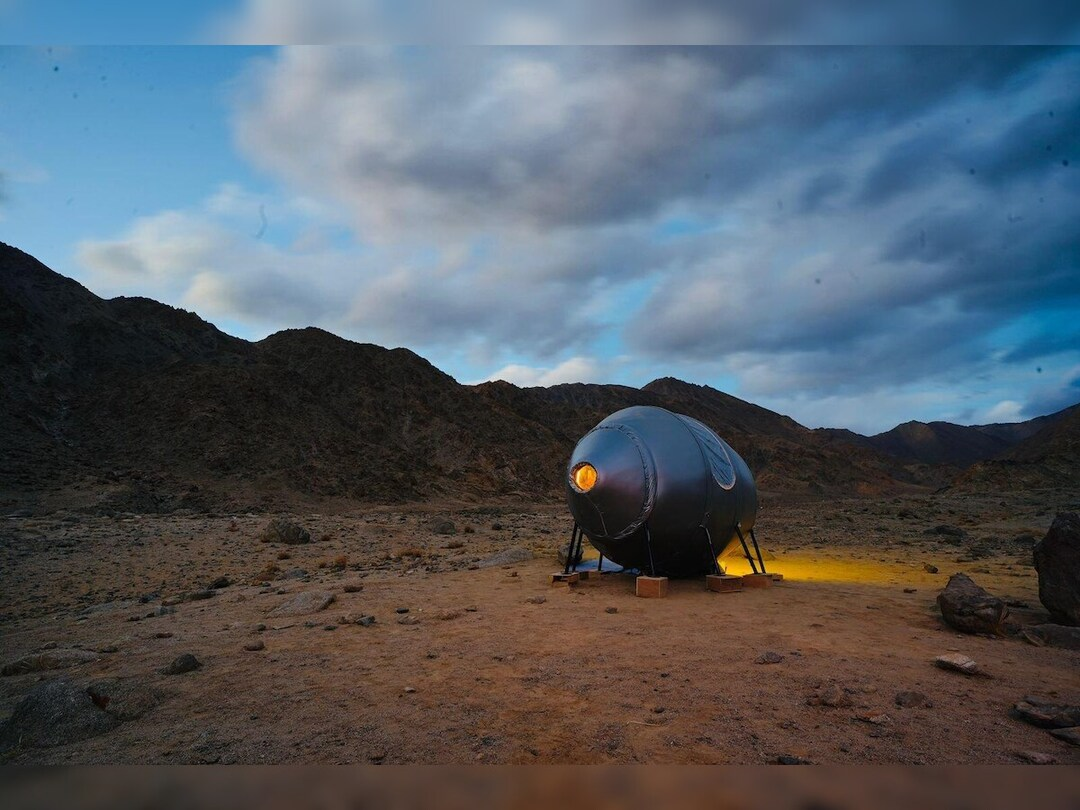
- Hab-1 from Ladakh Human Analogue Mission

Program overview
- Country: India
- Organization: Human Space Flight Centre (ISRO); AAKA Space Studio; University of Ladakh; IIT Bombay
- Purpose: Perform analogue space activities for future Moon and Mars missions.
- Status: Ongoing

Program history
- Duration: 2024 - present

Ladakh Human Analogue Mission (LHAM) is a human analog mission by ISRO's Human Space Flight Centre, AAKA Space Studio, University of Ladakh and IIT Bombay in collaboration with the Ladakh Autonomous Hill Development Council, Leh. The mission began on 1 November 2024. Mission aims to make suitable interplanetary conditions for astronaut training. This is India's first human analogue mission.

It is intended to improve understanding of the difficulties that future astronauts may face when traveling beyond Earth.

== Mission planning ==
Researchers from the Birbal Sahni Institute of Palaeosciences (BSIP) and Indian Institute of Science (IISc) determined that Ladakh is the best site for India's first Mars and Moon analogue research station. The study project was conducted by BSIP's Binita Phartiyal, IISc's Aloke Kumar who pioneered the idea of building space-bricks from biologically solidified lunar and Martian regolith, and Gaganyaan astronaut Shubhanshu Shukla. An analog research station is a location where plans and exercises intended for the Moon and Mars are made. The projected research station would be used for geological and astrobiological research, human studies, crew training, advancing Technology Readiness Levels (TRL), testing space technologies, and engineering integration.

Because of its distinct geological features that closely match Martian and lunar environments, Ladakh was selected as the mission's location. Its high altitude and cold, dry climate will make it the perfect place to test the tactics and technology required for extended space flights. The engineers and scientists will test robotic equipment, vehicles, habitats, communications during the expedition. They will also try to comprehend power generation, transportation, infrastructure, and storage.

Ladakh, which is more than 3,000 meters above sea level, has oxygen levels that are barely 40% of those at sea level. Because of the low oxygen and low pressure, scientists may test life support systems in environments that are comparable to those on Mars and the Moon.

In order to practice extravehicular activity and low-gravity duties necessary for upcoming missions to the Moon and Mars, the analog astronaut will capture biometric data every day, including body temperature, heart rate, oxygen levels, and other critical indications. A unique lighting system in the habitat will help control the astronaut's circadian rhythm, enhancing their well-being amid prolonged seclusion. The study will provide valuable data about how lighting might affect human health in space.

== Mission ==
At Leh in Ladakh, AAKA Space Studio and ISRO will be leading a 21-day Mars and Moon analog mission. An important step forward in India's efforts to develop human spaceflight and analog research in support of the Gaganyaan program and future missions like Bharatiya Antariksha Station. It will replicate the harsh conditions of extraterrestrial environments. Mission is equipped with a compact, inflatable habitat named Hab-1. The expedition will test human health and endurance in isolation, acquire biometric data, simulate extraterrestrial landscape, investigate circadian lighting, and test life support technologies. The startup has experimented with technology, human endurance, and habitat design in Rann of Kutch in 2023, simulating lunar conditions.

The endeavor was supported by the Ladakh Autonomous Hill Development Council and was jointly carried out by the Human Spaceflight Center, University of Ladakh, and IIT Bombay. Hab-1 has all the necessities, including a kitchen, sanitary facilities, and a hydroponics garden. As India plans long-duration space missions to the Moon, Mars, and beyond, it offers a self-sustaining environment and useful data. Hab-1 will also investigate how confinement and isolation affect human performance and health. The results could aid ISRO in comprehending the benefits, drawbacks, and viability of human-robotic exploration missions.

With an emphasis on sustainability, resource efficiency, and adaptability to challenging space conditions, AAKA Space Studio will explore innovative habitat designs. In order to gather important data for upcoming Moon and Mars missions, a lightweight, foldable fabric framework will be evaluated for performance and endurance in harsh environments. The primary objective is to use origami-inspired space architecture concepts to create, construct, and test folding, living structures.

== See also ==
- Bharatiya Antariksha Station
- Gaganyaan
- Human analog mission
- Human Space Flight Centre
