= D. K. Singh =

Indian space scientist

Dinesh Kumar Singh
- Citizenship: Indian
- Known for: Indian Human Spaceflight Programme (Gaganyaan)
- Scientific career
- Fields: Aerospace engineering, human spaceflight
- Workplaces: Indian Space Research Organisation (ISRO)

Dinesh Kumar Singh (also known as D. K. Singh) is an Indian space scientist and senior official of the Indian Space Research Organisation (ISRO). He is currently serving as the Director of the U. R. Rao Satellite Centre (URSC), Bengaluru. Prior to this role, he served as Director of the Human Space Flight Centre (HSFC), Bengaluru, which is responsible for the implementation of India’s human spaceflight programme, including the Gaganyaan mission.

== Early Life and Education ==
D. K. Singh was born in the Varanasi district of Uttar Pradesh, India. He is an alumnus of Harcourt Butler Technical University and the Indian Institute of Technology (BHU) Varanasi, where he completed his undergraduate and postgraduate studies, respectively.

== Career ==
Following his graduation, Singh joined the Space Applications Centre (SAC) in July 1989, where he spent a significant part of his career. During his tenure at SAC, he worked on satellite payload systems and programme management. He later served as Group Director of the Radio Frequency Systems Group and subsequently as Associate Director.

Singh later moved to the Human Space Flight Centre (HSFC), where he served as its fourth Director. In this role, he oversaw key aspects of India’s human spaceflight programme, including crew module and life-support systems, astronaut training and mission planning, as well as integration of medical and safety systems.

On 1 September 2026, he assumed charge as the Director of the U. R. Rao Satellite Centre, Bengaluru.

== Awards and Honours ==
His recognitions include the ISRO Merit Award and the Astronautical Society of India (ASI) Award.
