= D-MARS =

Simulated mission to Mars in Israel

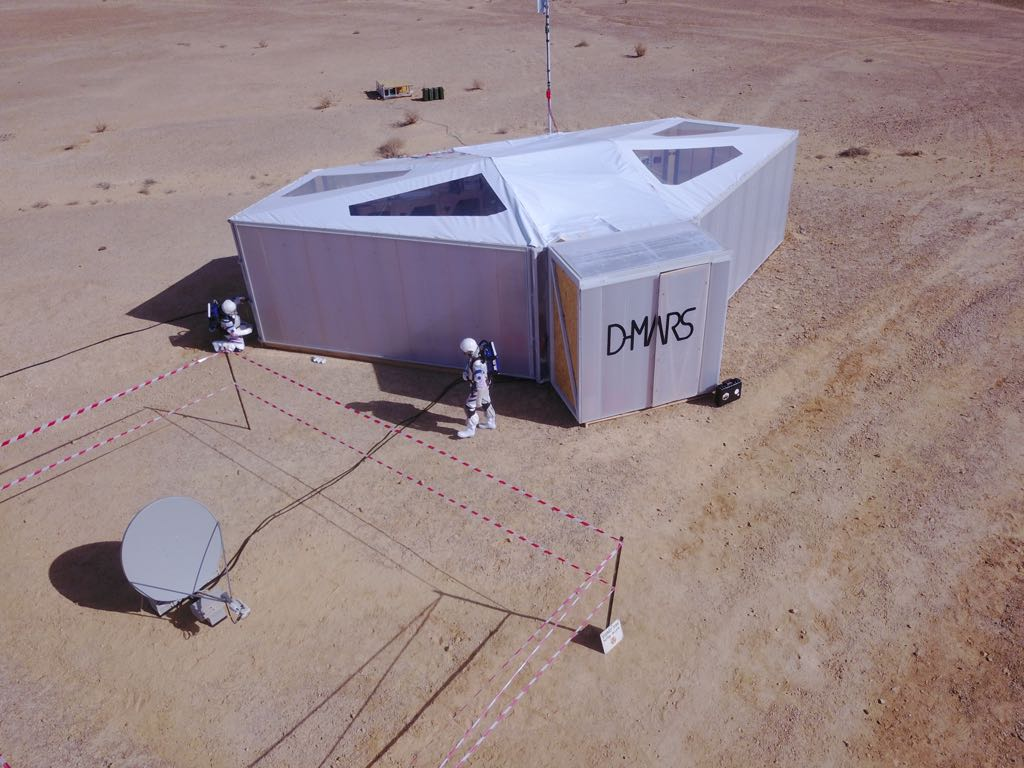
The habitat and two ramonauts

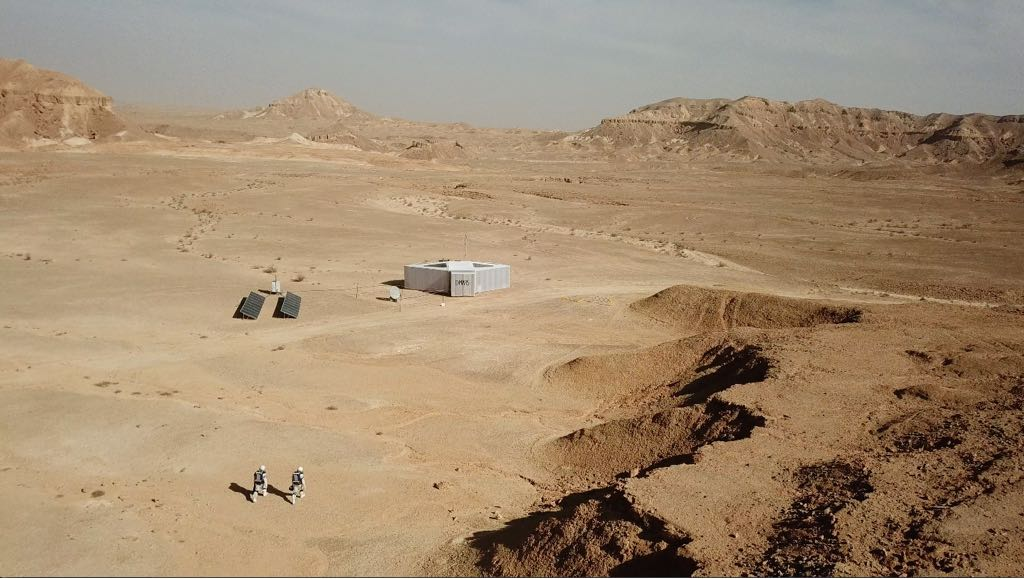
The habitat, two ramonauts and part of the crater view

D-MARS is a human analog mission to the planet Mars, taking place in Makhtesh Ramon in the Negev desert in Israel. D-MARS is an acronym for "Desert Mars Analog Ramon Station" and its crew are known as "ramonauts". Ramon's geological features and aridity are similar to those of Mars. The mission site is a valley that resembles the impact craters of Mars.

== History ==
Several missions have been carried out since the beginning of 2018, each staffed by six crew. They have performed experiments across many disciplines, including physics, soil studies, microbial studies, psychology, agriculture, water supply and engineering. Their suits were designed by the Israeli fashion designer Alon Livne.

The first mission took place for 4 days in February 2018. In 2019 the mission lasted for 11 days and in 2020 two student missions were held in March and 5 day training were held in November. In 2021 the mission took place from 4 to 31 October and six astronauts from Austria, Germany, Israel, the Netherlands, Portugal and Spain took part in the mission with mutual cooperation of Austrian Space Forum and Israel Space Agency.

== See also ==
- List of Mars analogs
