= List of buildings in the Johnson Space Center =

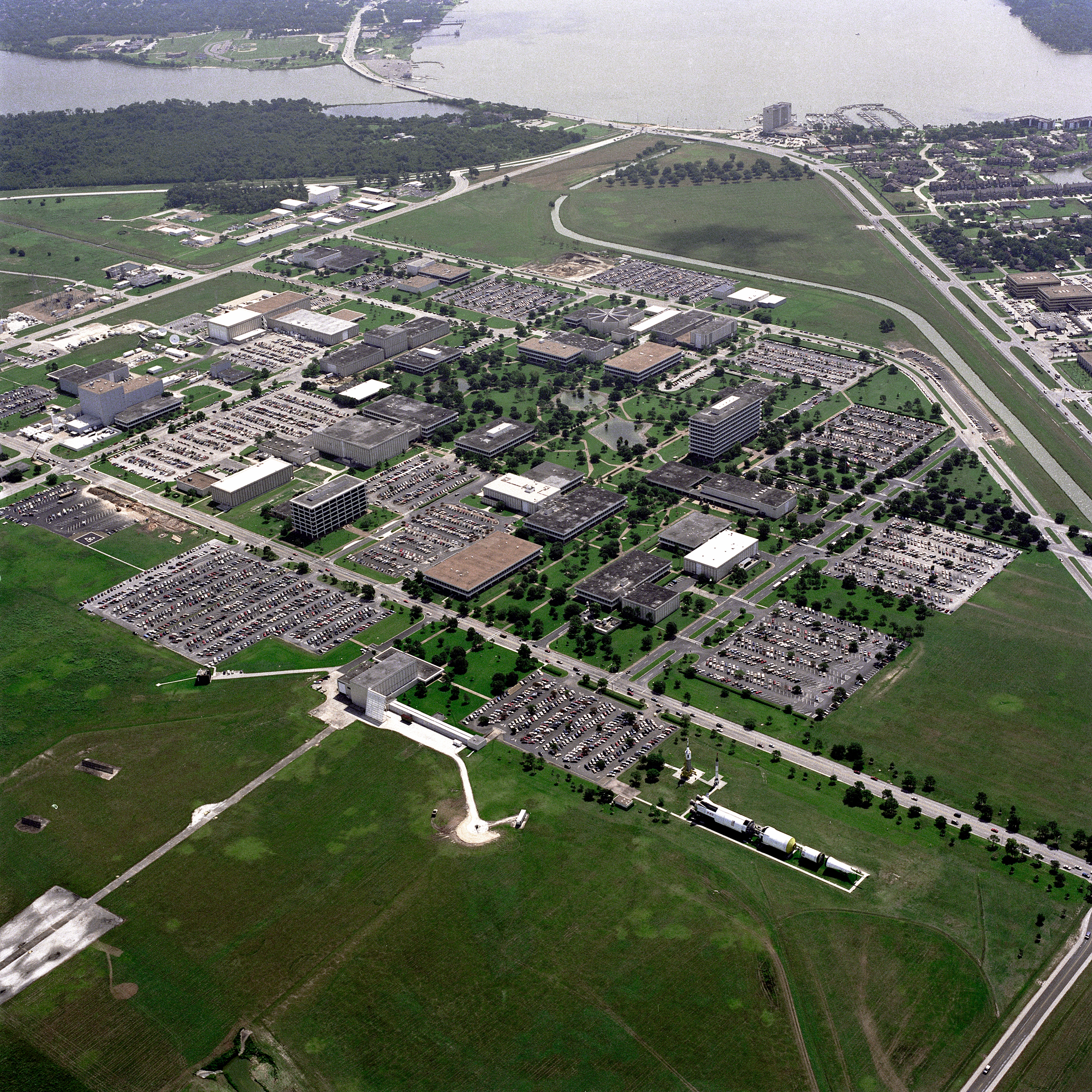
An aerial view of Johnson Space Center (1989)

The buildings in the Johnson Space Center house facilities of the National Aeronautics and Space Administration's human spaceflight activities. The center consists of a complex of 100 buildings constructed on 1,620 acres (656 ha) located in southeast Houston, Texas.

A typical building at Johnson Space Center is numbered and not named. A partial listing of building numbers and what is contained in them follows:

Building	Description	Opened
1	Headquarters of JSC, including the offices of senior management and the JSC director	1963
2	Public Affairs Office, Media briefing room, video production, and audio processing facilities (The JSC Visitors Center was a tenant until the opening of Space Center Houston in October 1992.)	1963
3	Main cafeteria and JSC Exchange Store	1963
4-N	Mission Operations support offices including Flight Director's Office	1963
4-S	Mission Operations support offices and Flight Crew Operations Division (including Astronaut Office)	1993
5	Space Mission Simulation Facility (including the recently retired Shuttle Mission Simulators, or SMS, the ISS Mission Simulator, the Orion Mission Simulator, and the T-38 Flight Simulator)	1966
7	Crew and Thermal Systems Division, including the vacuum chambers and space suit testing facilities, including the Environmental Test Article (ETA) Shuttle airlock vacuum chamber, the Space Station Airlock Test Article (SSATA) vacuum chamber, and the NASA 20-Foot Chamber	1963
8	Photographic Laboratory and Multimedia Operations Facility	1963
9	Space Vehicle Mockup Facility (SVMF), including full-scale International Space Station module mockups and MPCV Orion developmental mockups. The Space Shuttle training mockups have been donated to outside organizations at the conclusion of the Space Shuttle Program, and have been removed.	1966/1967
10	Engineering fabrication facility and machine shop	1963
11	Satellite cafeteria and JSC Exchange Store	1966
12	Office of Education, Human Resources Office, Language Lab, and Financial Management Division	1963
13	Structures and Mechanics Laboratory	1963
14	Electromagnetic compliance studies building	1966
15	Human and Environmental Factors offices	1966?
16; 16A	Shuttle Avionics Integration Laboratory (SAIL), where software and hardware changes are tested to insure they function well with the whole vehicle in a simulated flight environment. Also houses the Systems Engineering Simulator (SES).	1963
17	Space Food Systems Laboratory Offices for Space Exploration.	
18	Morpheus Command Center	
20	Safety and Mission Assurance, Office of Procurement	2010
21	Human Health and Performance Laboratory	2017
24	Central Heating and Cooling Plant	
25		
26	Columbia Center	2010
27	Astronaut Quarantine Facility	2005
28	Auxiliary chiller facility	1991
29	Crew Exploration Vehicle (CEV) Avionics Integration Laboratory; (CAIL) will be used to perform integrated avionics and flight software requirements verification. Originally served as the Weightless Environment Training Facility before the larger Neutral Buoyancy Laboratory was constructed to the north of the Johnson Space Center. The round portion of the building used to house a centrifuge which was used for astronaut training during the Gemini and Apollo eras.	1966
30-A	Mission Operations Directorate functional offices (Flight Design - FIDO, Ground Control - GC, etc.). The A in the building designation stands for Administration.	1965
30-M	Christopher C. Kraft Jr. Mission Control Center, the historic Mission Control Center. This building is home to FCR1 (formerly MOCR-1), which is the flight control room for International Space Station, FCR2 (MOCR-2), which is known as the Historic Apollo Control Room, as well as multiple controller consoles and the training flight control room (Red FCR). The M in the building designation stands for Main building.	1965
30-S	Mission Control Center Space Station White FCR (formally the Space Shuttle control room, now ISS), Blue FCR (interim Orion Control Room), as well as flight consoles and data facilities. The S in the building designation stands for Space Station, as the entire building, especially the White Flight Control Room, was originally built-out for use by Space Station Freedom. During the build-out decisions were made to share resources between the Space Shuttle, station, and the White FCR, was changed to Shuttle during this process.	1993?
31	Astromaterials Research and Exploration Science	1966
31-N	Lunar Sample Laboratory Facility	
32	Space Environment Simulation Laboratory; two very large thermal-vacuum chambers for testing flight hardware, designated as a National Historic Landmark	1966
33	Space Environment Simulation Test Facility with several small thermal-vacuum chambers for testing flight hardware	1966
34		
35	Guidance and Navigation Simulation Facility (hosted a fixed base crew station of the Shuttle Mission Simulator, and offices); demolished in 2018	
36		
37	Life Sciences Laboratory; formerly the Lunar Receiving Laboratory	
41	Plant Operations Administration; formerly the Hypo/Hyperbaric Training Facility and Physiological Training Facility. Demolished on December 18, 2013.	1970
42		
43		
44	Communications and Tracking Division; formerly the Communications and Tracking Development Laboratory, Electronics Systems Test Laboratory and Audio Development Laboratory	1966
45	Project Engineering; also housed the Mission Evaluation Room	1966
45-N	Occupational Clinic; formerly the Technical Library	1966
46	Central Computing Facility	1989
47		
48	Mission Control Power Plant	
49	Vibration and Acoustic Test Facility	
50		
52		
56	Collaborative working space for JSC employees	
57	Collaborative working space for JSC employees	
59		
95		
105		
110	Security headquarters just outside the NASA gates by the employee entrance. Security issues badges for employees, contractors, and visitors.	
111	Industry Assistance Office	
163		
204		
207	Gilruth Center	
208	Gilruth Sports Park	
211	Aaron Cohen Childcare Center; current building replaced a smaller one constructed in 1990.	2000
220	Houses CHAPEA and HERA programs.	
221		
222	Atmospheric Reentry Materials and Structures Evaluation Facility; demolished in 2017.	1966
223		
225	Administrative Support Facility Annex; formerly the Space Science Interim Facility; demolished on August 14, 2014.	1968
226	Administrative Support Facility Annex; first building constructed at JSC; demolished on November 14, 2014.	1963
227	Printing and Reproduction Facility; originally designed to support the first Apollo Program flight, which required real-time documents for astronaut training; primarily a large offset printing shop, producing the Space News Roundup and crew "pocket" flight plans; demolished in August 2021	1965
228	Environmental Hygiene Laboratory	
229	Environmental Support Facility	
230	Utility Annex	
231	Custodial Storage	
232	Custodial Administration Facility	
241		
259	Astronaut Selection and Isolation Quarters	1967
260	Water Immersion Facility	
261	Planetary and Earth Sciences Lab	
262A	Storage Building No. 1	
262B		
263	Health Physics Laboratory	
264		
265		
266	Medical Data Support Facility	
267	Space Materials Research Laboratory	
268A	Planetary Analog Test Site, also known as the "Rock Yard." Simulates features of the lunar and Martian surface terrain, used for testing vehicle and spacesuit design	
269		
272		
305		
319		
320		
322		
325		
326		
327		
329		
330		
331		
332		
333		
334		
335		
336		
337		
338		
339		
340		
341		
342		
343		
347		
348		
349		
350		
351		
352		
353		
354		
356A		
357		
358		
359		
360		
361		
380		
381		
382		
411		
412		
413		
415		
416		
417		
418		
419	Metrology Standards and Calibration Laboratory (MSCL)	
420		
421		
422		
423		
424		
425		
T588		
T589	Large Vehicle Inspection	

== See also ==
- Mission Control Center
- Neutral Buoyancy Laboratory
- Ellington Field
- NASA 20-Foot Chamber
