= Nirmala S Maurya =

Indian academic administrator (born 1958)

- Born: 5 August 1958 (age 67); Kanpur, Uttar Pradesh, India
- Known for: Educationist
- Parents: Surendra Singh Kushwaha (father); Chandrawati Kushwaha (mother)
- Relatives: Saket Kushwaha (Brother)
- Website: www.vbspu.ac.in/vice-chancellor/

Nirmala S Maurya (born 5 August 1958) is the first woman Vice Chancellor of Veer Bahadur Singh Purvanchal University, Jaunpur, Uttar Pradesh who served the office from August 2020 till August 2023. Former Registrar of Higher Education and Research Institute, Dakshina Bharat Hindi Prachar Sabha, Madras. Her father, Surendra Singh Kushwaha, was a professor in the physics department of Banaras Hindu University and also served as VC of Ranchi University, Jharkhand and Mahatma Gandhi Kashi Vidyapith, Uttar Pradesh, and her brother Saket Kushwaha served as vice chancellor of Lalit Narayan Mithila University from 2014 to 2017 and also served as vice chancellor of Rajiv Gandhi University from 2018 to 2024.

== Tenure ==
During her tenure as Vice Chancellor she organised the world heritage week in the Veer Bahadur Singh Purvanchal University at its Vivekananda Central Library. At this occasion, she also inaugurated a heritage gallery. In her inauguration speech she stated that the purpose of heritage week is to connect the youth with the cultural heritage of the Purvanchal region of Uttar Pradesh and of the country as a whole.

== Awards ==
She was awarded with Mahatma Gandhi International Award in 2020 In 2021, she was chosen for the Premchand International Award, which is provided for outstanding work in the field of literature.

== Criticism ==
She was criticised by former Vice Chancellor of University, Raja Ram Yadav of not undertaking any significant work in the university. Yadav accused her of inlaying stones in name of infrastructure development in the university.
