= NASA 20-Foot Chamber =

Human-rated vacuum chamber

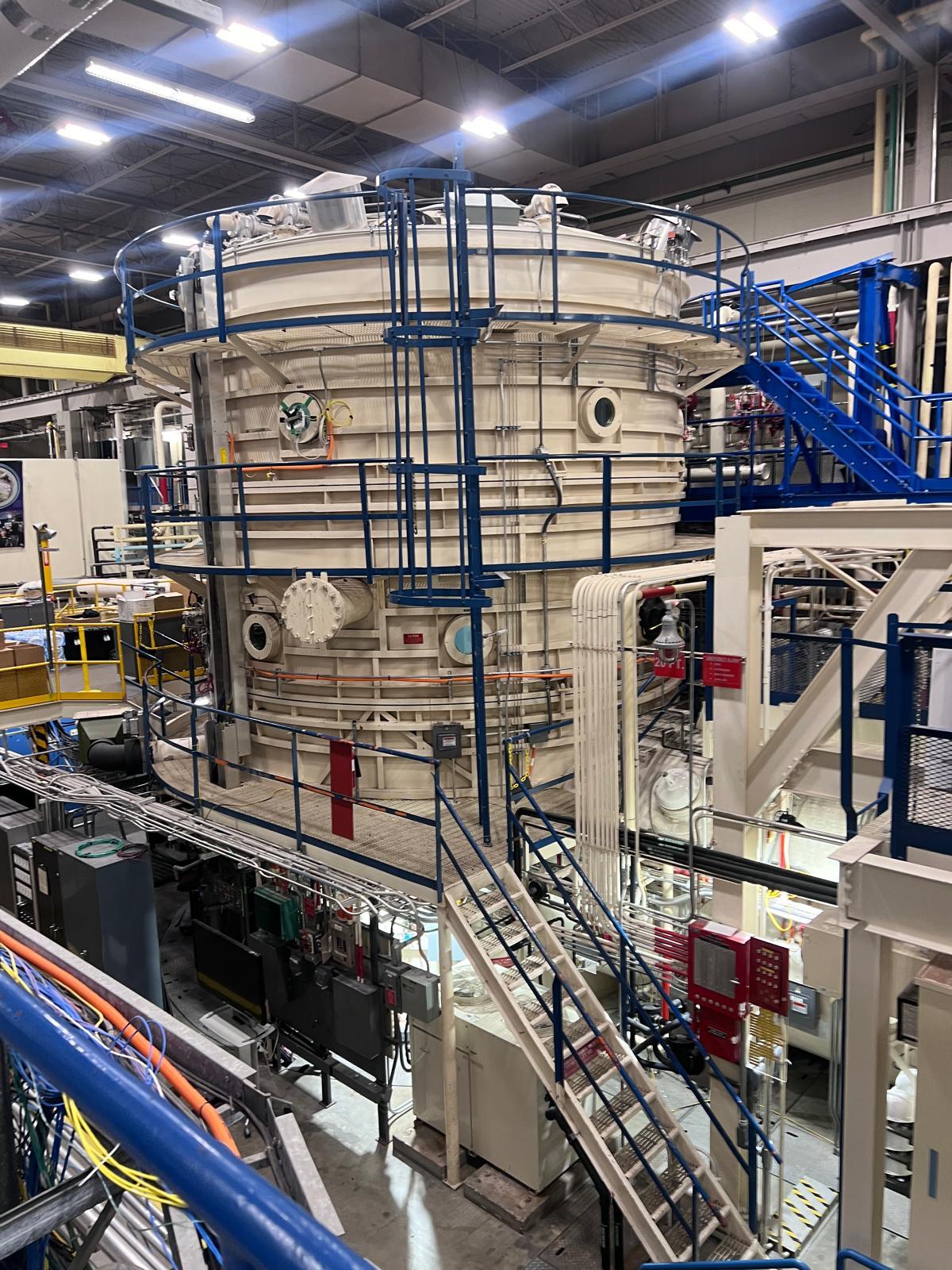
20ft altitude chamber inside building 7 at Johnson Space Center.

The 20-Foot Chamber at NASA's Johnson Space Center (JSC) is located in Building 7. It is a three-story human-rated vacuum chamber configured to support deep-space environmental-control and life-support systems (ECLSS), physiology, and food-related science research. It is an integral part of the NASA Human Exploration System Testbed for the Integration and Advancement (HESTIA) Project, the Exploration Atmosphere Project, and the Artemis Program's return to the Moon. The facility is unique among NASA infrastructure for its specific chamber geometry and built-in support systems, making it the only NASA site capable of conducting certain types of advanced ECLSS and life-support technology testing.

== Historical significance ==
The 20-Foot Chamber has a legacy of supporting key space missions including Gemini, Apollo, and Skylab. In the 1990s, it was instrumental in 30-, 60-, and 90-day human closed-loop ECLSS tests that contributed to the development of systems for the International Space Station (ISS). In the 2020s, it is used for the Exploration Atmosphere program to better understand potential decompression protocols for the Human Landing System.

== Design and capabilities ==
Internally, it maintains a single pressure atmosphere and is divided into three levels. The facility supports a range of advanced test scenarios, including reduced-pressure testing, elevated-oxygen atmosphere experiments, and decompression illness testing.
