= Saket Kushwaha =

Indian educationist and agricultural economist

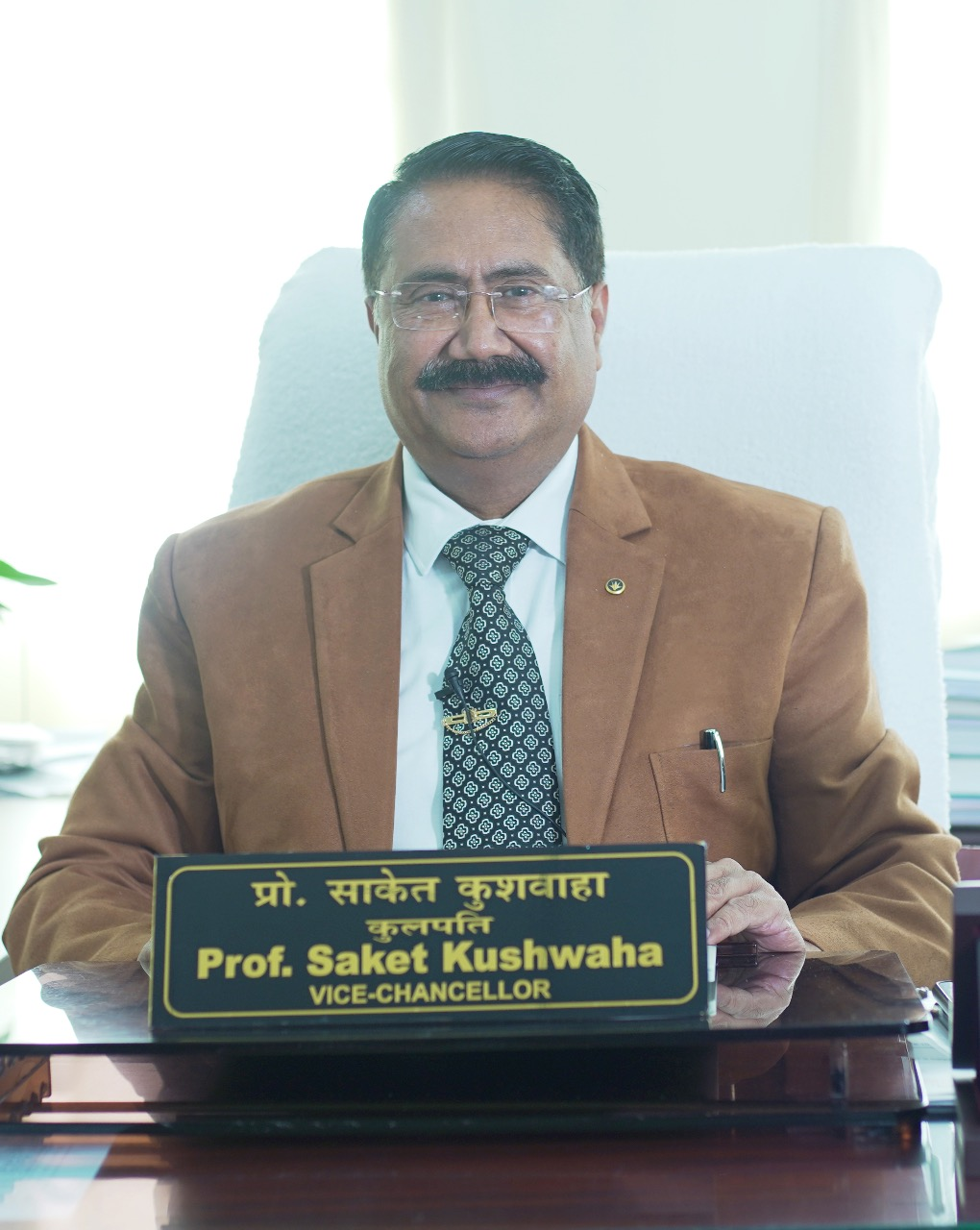
- Kushwaha as the vice chancellor
- Born: 28 August 1963 (age 63); Kanpur, Uttar Pradesh, India
- Education: Banaras Hindu University
- Occupations: Professor; Administrator
- Organization(s): University of Ladakh; Rajiv Gandhi University; Lalit Narayan Mithila University; Banaras Hindu University; Federal University of Technology Bauchi
- Parents: Surendra Singh Kushwaha (father); Chandrawati Kushwaha (mother)
- Relatives: Nirmala S Maurya (Sister)

Saket Kushwaha (born 28 August 1963) is an Indian educationist and agricultural economist. He is serving as Vice Chancellor (VC) of University of Ladakh and is a former Vice Chancellor of Rajiv Gandhi University, Arunachal Pradesh and Lalit Narayan Mithila University, Bihar. He is a Professor of Agricultural Economics at the Banaras Hindu University, on lien.

== Early life and education ==
Kushwaha was born on 28 August 1963 in Bhimsen, Kanpur, Uttar Pradesh, India. His father, Surendra Singh Kushwaha, was Professor in the Physics department of Banaras Hindu University and also served as VC of Ranchi University, Jharkhand and Mahatma Gandhi Kashi Vidyapith, Uttar Pradesh. and his sister Nirmala S Maurya is a first women Vice Chancellor of Veer Bahadur Singh Purvanchal University, Jaunpur, Uttar Pradesh who served the office from August 2020 till August 2023.Saket Kushwaha has B.Sc. in agriculture (1983) and an M.Sc. (1986), and Ph.D. (1992) in Agricultural Economics from Banaras Hindu University.

== Career ==
Kushwaha has served as the dean of the School of Management at Federal University of Technology Bauchi, Nigeria from 1993 to 2006. In 2006 he joined as Professor at Banaras Hindu University. In 2014 he was appointed Vice-Chancellor of Lalit Narayan Mithila University where he served until 2017. From 2017 to 2018 he served as Professor-in-charge for Rajiv Gandhi South Campus Banaras Hindu University. In October 2018 he was appointed Vice-Chancellor of Rajiv Gandhi University where he served till October 2024. He currently serves as Vice Chancellor of the University of Ladakh from February 2025 onwards.
