= Asclepios Project =

Asclepios Program
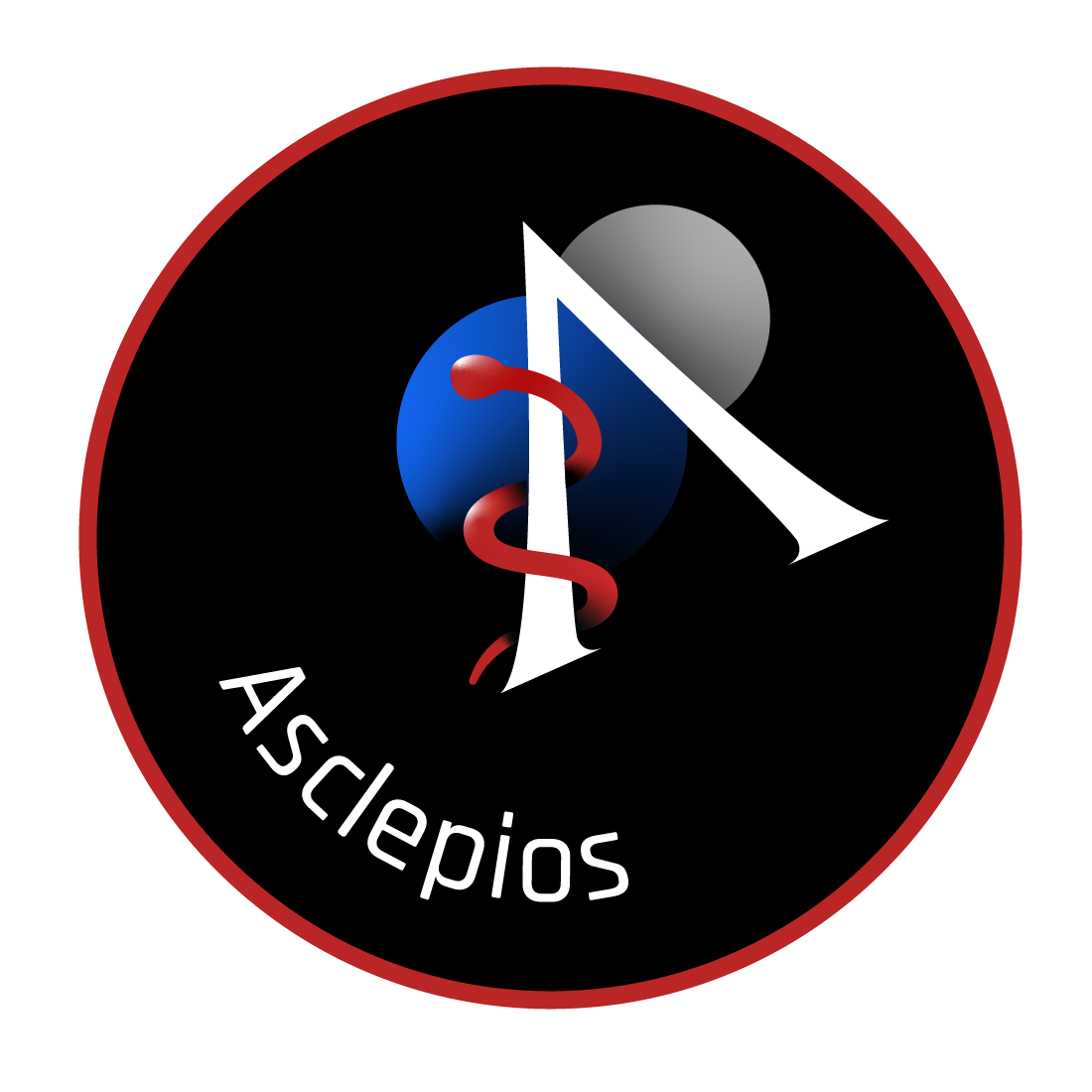

Program overview
- Country: Switzerland
- Organization: EPFL
- Purpose: Organize and perform analogue space missions for students
- Status: Ongoing

Program history
- Cost: 180'000 CHF (2022)
- Duration: 2019 - present
- First flight: 12.07.2021
- Successes: 5

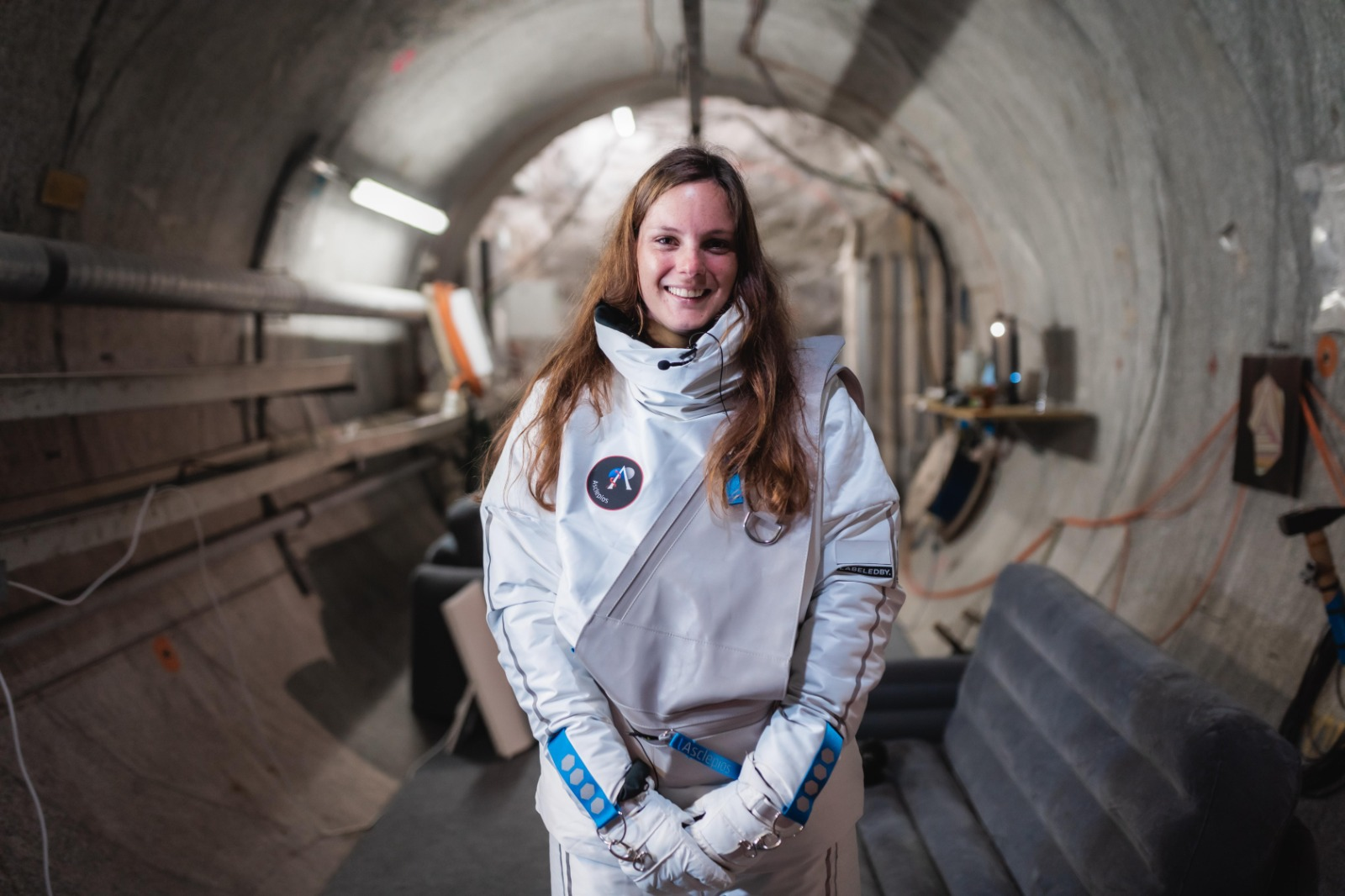
Eleonore Poli, commander of the analogue astronauts crew of Asclepios I in the Grimsel Test Site underground tunnels.

Asclepios is a program of space analogue missions designed by students for students, under the mentorship of trained professionals. It seeks to simulate short-term space missions on another celestial body, such as the Moon or Mars, thus paving the way to the future space exploration of the Solar System.

The Asclepios missions are exclusively opened to students with the goal of arousing their interest in future space endeavors as becoming astronauts, space engineers or members of the Mission Control Center. The purpose of analog missions is to help organizations within the space domain test their processes or products in a realistic environment. The objectives of the Asclepios missions are to act as an enabler for scientific entities, to train students through their work, and to promote space sciences. Experts and professionals such as Swiss astronaut Claude Nicollier act as mentors and advisors regarding the mission preparation.

== History ==
This Asclepios program was launched in August 2019 by two physics students at EPFL (École Polytechnique Fédérale de Lausanne), Marcellin Féasson and Chloé Carrière, with the goal to organize a group of students to prepare and perform an analogue space mission. Recruitment efforts for the team started in September 2019 in preparation for the Asclepios I mission while applications to join the analogue astronaut crew were received from students worldwide.

The first mission of the program, Asclepios I, was organized in July 2021 in the Bernese Alps at the Grimsel Test Site after having been postponed due to the COVID-19 pandemic. It was the work of 70 project members from more than 20 countries around the world.

Since November 2020, Asclepios has been recognized by EPFL (École Polytechnique Fédérale de Lausanne) as a MAKE project, making it an interdisciplinary student effort with an educational impact. Two following iterations, Asclepios II and III, were realised in 2022 and 2023 respectively, and Asclepios IV is planned for 2024.

== Asclepios program ==
=== Asclepios I ===
Asclepios I was a Moon analogue mission focusing on short-duration (8 days) scientific mission in Lunar lava tubes. It was organised in July 2021 and located in the tunnels of the Grimsel Test Site of the Swiss nuclear waste technical competence centre Nagra (National Cooperative for the Disposal of Radioactive Waste) located in the Swiss Alps. Experiments were conducted during the mission in collaboration with academic laboratories and companies. They included psychological study of the analogue astronauts behaviour, environmental studies, and product testing of space related technical solutions. Some of the experiments required to perform extravehicular activities with simulated spacesuits. Selected from 200 applicants, students forming the astronaut crew were six analogue astronauts with specialized roles (commander, base engineer, payload specialist, communication specialist and health officers) with 2 supporting back-ups. The astronauts were supported at all times by a Mission Control Center composed only of students trained to follow procedures inspired by those of the European Space Agency.

The co-leaders of the Asclepios I mission were as follows:

- Chloé Carrière
- Marcelin Féasson
- Elfie Roy
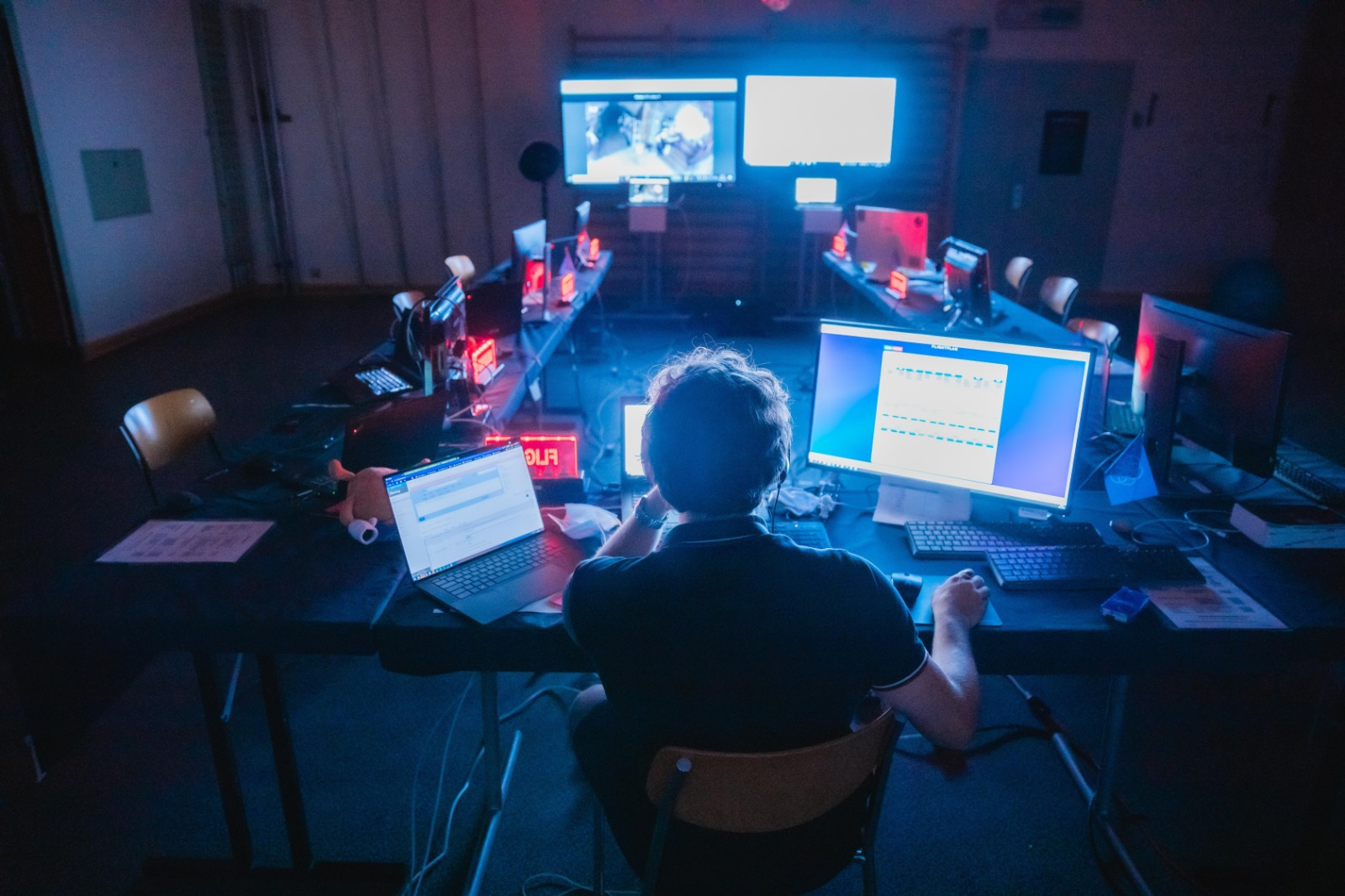
Mission control center of Asclepios I at night.

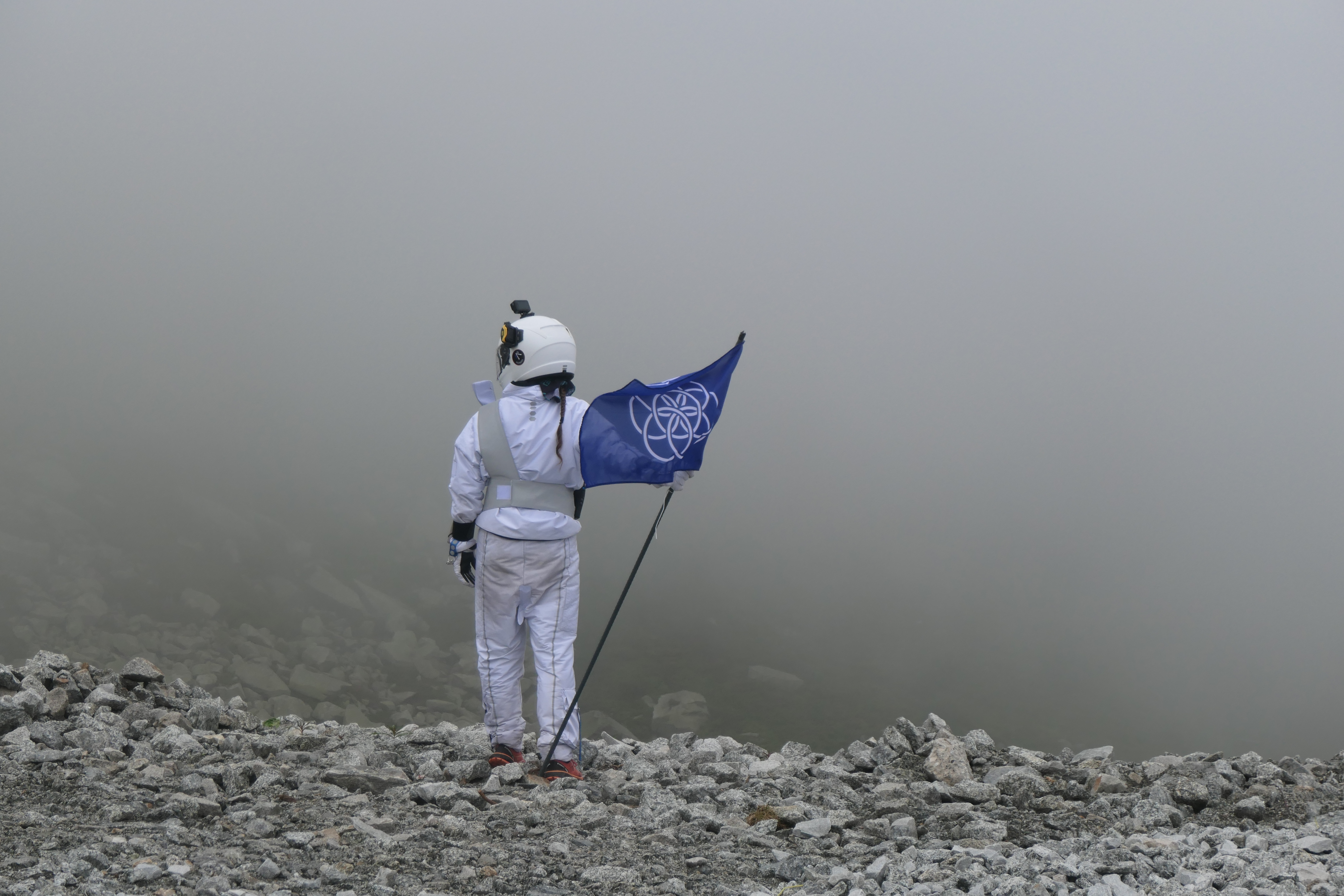
Analogue astronaut of Asclepios I during a scientific EVA.

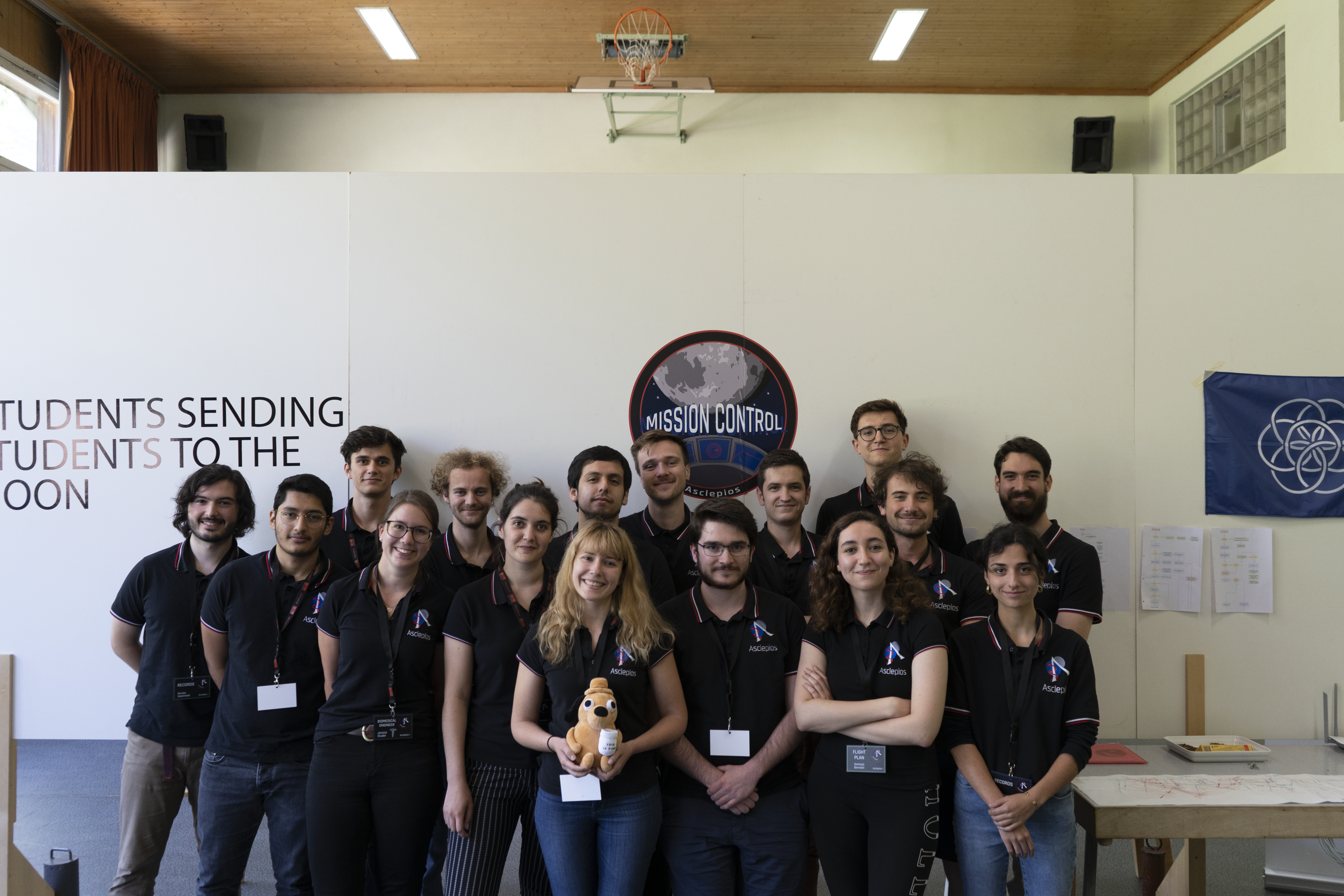
Members of the Asclepios I Mission Control Center.

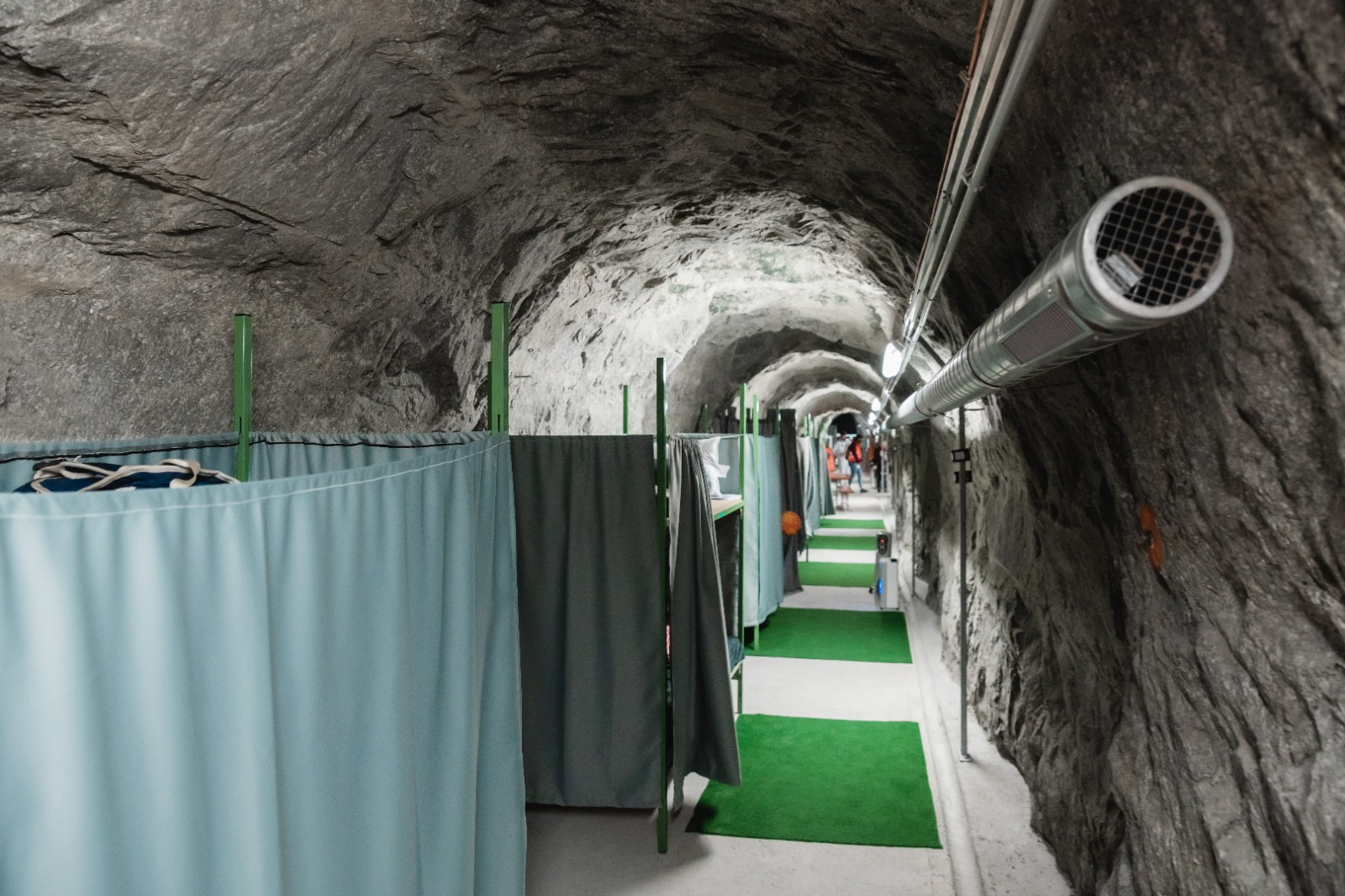
Sleeping area of the analogue Moon base of the Asclepios I mission.

Asclepios I crewmembers were as follows:

- Eléanore Poli (Switzerland, Britain, France, Italy), Commander
- Sebasthian Ogalde (Chile)
- Willem Suter (Switzerland, Belgium, USA)
- Manuela Raimbault (France)
- Sophie Lismore (Switzerland, United Kingdom, Ireland)
- Julien Corsin (France)
- Aubin Antonsanti (France)
- Marcellin Feasson (France, Switzerland)
- Christian Cardinaux (Switzerland)

=== Asclepios II ===
Asclepios II was a 14-day lunar analogue mission conducted in Sasso San Gottardo, a Swiss world war era fortress near Gotthard Pass, Switzerland. The goal of the mission was to simulate a base on the South Pole of the Moon, with the scientific goal revolving around the utilization of in-situ ressources. Recruitment for Asclepios II began in June 2020, but the final phase of the selection, involving an in-person interview weekend, was postponed until September 2021 due to COVID. The mission itself took place in July 2022. Asclepios II built on the framework of Asclepios I and included similar experiments, trainings, and a similar Mission Control Center. Asclepios II differed from the first iteration of the mission in terms of mission location and duration. It was the first time the mission was prepared in only one year time. Nine crewmembers were chosen, with six entering the base.

The co-leaders of the Asclepios II mission were as follows:

- Veronica Orlandi (Project Leader)
- Loïc Lerville-Rouyer (Head of Astronauts)

The Asclepios II crew were as follows:

- Felix von Horstig (Germany), Commander
- Elena López-Contreras González (Spain)
- Katie Mulry (United States)
- Somaya Bennani (Morocco)
- Roman Pohorsky (Switzerland)
- Tatiana Lopez (Chile, Canada)
- Joshua Bernard-Cooper (United Kingdom)
- Zaria Serfontein (South Africa, Ireland)
- Julia Pürstl (Austria)

Asclepios II was also notable for its appearance in the documentary Mission Asclepios, made by Swiss filmmaker Patrik Soergel. The crew followed the mission from the recruitment of the astronauts in September 2021 until the end of the mission in July 2022. The film won Best Documentary and Best Feature Film at the Brooklyn SciFi Film Festival and was nominated as Best European TV Documentary of the Year at Prix Europa, in addition to other awards and nominations received around the world.

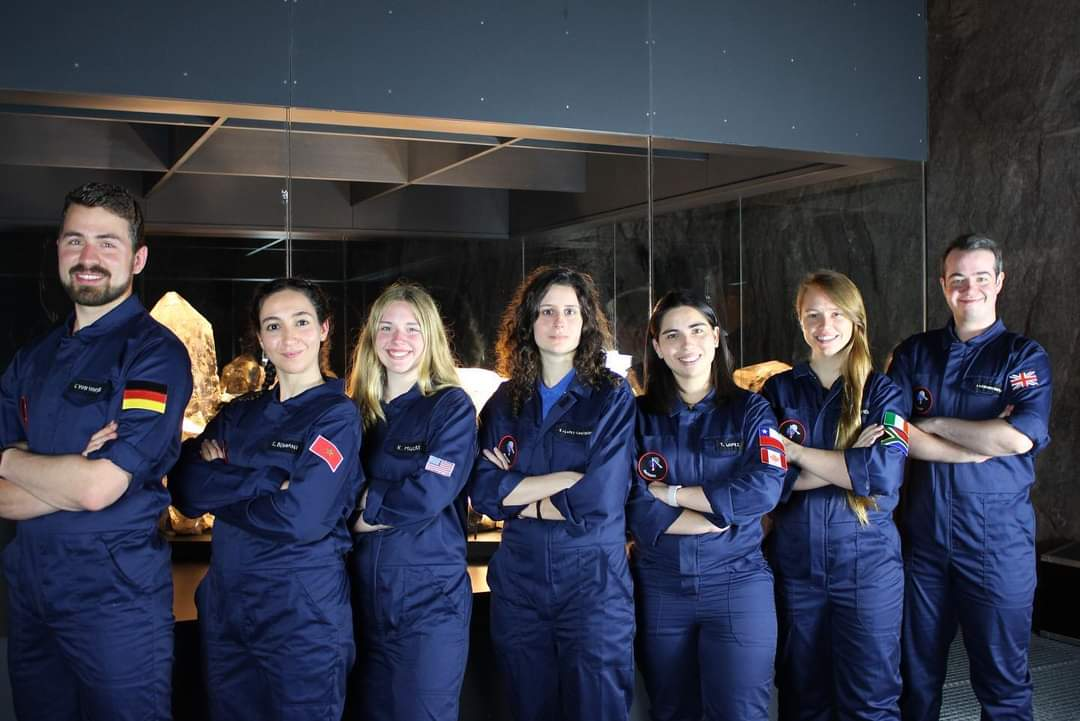
Asclepios II Mission Control Center members at the Sasso San Gottardo site.

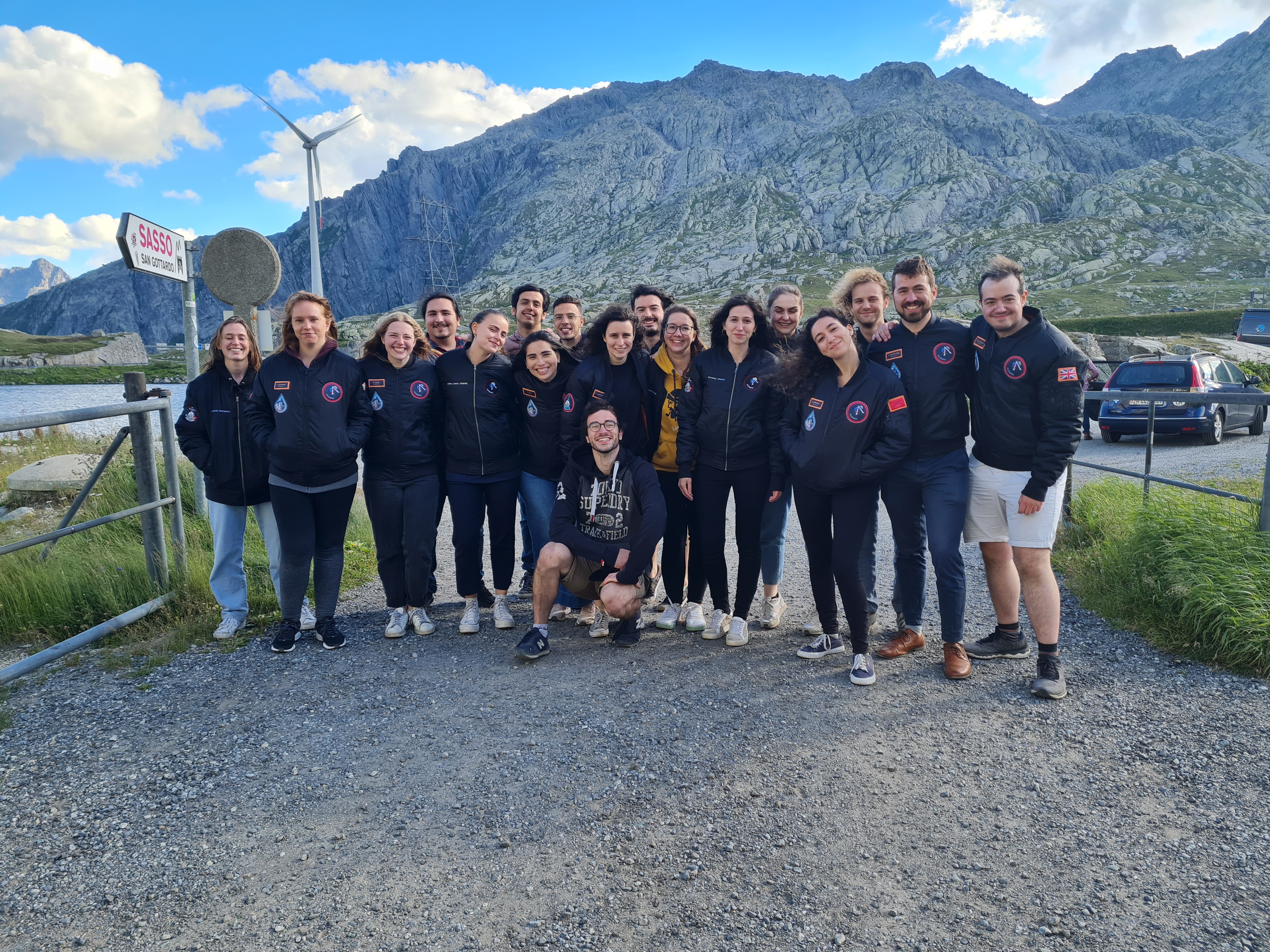
Asclepios II Mission Control Center members at the Sasso San Gottardo site.

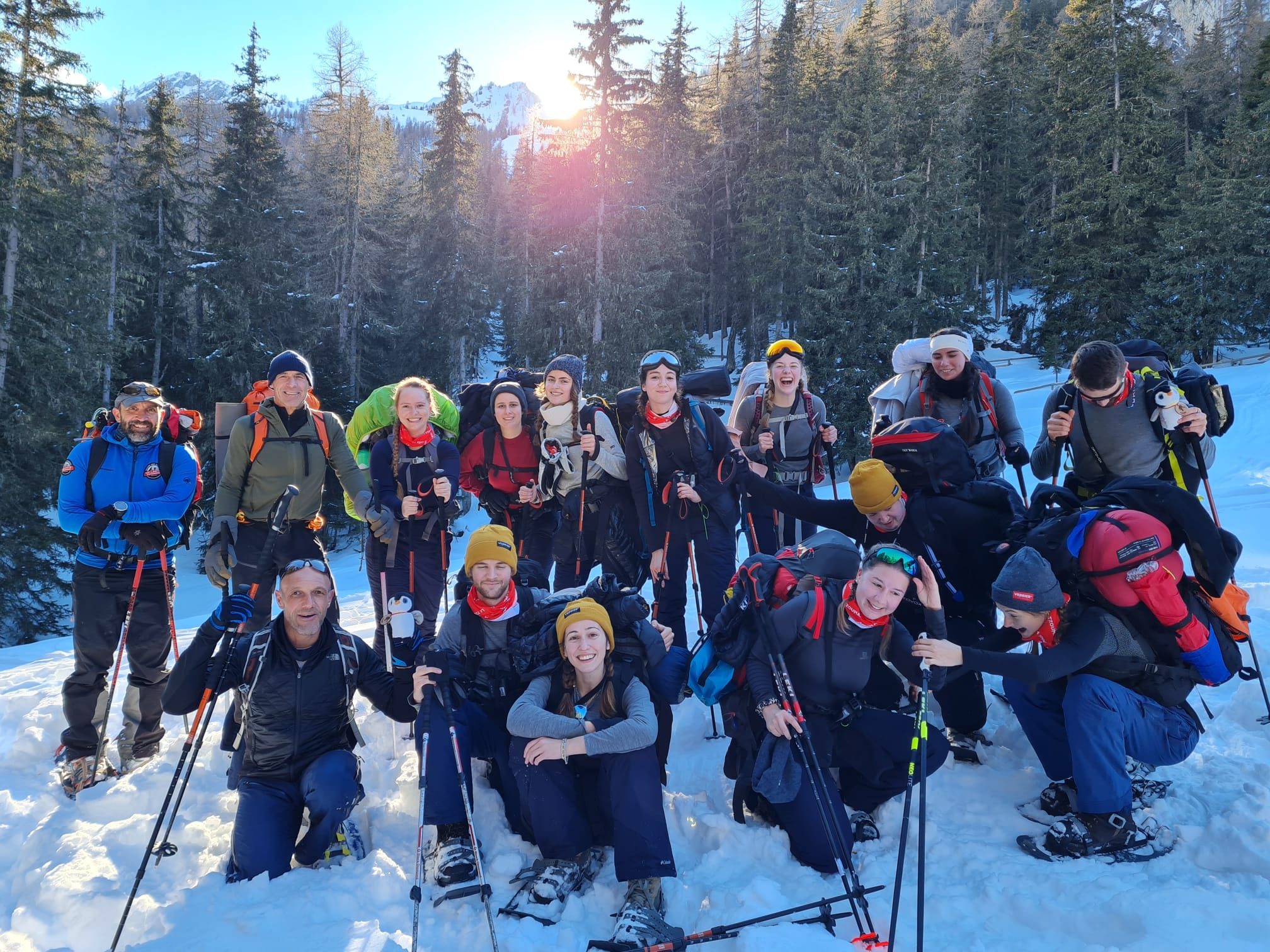
Picture of the Asclepios II team and explorer Mike Horn during the extreme environment training in Verbier.

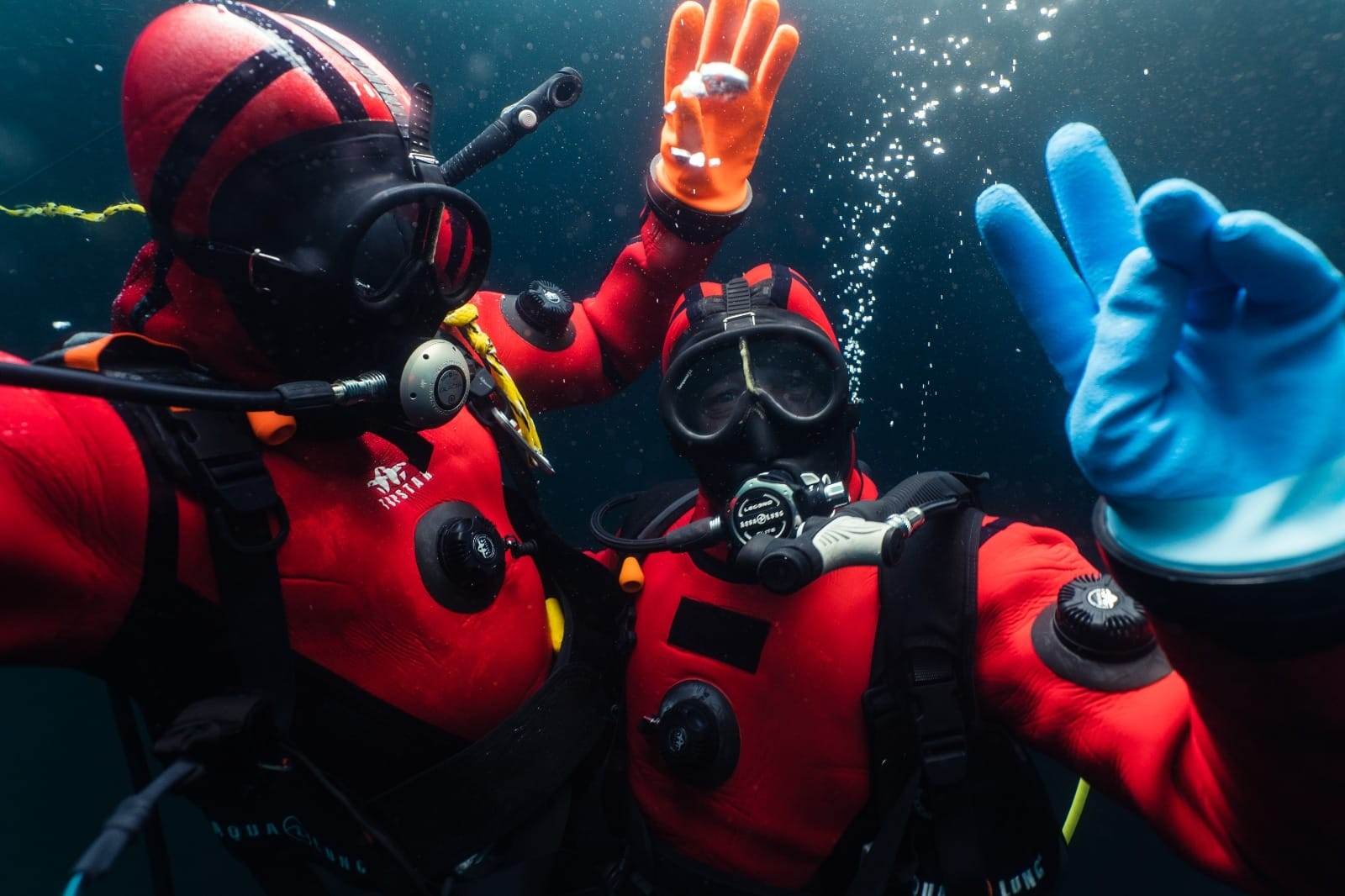
Scuba diving under the ice during the Asclepios II extreme environment training in Verbier with explorer Alban Michon.

=== Asclepios III ===
The Asclepios III mission built on the work of Asclepios II and III as another 14-day mission at Sasso San Gottardo. It was the first of the Asclepios missions to have a particular research focus; in this case, the emphasis was on experiments involving space medicine. Notable research groups involved in the mission were EPFL, the Société Française de Radiologie, MEDES/Spaceship-CNES, the Human Adaptation Institute, TU Berlin, NASA Ames, and the University of Nottingham. Ten astronauts were selected for the third iteration of the Asclepios mission, with six entering the base.

The co-leaders of the Asclepios III mission were as follows:

- Elena López-Contreras González
- Loïc Lerville-Rouyer

The crew was as follows:

- Luke Cullen (United Kingdom), Commander
- Rebecca Blum (United States)
- Baptiste Rubino-Moyner (France)
- Samuel Darmon (Switzerland)
- Palak Patel (United States)
- Marion Dugué (France)
- Max von Horstig (Germany)
- Rocio Valera-Falla (Spain)
- Núria Marília Gonçalves Mendes Moreira (Portugal)
- Pietro Innocenzi (Italy)

=== Asclepios IV ===
The Asclepios IV mission was conducted in July 2024 in Sasso San Gottardo. The research focused on Exploration and Habitat Optimization in Lunar Environments.

The co-leaders of the Asclepios IV mission were as follows:

- Federica Torre
- Clara Nogué i Ansón
- Evandors Theodosiou

The 2024 crew was selected as follows:

- Lillian Tso (United States)
- Antonin Lecomte (France)
- Arthur Grosmaitre (France)
- Danny Cowen (United Kingdom, Malta)
- Davide Scalettari (Italy)
- Guillaume Truong-Alié (France)
- Luca Sportelli (Italy)
- Madelyn Hoying (United States)
- Ilyasse Taame (Morocco)

=== Asclepios V ===
The Asclepios V mission was conducted in July 2025 in Sasso San Gottardo. The research focused on a novel crew rotation model in a lunar base.

The 2025 crew was selected as follows:

- Mateus Magalhaes (Brazil), Commander
- Matthew Acevski (United Kingdom)
- Pedro Rosado (Portugal)
- Ella Ganzer (Germany)
- Max Grossman (United Kingdom)
- Joachim Harding (United Kingdom, Denmark)
- Illina Adhikari (United States, Nepal)
- Nathan Pili (United Kingdom, Italy)
- Lauren Victoria Paulson (United States)

=== Asclepios VI ===
The Asclepios VI mission is planned for July 2026 in Sasso San Gottardo.

The co-leaders of the Asclepios VI mission are as follows:

- Matthew Acevski (President)
- Joseph Hong (Mission Director)
- Ambre Bexter (Mission Director)

The 2026 crew was selected as follows:

- Jack Emmerson (Australia)
- Marvin Urech (Switzerland)
- Marla Welsch (Germany)
- Pritha Jaipal (India)
- Madeleine Monperrus (Sweden)
- Ludwig Sapper (Germany)
- Verdan Deliz (United States, Switzerland)
- Pablo Ibarra (Mexico)
- Ioana Dimitrova (Belgium)
- Andrew Lesh (United States)

== See also ==
- HI-SEAS
- Human mission to Mars
- Mars to Stay
- Psychological and sociological effects of spaceflight
- ISS year-long mission
- List of Mars analogs
