= NASA Exploration Atmosphere Tests =

NASA's Exploration atmosphere missions helping astronauts return to the Moon safely

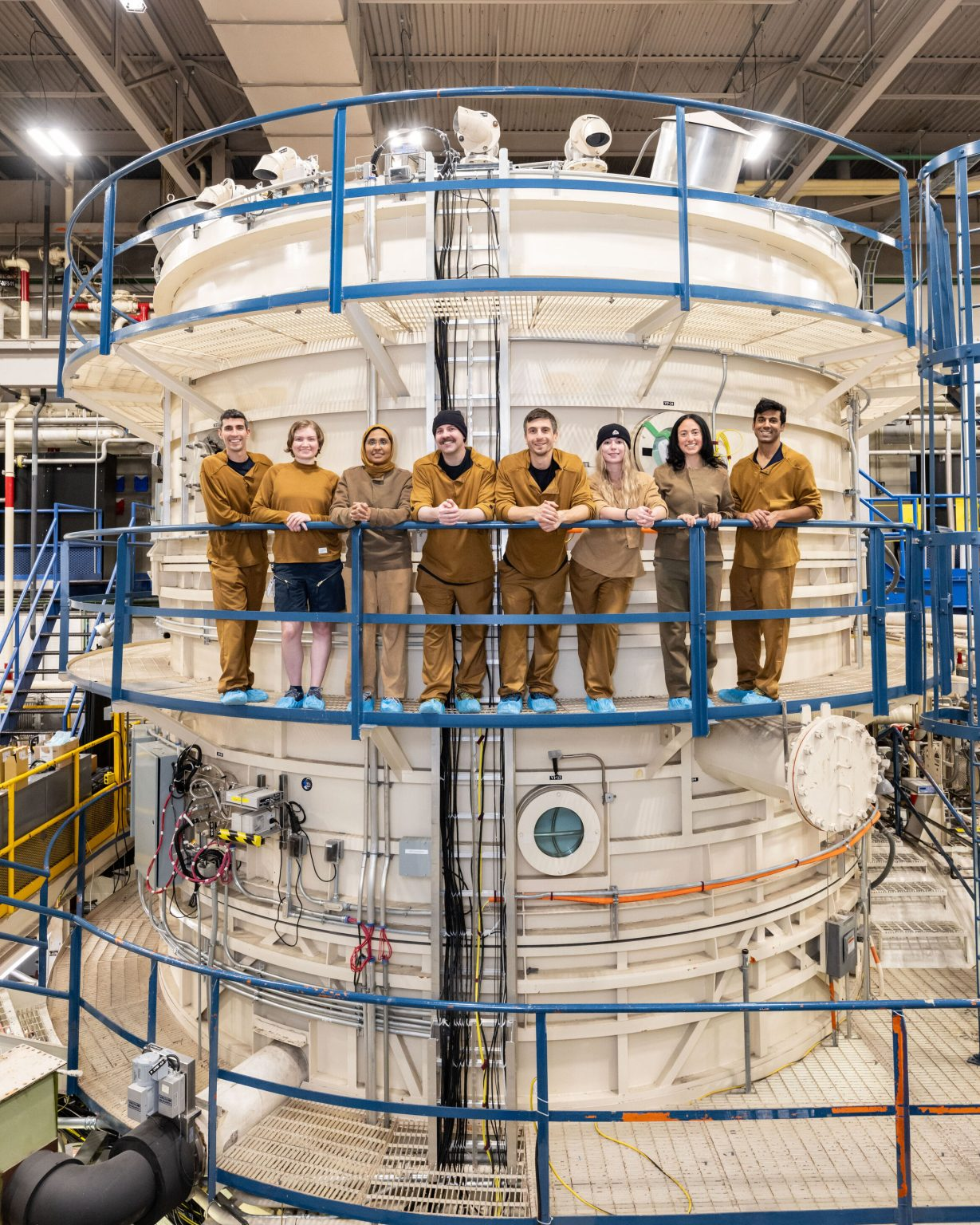
One of the multiple Exploration Atmosphere crew outside the NASA 20-Foot Chamber after the mission.

The NASA Exploration Atmosphere refers to a mission research profile used to study human physiology in spacecraft and surface habitats, designed to support high‑cadence extravehicular activity (EVA), while minimizing decompression sickness (DCS), hypoxia, and flammability risks.

The exploration atmosphere framework is integral to NASA's Artemis Program and future lunar/Martian surface operations, enabling frequent EVA capabilities with lower operational overhead. Ongoing research continues to evaluate alternate atmospheres, variable spacesuit pressures, and physiological effects.

== Background ==
In early crewed missions such as Mercury and Apollo, NASA used low‑pressure (~5 psi), pure‑oxygen cabin atmospheres to simplify life‑support systems. However, post‑Apollo, spacecraft like the Space Shuttle and the International Space Station adopted near‑sea‑level pressures (14.7 psi) with ~21 % O₂, requiring lengthy prebreathe protocols before EVA to mitigate DCS risk.

To reduce EVA delays and consumables, the Exploration Atmospheres Working Group (EAWG) evaluated a habitat atmosphere of 8.0 psia with 32% oxygen, later refined to 8.2 psia and 34% O₂, enabling shorter prebreathe times while maintaining crew safety.

== Decompression sickness considerations ==
DCS arises when nitrogen bubbles form in tissues during a pressure drop, potentially triggering joint pain, neurological symptoms, or worse. To minimize risk, the exploration atmosphere reduces cabin nitrogen levels, combined with abbreviated prebreathe protocols lowering astronaut nitrogen load before EVA. To provide empirical validation of what is predicted to be a safe and effective prebreathe protocol, project human subjects must maintain physical characteristics similar to that of the current astronaut corps.

NASA's Evidence Report emphasizes that new risk-mitigation strategies—such as suit ports, variable-spacesuits, and abbreviated prebreathe protocols—are essential given limitations in emergency medical options during deep-space missions.

== Testing facilities ==
NASA retrofitted the 20‑Foot Chamber at Johnson Space Center (Building 7) to support controlled human exposures to exploration atmospheres. The chamber is a three‑story, human‑rated facility capable of simulating variable atmospheric pressures and compositions. It includes doppler and ultrasound monitoring systems to evaluate DCS physiology over multi‑day studies.

This chamber, originally built in the 1960s for Gemini, Apollo, and Skylab testing, was later used in the 1990s for 30‑ to 90‑day crewed closed-loop life‑support studies to support ISS development.
