= Human Space Flight Centre =

Indian human spaceflight agency

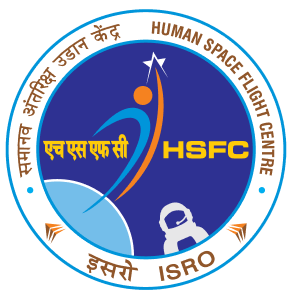

Agency overview
- Formed: 30 January 2019; 7 years ago
- Jurisdiction: Department of Space
- Headquarters: Bengaluru, Karnataka, India
- Annual budget: See the budget of ISRO
- Agency executive: DK Singh
- Parent agency: ISRO
- Website: HSFC Website

The Human Space Flight Centre (HSFC) is a body under ISRO to coordinate the Indian Human Spaceflight Programme. The agency will be responsible for implementation of the Gaganyaan project. The first crewed flight is planned for 2024 on a home-grown LVM3 rocket.

Before Gaganyaan mission announcement in August 2018, human spaceflight was not the priority for ISRO, though most of the required capability for it had been realised. ISRO has already developed most of the technologies for crewed flight and it performed a Crew Module Atmospheric Re-entry Experiment and a Pad Abort Test for the mission. The project will cost less than Rs. 10,000 crore. In December 2018, the government approved further ₹ 100 billion (US$1.5 billion) for a 7-days crewed flight of 3 astronauts to take place in December 2021, later delayed to 2023.

If completed on schedule, India will become world's fourth nation to conduct independent human spaceflight after the Soviet Union/Russia, United States and People's Republic of China. As part of an integrated lunar exploration and outer space strategy, the agency plans to continue working on the Bharatiya Antariksh Station programme, future crewed lunar landings, and moonbase habitat after completing crewed spaceflights.

The Human Space Flight Center's founder is S. Unnikrishnan Nair. The director of Human Space Flight Centre is Dinesh Kumar Singh, Distinguished Scientist.

== History ==
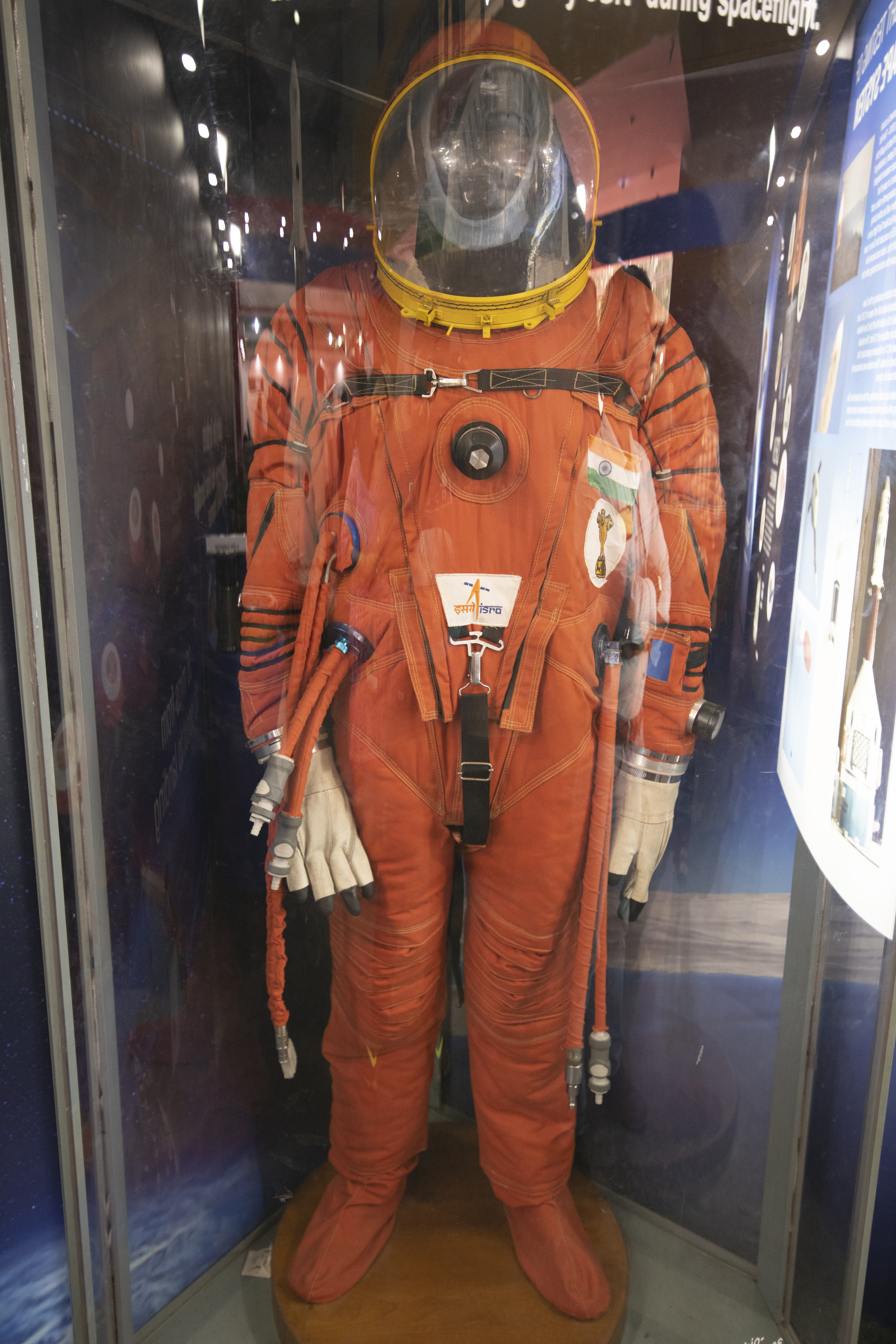
Prototype flight suit for crewed mission

The trials for crewed space missions began in 2007 with the 600 kg Space Capsule Recovery Experiment (SRE), launched using the Polar Satellite Launch Vehicle (PSLV) rocket, and safely returned to earth 12 days later.

The Defence Food Research Laboratory (DFRL) has worked on the space food for crewed spaceflight and has been conducting trials on G-suit for astronauts as well. A prototype 'Advanced Crew Escape Suit' weighing 13 kg was built by Sure Safety (India) Limited based on ISRO's requirements has been tested and performance verified.

On 28 December 2018, the Indian Union cabinet approved the funding for Indian Space Research Organisation's (ISRO's) human spaceflight programme, under which a three-member crew will be sent to space for seven days and is expected to cost Rs 9,023 crore. The testing phase is expected to begin from 2022 and the mission will be undertaken by 2023.

== Spacecraft development ==
Development schedule of Gaganyaan
| Flight type | Proposed month & year | Crew |
|---|---|---|
| Test Flight 1 | June 2022 | None |
| Test Flight 2 | 2023 | None |
| Crewed | 2023 | 3 |

Michael Clark talks about India's Human Spaceflight Programme and the rockets that will enable them.

The first phase of this programme is to develop and fly the 3.7-ton spaceship called Gaganyaan that will carry a 3-member crew to low Earth orbit and safely return to Earth after a mission duration of a few orbits to two days. The first uncrewed launch is planned for 2022. The extendable version of the spaceship will allow flights up to seven days, rendezvous and docking capability.

Enhancements in spacecraft will lead to development of a space habitat allowing spaceflight duration of 30–40 days at once in next phase. Further advances from experience will subsequently lead to development of a space station.

On 7 October 2016, Vikram Sarabhai Space Centre Director K. Sivan stated that ISRO was gearing up to conduct a critical 'crew bailout test' called ISRO Pad Abort Test to see how fast and effectively the crew module could be released safely in the event of an emergency. The tests were conducted successfully on 5 July 2018 at Satish Dhawan Space Centre, Sriharikota. This was the first test in a series of tests to qualify a crew escape system technology.

India will not use any animals for life support systems testing but robots resembling humans will be used. ISRO is targeting more than 99.8% reliability for its crew escape system.

As of August 2018, ISRO plans to launch its crewed orbiter Gaganyaan atop a LVM3 rocket. About 16 minutes after lift-off, the rocket will inject the orbital vehicle into an orbit 300 to 400 km above Earth. The capsule would return for a splashdown in the Arabian Sea near the Gujarat coastline. As of May 2019, design of crew module has been completed. The spacecraft will be flown twice uncrewed for validation before conducting actual human spaceflight.

== Infrastructure development ==
=== Human-Rating of LVM3 ===
Human-rating rates the system is capable of safely transporting humans. ISRO will be building and launching 2 missions to validate the human rating of LVM3. Existing launch facilities will be upgraded to enable them to carry out launches under Indian Human Spaceflight campaign.

=== Escape System ===
The escape system will boast of a recently included geometry. Work on parachute enlargement and new architecture are also going on.

== Astronaut training ==
=== Training for Gaganyaan programme ===
ISRO Chairman, K. Sivan, announced in January 2019 the creation of India's Human Space Flight Centre in Bangalore for training astronauts, also called vyomanauts (vyoma means 'Space' or 'Sky' in Sanskrit). The ₹1,000 crore (US$106.8 million) centre will train the selected astronauts in rescue and recovery operations, operate in zero gravity environment, and monitoring of the radiation environment.

In spring 2009 a full-scale mock-up of the crew capsule was built and delivered to Satish Dhawan Space Centre for training of astronauts. India will be short listing 200 Indian Air Force pilots for this purpose. The selection process would begin by the candidates having to complete an ISRO questionnaire, after which they would be subjected to physical and psychological analyses. Only 4 of the 200 applicants will be selected for the first space mission training. While two will fly, two shall act as reserve.

ISRO signed a memorandum of understanding in 2009 with the Indian Air Force's Institute of Aerospace Medicine (IAM) to conduct preliminary research on psychological and physiological needs of crew and development of training facilities. ISRO is also discussing an agreement with Russia regarding some aspects of astronaut training.

As of January 2020, 4 crews have been selected for the mission with astronaut training scheduled to begin in third week of January.

NASA administrator Bill Nelson visited India in November 2023 and said he was ready to back the country's goal of constructing a commercial space station by 2040, provided that India asked for NASA's assistance. By combining the knowledge and experience of the two nations, this possible collaboration might promote innovation and increase human presence in space between the two parties of Artemis Accords. He stated that during a prior state visit, there was discussion about the Indian proposal to send an astronaut to the International Space Station (ISS).

=== Astronaut Training Facility ===
An astronaut training facility will be established on proposed site of 140 acres (0.57 km^{2}) nearby Kempegowda International Airport in Devanahalli, Karnataka. ISRO has operationalized the baseline astronaut training facility for the Gaganyaan program as of 24 May 2022. It will accommodate theory classes and house three different kinds of simulators. The first is a virtual reality simulator, and the second will replicate different machine interfaces. The crew module simulator will be the last one, featuring internal settings, environmental control and life support (ECLS) systems, and other features. Located close to the Institute of Aerospace Medicine and the ISRO Satellite Integration and Testing Establishment, this facility will be constructed in phases and is situated on a property owned by the U R Rao Satellite Centre.

New equipment along with additional simulators, including static mock-up simulator, dynamic training simulator, and virtual training simulator, were added to the facility as of September 2024. Feedback is being utilized to improve the simulators, which are connected to consoles. Crew modules are available at the training facility for instruction on a variety of subsystems, including bio-toilets, navigation systems, and spaceship operational familiarization. Facilities for yoga and other physical, psychological, and aeromedical training.

For procedural instruction for different activities, a separate training simulator includes control buttons, display systems, and warnings that are comparable to those in the crew module. Virtual training simulations introduce astronauts to the crew module's interior, electronic components, and placements of various components using a virtual reality headset, software, and a handheld controller. Astronauts can examine real-time data that is shown in this simulator and realistically operate the switches and control panels in the crew module. The static mock-up simulator combines multiple elements found in the crew module, including avionics, environment control, and life support. The purpose is to give feel of the crew module by introducing the distance and approach estimates of various controls. The simulator's crew activity spaces will match the real crew module. The dynamic training simulator allows to experience the movements and feelings astronauts will encounter during actual mission. They will receive training to handle jerks, vibrations, acceleration, and shocks during stage separation, parachute deployment, landing, or activation of crew escape system.

Additional facilities for microgravity familiarization and survival training will be available at the Astronaut Training Facility, where astronauts can receive training on how to withstand the harsh conditions of space.

Another advanced facility is proposed to be constructed in Challakere under a ₹2,700 crore (equivalent to ₹35 billion or US$370 million in 2026) plan. It will be a facility spanning 400 acres (1.6 km^{2}) and will be the primary facility for astronaut training and other related activities. As of January 2020, it is planned to be completed in 3 years. Once completed, all activities related to the Indian Human Spaceflight Programme will be undertaken there.

==== Other planned facilities within India ====
In order to provide appropriate interplanetary conditions for astronaut training, Human Space Flight Centre worked with AAKA Space Studio, University of Ladakh, Ladakh Autonomous Hill Development Council, Leh and IIT Bombay on Ladakh Human Analogue Mission (LHAM). This is to understand the challenges that future astronauts might have when venturing beyond of Earth. Hab-1 is a small, inflatable habitat that is part of the mission. In addition to testing life support systems, the expedition will gather biometric data, recreate an extraterrestrial environment, examine circadian lighting, and evaluate human health and endurance in isolation.

== Experiments and objectives ==
On 7 November 2018, ISRO released an Announcement of Opportunity seeking proposals from the Indian science community for microgravity experiments that could be carried out during the first two robotic flights of Gaganyaan. The scope of the experiments is not restricted, and other relevant ideas will be entertained. The proposed orbit for microgravity platform is expected to be in an Earth-bound orbit at approximately 400 km altitude. All the proposed internal and external experimental payloads will undergo thermal, vacuum and radiation tests under required temperature and pressure conditions. To carry out microgravity experiments for long duration, a satellite may be placed in orbit.

== International collaboration ==
On 1 July 2019, Human Space Flight Center and Glavkosmos inked a contract for the medical evaluation, astronaut training, and selection assistance of Indian astronauts for the Gaganyaan mission. The Russian Academy of Sciences' Institute of Biomedical Problems, the Yuri Gagarin Cosmonaut Training Center, and the Federal State Budget Organization will all contribute in the executed contract. An ISRO Technical Liaison Unit (ITLU) will be set up in Moscow to facilitate the development of some key technologies and establishment of special facilities which are essential to support life in space.

Human Space Flight Centre inked a deal with Glavkosmos in October 2019 for Energia to equip the Gaganyaan crew with life support system and supply thermal control system for the spacecraft. In addition to supplying food, water, and oxygen and assisting in regulating body temperature, the life support system will also handle waste products of crew members. Throughout the mission, the thermal control system will maintain the spacecraft's component within permissible temperature limits.

A comprehensive framework for cooperation activities in human space exploration was signed by ISRO and European Space Agency (ESA) on 21 December 2024. It focuses on research projects and astronaut training programs, including access to ESA's facilities on the ISS. Beginning with the Axiom Mission 4, the agreement will be put into effect. Indian astronauts will take part in ESA's technology demonstration projects and human physiological investigations.

== See also ==
- Indian Human Spaceflight Programme
- Indian Space Research Organisation
