= Austrian Space Forum =

Austrian research organization

The Austrian Space Forum (ÖWF) is a non-profit organization based in Innsbruck, Austria. It engages in educational outreach and public science communication, especially aimed at schools and young audiences with an interest in space exploration. Founded in 1999, the association brings together space enthusiasts and professionals from various disciplines who collaborate on Mars analog research and planetary science activities. The forum is particularly known for coordinating field simulations in remote regions, often involving international participants and interdisciplinary teams.

== Missions ==
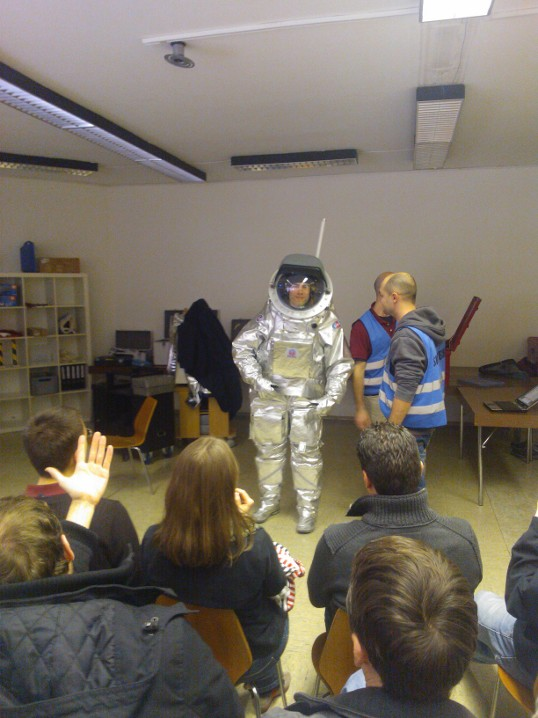
Aouda.X during the Mars2013 dress rehearsal

=== PolAres ===
Between 2007 and 2017, the Austrian Space Forum conducted a series of Mars analogue activities under the "PolAres" program. These efforts included technical and procedural tests for future human-robotic planetary missions. A primary focus was the development and field deployment of the Aouda.X spacesuit simulator, designed to support research in simulated extraterrestrial environments.

=== Rio Tinto Simulation 2011 ===
Mars analogue field simulation in Southern Spain in April 2011, together with international experiments including ESA eurobot vehicle.

=== AMADEE-15 – Kaunertal Glacier mission ===
In 2015, the Austrian Space Forum conducted the AMADEE-15 Mars analogue mission in the Kaunertal glacier region in Austria. The campaign focused on field tests for robotic operations, geoscientific sampling and remote support workflows. Several scientific results were published in peer-reviewed journals, including Acta Astronautica and Icarus.

=== World's biggest analog ===
In 2025, the Austrian Space Forum joined the world's biggest analog. The mission launched in October with coordinating habitats totaling 17 institutions over five continents.

== ADLER-1 cubesat ==
Launched on January 13, 2022, 22:51 UTC, the ADLER-1 cubesat orbits Earth at an altitude of about 500 km to detect space debris with particle sizes "in the micrometer range" for at least one year. The cubesat is 30×10×10 cm by size and was launched with the LauncherOne rocket by Virgin Orbit from California.

The acronym ADLER is composed of Austria Debris Detection Low Earth (Orbit) Reconnoiter. The probe's main instrument, the Austrian Particle Impact Detector (APID), was developed at the OeWF laboratory in Innsbruck. The entire ADLER-1 project cost a larger six-figure euro amount and was privately funded, by Findus Venture GmbH, Austria. The company Spire Global, California contributed its Lemur class small satellite and is responsible for the launch logistics as well as the operation of the small satellite.

== Vertical treadmill facility ==
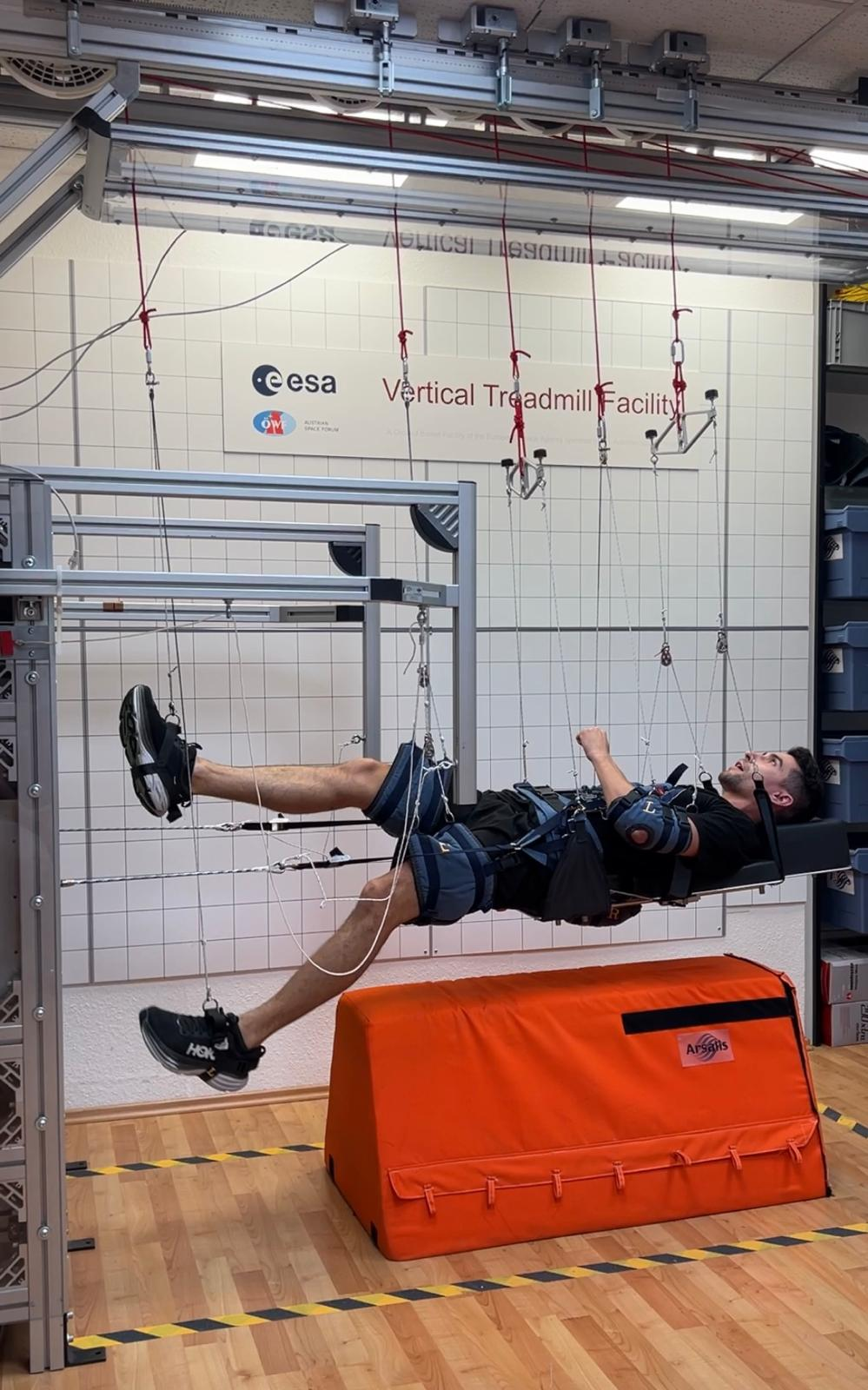
ESA vertical treadmill in Austria

This reduced gravity simulator is a European Space Agency (ESA) ground-based facility operated by the Austrian Space Forum. Originally located at Envihab in operation with the German Aerospace Center DLR, it was used for a movement in low gravity study in 2017. Introduced to ÖWF in 2024, with reserve astronaut Dr. Carmen Possnig, it is the first ESA-designated Ground-Based Facility in Austria. It serves as a unique research platform for investigating human movement and physiological responses in partial or zero-gravity environments, such as those encountered on the Moon, Mars, or the International Space Station (ISS).

The vertical treadmill simulates reduced gravity conditions by suspending a test subject horizontally using a harness and pulley system, then applying a variable pull-down force perpendicular to the vertical treadmill surface. This approach allows researchers to emulate gravity levels from 0 to 1g, making it suitable for studying hypo-gravity locomotion and the physiological impacts of space environments. The treadmill itself can operate at speeds ranging from 0 to 20 km/h and supports subjects weighing up to 110 kg. The entire facility has a mass of 703 kg, including a 450 kg treadmill rack, and is rated for use in parabolic flight campaigns.

== Peer-reviewed publications and conference papers ==
- Inspiring the next generation through the AMADEE-18 MARS analog simulation, Acta Astronautica
- Sub-cm space debris in LEO:A comparison between the ESA MASTER model and ADLER in-situ data, Journal of Space Safety Engineering
- The Relevance of Team Processes for Different Task Characteristics during Performance Episodes and Over Time in Astronaut Crews and Their Support Teams, Journal of Human Performance in Extreme Environments
- Adaptive, empirical models from analog EVA telemetry for traverse pacing and physiological response prediction in astronauts, Acta Astronautica
- Communication quality affects performance of astronauts and support teams through increased workload: Insights from the AMADEE-20 analog Mars mission, Acta Astronautica
- A Technology Demonstration for Astronaut Eye Monitoring: Preliminary Results from Ground Analogs and the International Space Station (ISS), International Astronautical Congress
- Safe Mars Analog Missions, Acta Astronautica
- The AMADEE-20 Robotic Exploration Cascade: An Experience Report, Springer Nature Advances in Service and Industrial Robotics
- Potential Futures in Human Habitation of Martian Lava Tubes, Springer Nature Mars: A Volcanic World
