= University of Ladakh =

University in Ladakh, India

- Motto: March forth
- Type: Public central research university
- Established: 16 December 2018; 7 years ago
- Accreditation: NAAC
- Affiliations: AIU; UGC
- Chancellor: Lieutenant Governor of Ladakh
- Vice-Chancellor: Saket Kushwaha
- Location: Leh, Ladakh, India; 34°23′54″N 75°59′51″E
- Language: Ladakhi, English
- Mascot: Schan
- Website: uol.ac.in

University of Ladakh (UOL), aka Ladakh University, is a public university located in Leh in Leh district of Indian Union territory of Ladakh.

UOL is a cluster university comprising the degree colleges of Leh, Kargil, Nubra Valley, Zanskar, Dras, and Khalatse.

== History ==
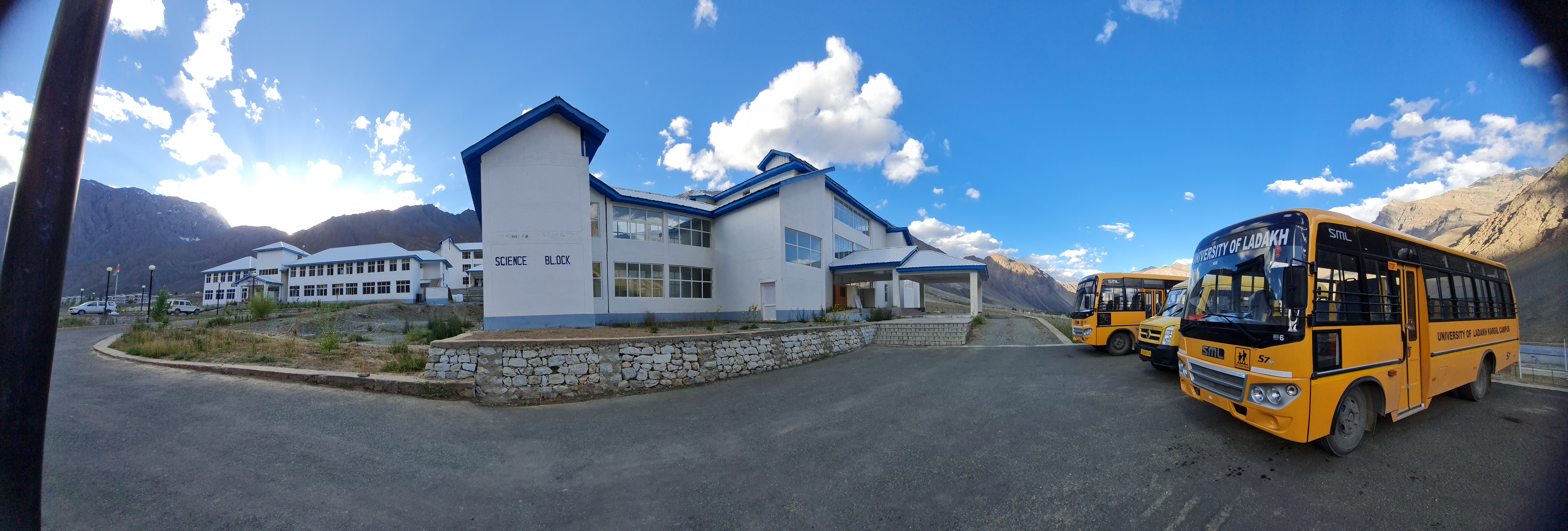
Kargil campus

On 16 December 2018, UOL was established by The University of Ladakh Act, 2018 (Governor Act No. LVI of 2018) of Government of Jammu and Kashmir.

On 5 August 2021, University of Ladakh entered into a Memorandum of Understanding (MoU) with Delhi University to promote scientific and academic collaboration between the two universities. The understanding was expected to help in organising academic workshops, conferences, seminars, and cultural exchanges of mutual interest, organising sporting events in mutual places, and facilitating exchanges of expertise in revising the existing curricular topics so that they can meet the current demands of employment and industry.

On 8 August 2021, University of Ladakh appointed Dr Surinder Kumar Mehta as its Vice-Chancellor for a period of three years.

== See also ==
- Indian Astronomical Observatory
- Sindhu Central University
- Students' Educational and Cultural Movement of Ladakh
