= Ethics of terraforming =

Philosophical debate

The ethics of terraforming has constituted a philosophical debate within biology, ecology, and environmental ethics as to whether terraforming other worlds is an ethical endeavor.

== Support ==
On the pro-terraforming side of the argument, there are those like Robert Zubrin and Richard L. S. Taylor who believe that it is humanity's moral obligation to make other worlds suitable for Terran life, as a continuation of the history of life transforming the environments around it on Earth. They also point out that Earth will eventually be destroyed as nature takes its course, so that humanity faces a long-term choice between terraforming other worlds or allowing all Earth life to become extinct. Dr. Zubrin further argues that even if native microbes have arisen on Mars, for example, the fact that they have not progressed beyond the microbe stage by this point, halfway through the lifetime of the Sun, is a strong indicator that they never will; and that if microbial life exists on Mars, it is likely related to Earth life through a common origin on one of the two planets, which spread to the other as an example of panspermia. Since Mars life would then not be fundamentally unrelated to Earth life, it would not be unique, and competition with such life would not be fundamentally different from competing against microbes on Earth. Zubrin summed up this view:

Some people consider the idea of terraforming Mars heretical—humanity playing God. Yet others would see in such an accomplishment the most profound vindication of the divine nature of the human spirit, exercised in its highest form to bring a dead world to life. My own sympathies are with the latter group. Indeed, I would go farther. I would say that failure to terraform Mars constitutes failure to live up to our human nature and a betrayal of our responsibility as members of the community of life itself. Today, the living biosphere has the potential to expand its reach to encompass a whole new world. Humans, with their intelligence and technology, are the unique means that the biosphere has evolved to allow it to make that land grab, the first among many. Countless beings have lived and died to transform the Earth into a place that could create and allow human existence. Now it's our turn to do our part.

Richard Taylor more succinctly exemplified this point of view with the slogan, "move over microbe".

Some human critics label this argument as an example of anthropocentrism. These critics may view the homocentric view as not only geocentric but short-sighted, and tending to favour human interests to the detriment of ecological systems. They argue that an anthropocentrically driven approach could lead to the extinction of indigenous extraterrestrial life, or interplanetary contamination.

Martyn J. Fogg rebutted these ideas by delineating four potential rationales on which to evaluate the ethics of terraforming—anthropocentrism, zoocentrism, ecocentrism, and preservationism—roughly forming a spectrum from placing the most value on human utility to placing the most value on preserving nature. While concluding that arguments for protecting alien biota can be made from any of these standpoints, he also concludes with an argument, similar to Zubrin's, that strict preservationism is "untenable", since "it assumes that human consciousness, creativity, culture and technology stand outside nature, rather than having been a product of natural selection. If Homo sapiens is the first space faring species to have evolved on Earth, space settlement would not involve acting 'outside nature', but legitimately 'within our nature'."

== Criticism ==
Strong ecocentrists like Richard Sylvan feel there is an intrinsic value to life, and seek to preserve the existence of native lifeforms. This idea is usually referred to as biocentrism. In response to these objections, weak anthropocentrism incorporates biocentric ethics, allowing for various degrees of terraforming.

Christopher McKay strikes a position between these two, what may be termed weak ecocentrism, proposing that an entire biosphere of alien life, even if only microbial life, has far more value than individual microbes, and should not be subject to interference by Earth life. However, he also proposed that it would be valuable and desirable to terraform a planet to nurture the alien life, to allow it to thrive as well as to exhibit a broader range of behavior for scientific study, and that such activity is ultimately justified by the utilitarian value to humans of being able to study and appreciate the still somewhat undisturbed alien life. McKay put his views in these words:

If we discover living or dormant organisms on Mars and these forms represent a different type of life than the life we have on Earth, then we should not bring life from Earth to Mars. Instead, we should alter the Martian environment so that this native Martian life can expand to fill a planetary scale biosphere. [...] [I]t is essential to maintain the categorical distinction between killing individual microorganisms and extinguishing an entire alternative system of life. There is no logical argument against killing microorganisms per se, either for research, medical, sanitary, or even casual reasons. However [...] it does not logically follow that destroying or displacing the first example of life beyond Earth is acceptable if the only examples of that life are microscopic. [...] If we terraformed Mars to allow the expansion of that life we would then reap the maximum benefits from the scientific study of that life form and its development into a full scale global biosphere. We would also enjoy the educational and [aesthetic] benefits of life in a biologically richer solar system.

Even this "help" would be seen as a type of terraforming to the strictest of ecocentrists, who would say that all life has the right, in its home biosphere, to evolve at its own pace as well as its own direction, free of any outside interference. The impact of the human species on otherwise untouched worlds and the possible interference with or elimination of alien life forms are good reasons to leave these other worlds in their natural states; this is an example of a strong biocentric view, or object-centered ethic. Critics claim this is a form of anti-humanism and they assert that rocks and bacteria can not have rights, nor should the discovery of alien life prevent terraforming from occurring.

Pragmatists argue that humanity on other planets is sociologically impractical. The basis is that being on another planet would not change human nature, so it would not be long until pollution and destruction by humankind began, and on a planet that has probably only known peace since its formation. Since life on Earth will ultimately be destroyed by planetary impacts or the red giant phase of the Sun, all native species will perish if not allowed to move to other objects.

Some advocates of animal welfare have pointed out the ethical issues associated with spreading Earth-based wild-animal life by terraforming. In particular, they claim it may be ethically objectionable to bring into existence large numbers of animals that suffer greatly during their often short lives in the wild. There are also concerns that even with full terraformation, distinct differences between Earth and Mars, such as gravity, lengths of the day and night cycles, and differing/lacking magnetic fields, would cause harm to many introduced species that have evolved for millions of years under Earth conditions. Though some species may survive, and others possibly could be adapted through genetic modification, if the introduced species were isolated on Mars and not frequently interbred with Earth counterparts, the species would eventually evolve through many generations in order to better suit their new environment, possibly leading to different evolutionary lines. Thus, the introduced life may eventually look and act different from their Earthly counterparts and/or ancestors.

Another aspect of terraforming ethics deals with an opposing extreme in this debate. Terraforming could be seen as a potential waste of precious materials, in light of alternative uses. Critics believe that it would constrict the growth potential of humanity by encapsulating the material inside of an astronomical object. Once the surface is terraformed and people have taken residence there, all the interior material is needed to sustain the maximum gravity potential for those inhabitants. If all of the material were utilized to produce space habitation systems, a much greater number of lives would then be supported.

== Future prospects ==
The contrasts between these arguments are fully explored in the field of environmental ethics. Debates often focus on how much time and effort should be expended on investigating the possibility of any microscopic life on a planet before deciding whether to terraform, and what level of sophistication or chances for future development alien life would deserve varying levels of commitment to non-interference. Such debates have been engaged in live, between Zubrin and McKay and others, at various conferences of the Mars Society, which has made written and video records of the debates available. For example, a written account of some of these debates is available in On to Mars: Colonizing a New World, as a joint article, "Do Indigenous Martian Bacteria have Precedence over Human Exploration?" (pp. 177–182)

== Ethics of terraforming in fiction ==
A fairly thorough non-fictional analysis of the ethics of terraforming is also presented under the guise of the fictional Mars trilogy by Kim Stanley Robinson, particularly between the characters Ann Clayborne and Sax Russell, with Clayborne epitomizing an ecocentric ethic of non-interference and Russell embodying the anthropocentric belief in the virtue of terraforming. The idea of interplanetary colonization and its ethical implications are also explored by C.S. Lewis in the first book of his Space Trilogy Out of the Silent Planet published in 1938.

The plot of the 1982 film Star Trek II: The Wrath of Khan is based around the use of the so-called "Genesis Device" to create the conditions and organic building-blocks for life on previously lifeless planets. In debating the ethics of the device, Dr. McCoy, Spock and Admiral Kirk reflect on the Device's ability to replace any existing lifeforms with "its new matrix". McCoy describes the ethics of the Device in the following terms: "According to myth, the Earth was created in six days. Now watch out - here comes Genesis! We'll do it for you in six minutes!" The technology is shown to be flawed in the 1984 sequel, Star Trek III: The Search for Spock.

Star Trek: The Next Generation dealt with terraforming. In the episode "Home Soil", terraformers are causing harm to the native lifeforms on Velara III, with disastrous consequences.

In the novel Revelation Space by Alastair Reynolds, there was a political dispute in the human colony of a fictional planet called Resurgam between a faction who were in support of terraforming the planet and another faction of archeologists who were against terraforming due to the discovery of the remains of an extinct alien civilisation on the planet and due to the fear that any attempt to terraform the planet would destroy the valuable artifacts that still might be buried underground.

The ethics of terraforming, as well as deep space colonization, are recurring themes in Firefly, in which they are compared to the issues of expansionism and imperialism in the American Old West.

In The Outer Worlds, the moon of Monarch is a planet that is improperly terraformed, which leads to the native fauna becoming bigger and more dangerous.

== See also ==
- Space ethics
- Suffering risks
