= Islands in the Sky: Bold New Ideas for Colonizing Space =

1996 essay collection edited by Stanley Schmidt and Robert Zubrin

Islands in the Sky: Bold New Ideas for Colonizing Space (Stanley Schmidt and Robert Zubrin, eds., Wiley, 1996, ISBN 0-471-13561-5) is an anthology of non-fiction articles on space colonization, several contributed by leading researchers in the field.

The articles vary in technical depth, ranging from accessible overviews to rigorous treatments that derive results through calculus. Their subject matter spans colonization of the inner and outer Solar System, interstellar colonization, novel applications of established engineering principles, and speculative physics theories. Five of the articles were authored or co-authored by Zubrin; other notable contributors include Robert L. Forward, Martyn J. Fogg, and Christopher McKay.

The collection is particularly notable for including an early publication of Robert Zubrin's Mars Direct mission architecture, first formulated in 1990. That proposal was subsequently expanded into the book The Case for Mars: The Plan to Settle the Red Planet and Why We Must and provided the impetus for the founding of the Mars Society.

== Contents ==
- Introduction — Stanley Schmidt
- Part One: Breaking the Bonds of the Earth
  - "Comes the Revolution...", G. Harry Stine
  - "The Hypersonic Skyhook", Robert Zubrin
- Part Two: Stepping Into the Solar System
  - "Mars Direct: A Proposal for the Rapid Exploration and Colonization of the Red Planet", Robert Zubrin and David A. Baker
  - "Inward Ho!", Stephen L. Gillett
  - "Colonizing the Outer Solar System", Robert Zubrin
  - "Islands in the Sky: Human Exploration and Settlement of the Oort Cloud", Richard P. Terra
  - "Alien Life Between Here and the Stars", Robert L. Forward
- Part Three: Creating New Worlds
  - "Terraforming Mars", Robert Zubrin and Christopher P. McKay
  - "A Planet Dweller's Dreams", Martyn J. Fogg
  - "Astrophysical Engineering and the Fate of the Earth", Martyn J. Fogg
- Part Four: Advanced Drives and Interstellar Travel
  - "To the Stars!", Gordon R. Woodcock
  - "The Magnetic Sail", Robert Zubrin
  - "The Tachyon Drive: Infinite Exhaust Velocity at Zero Energy Cost", John G. Cramer
  - "The Negative Matter Space Drive", Robert L. Forward
  - "The Economics of Interstellar Commerce", Warren Salomon
