= Interplanetary contamination =

Biological contamination of a planetary body by a space probe or spacecraft

Interplanetary contamination refers to biological contamination of a planetary body by a space probe or spacecraft, either deliberate or unintentional.

There are two types of interplanetary contamination:

- Forward contamination is the transfer of life and other forms of contamination from Earth to another celestial body.
- Back contamination is the introduction of extraterrestrial organisms and other forms of contamination into Earth's biosphere. It also covers infection of humans and human habitats in space and on other celestial bodies by extraterrestrial organisms, if such organisms exist.

The main focus is on microbial life and on potentially invasive species. Non-biological forms of contamination have also been considered, including contamination of sensitive deposits (such as lunar polar ice deposits) of scientific interest. In the case of back contamination, multicellular life is thought unlikely but has not been ruled out. In the case of forward contamination, contamination by multicellular life (e.g. lichens) is unlikely to occur for robotic missions, but it becomes a consideration in crewed missions to Mars.

Current space missions are governed by the Outer Space Treaty and the COSPAR guidelines for planetary protection. Forward contamination is prevented primarily by sterilizing the spacecraft. In the case of sample-return missions, the aim of the mission is to return extraterrestrial samples to Earth, and sterilization of the samples would make them of much less interest. So, back contamination would be prevented mainly by containment, and breaking the chain of contact between the planet of origin and Earth. It would also require quarantine procedures for the materials and for anyone who comes into contact with them.

== Overview ==
Most of the Solar System appears hostile to life as we know it. No extraterrestrial life has ever been discovered. But if extraterrestrial life exists, it may be vulnerable to interplanetary contamination by foreign microorganisms. Some extremophiles may be able to survive space travel to another planet, and foreign life could possibly be introduced by spacecraft from Earth. If possible, some believe this poses scientific and ethical concerns.

Locations within the Solar System where life might exist today include the oceans of liquid water beneath the icy surface of Europa, Enceladus, and Titan (its surface has oceans of liquid ethane / methane, but it may also have liquid water below the surface and ice volcanoes).

There are multiple consequences for both forward- and back-contamination. If a planet becomes contaminated with Earth life, it might then be difficult to tell whether any lifeforms discovered originated there or came from Earth. Furthermore, the organic chemicals produced by the introduced life would confuse sensitive searches for biosignatures of living or ancient native life. The same applies to other more complex biosignatures. Life on other planets could have a common origin with Earth life, since in the early Solar System there was much exchange of material between the planets which could have transferred life as well. If so, it might be based on nucleic acids too (RNA or DNA).

The majority of the species isolated are not well understood or characterized and cannot be cultured in labs, and are known only from DNA fragments obtained with swabs. On a contaminated planet, it might be difficult to distinguish the DNA of extraterrestrial life from the DNA of life brought to the planet by the exploring. Most species of microorganisms on Earth are not yet well understood or DNA sequenced. This particularly applies to the unculturable archaea, and so are difficult to study. This can be either because they depend on the presence of other microorganisms, are slow growing, or depend on other conditions not yet understood. In typical habitats, 99% of microorganisms are not culturable. Introduced Earth life could contaminate resources of value for future human missions, such as water.

Invasive species could outcompete native life or consume it, if there is life on the planet. Species on Earth moved from one continent to another can outcompete the native life adapted to that continent. Additionally, evolutionary processes on Earth might have developed biological pathways different from extraterrestrial organisms, and so may be able to outcompete it. The same is also possible the other way around for contamination introduced to Earth's biosphere.

In addition to science research concerns, there are also attempts to raise ethical and moral concerns regarding intentional or unintentional interplanetary transport of life.

== Evidence for possible habitats outside Earth ==
Enceladus and Europa show the best evidence for current habitats, mainly due to the possibility of their hosting liquid water and organic compounds.

=== Mars ===
There is ample evidence to suggest that Mars once offered habitable conditions for microbial life. It is therefore possible that microbial life may have existed on Mars, although no evidence has been found.

It is thought that many bacterial spores (endospores) from Earth were transported on Mars spacecraft. Some may be protected within Martian rovers and landers on the shallow surface of the planet. In that sense, Mars may have already been contaminated.

Certain lichens from the arctic permafrost are able to photosynthesize and grow in the absence of any liquid water, simply by using the humidity from the atmosphere. They are also highly tolerant of UV radiation, using melanin and other more specialized chemicals to protect their cells.

Although numerous studies point to resistance to some of Mars conditions, they do so separately, and none have considered the full range of Martian surface conditions, including temperature, pressure, atmospheric composition, radiation, humidity, oxidizing regolith, and others, all at the same time and in combination. Laboratory simulations show that whenever multiple lethal factors are combined, the survival rates plummet quickly.

Other studies have suggested the potential for life to survive using deliquescing salts. These, similarly to the lichens, use the humidity of the atmosphere. If the mixture of salts is right, the organisms may obtain liquid water at times of high atmospheric humidity, with salts capturing enough to be capable of supporting life.

Research published in July 2017 shows that when irradiated with a simulated Martian UV flux, perchlorates become even more lethal to bacteria (bactericide effect). Even dormant spores lost viability within minutes. In addition, two other compounds of the Martian surface, iron oxides and hydrogen peroxide, act in synergy with irradiated perchlorates to cause a 10.8-fold increase in cell death when compared to cells exposed to UV radiation after 60 seconds of exposure. It was also found that abraded silicates (quartz and basalt) lead to the formation of toxic reactive oxygen species. The researchers concluded that "the surface of Mars is lethal to vegetative cells and renders much of the surface and near-surface regions uninhabitable." This research demonstrates that the present-day surface is more uninhabitable than previously thought, and reinforces the notion to inspect at least a few meters into the ground to ensure the levels of radiation would be relatively low.

=== Enceladus ===
The Cassini spacecraft directly sampled the plumes escaping from Enceladus. Measured data indicates that these geysers are made primarily of salt rich particles with an 'ocean-like' composition, which is thought to originate from a subsurface ocean of liquid saltwater, rather than from the moon's icy surface. Data from the geyser flythroughs also indicate the presence of organic chemicals in the plumes. Heat scans of Enceladus's surface also indicate higher temperatures around the fissures where the geysers originate, with temperatures reaching −93 °C (−135 °F), which is 115 °C (207 °F) warmer than the surrounding surface regions.

=== Europa ===
Europa has much indirect evidence for its sub-surface ocean. Models of how Europa is affected by tidal heating require a subsurface layer of liquid water in order to accurately reproduce the linear fracturing of the surface. Indeed, observations by the Galileo spacecraft of how Europa's magnetic field interacts with Jupiter's field strengthens the case for a liquid, rather than solid, layer; an electrically conductive fluid deep within Europa would explain these results. Observations from the Hubble Space Telescope in December 2012 appear to show an ice plume spouting from Europa's surface, which would immensely strengthen the case for a liquid subsurface ocean. As was the case for Enceladus, vapour geysers would allow for easy sampling of the liquid layer. Unfortunately, there appears to be little evidence that geysering is a frequent event on Europa due to the lack of water in the space near Europa.

== Planetary protection ==
Forward contamination is prevented by sterilizing space probes sent to sensitive areas of the Solar System. Missions are classified depending on whether their destinations are of interest for the search for life, and whether there is any chance that Earth life could reproduce there.

NASA made these policies official with the issuing of Management Manual NMI-4-4-1, NASA Unmanned Spacecraft Decontamination Policy on September 9, 1963. Prior to NMI-4-4-1 the same sterilization requirements were required on all outgoing spacecraft regardless of their target. Difficulties in the sterilization of Ranger probes sent to the Moon are the primary reasons for NASA's change to a target-by-target basis in assessing the likelihood forward contamination.

Some destinations such as Mercury need no precautions at all. Others such as the Moon require documentation but nothing more, while destinations such as Mars require sterilization of the rovers sent there.

Back contamination would be prevented by containment or quarantine. However, there have been no sample-returns thought to have any possibility of a back contamination risk since the Apollo missions. The Apollo regulations have been rescinded and new regulations have yet to be developed. See suggested precautions for sample-returns.

== Crewed spacecraft ==
Crewed spacecraft are of particular concern for interplanetary contamination because of the impossibility to sterilize a human to the same level as a robotic spacecraft. Therefore, the chance of forwarding contamination is higher than for a robotic mission. Humans are typically host to a hundred trillion microorganisms in ten thousand species in the human microbiome which cannot be removed while preserving the life of the human. Containment seems the only option, but effective containment to the same standard as a robotic rover appears difficult to achieve with present-day technology. In particular, adequate containment in the event of a hard landing is a major challenge.

Human explorers may be potential carriers back to Earth of microorganisms acquired on Mars, if such microorganisms exist. Another issue is the contamination of the water supply by Earth microorganisms shed by humans in their stools, skin and breath, which could have a direct effect on the long-term human colonization of Mars.

Historical examples of measures taken to prevent planetary contamination of the moon include the inclusion of an anti-bacterial filter in the Apollo Lunar Module, from Apollo 13 and onward. This was placed on the cabin relief valve in order to prevent contaminants from the cabin being released into the lunar environment during the depressurization of the crew compartment, prior to EVA.

== The Moon ==
The Apollo missions incited public concern about the possibility of microbes on the Moon, creating fears about a plague being brought to Earth when the astronauts returned. NASA received thousands of letters from Americans concerned with the potential for back contamination.

=== As a testbed ===
The Moon has been suggested as a testbed for new technology to protect sites in the Solar System, and astronauts, from forward and back contamination. Currently, the Moon has no contamination restrictions because it is considered to be "not of interest" for prebiotic chemistry and origins of life. Analysis of the contamination left by the Apollo program astronauts could also yield useful ground truth for planetary protection models.

== Non-contaminating exploration methods ==
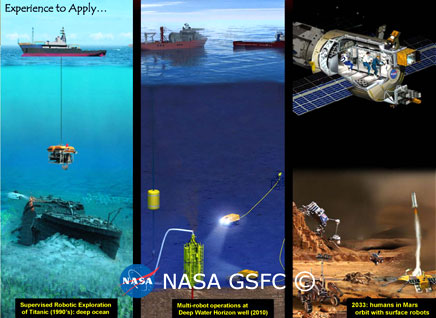
Telerobotics exploration on Mars and Earth

One of the most reliable ways to reduce the risk of forward and back contamination during visits to extraterrestrial bodies is to use only robotic spacecraft. Humans in close orbit around the target planet could control equipment on the surface in real time via telepresence, so bringing many of the benefits of a surface mission, without its associated increased forward and back contamination risks.

== Back contamination issues ==
Since the Moon is now generally considered to be free from life, the most likely source of contamination would be from Mars during either a Mars sample-return mission or as a result of a crewed mission to Mars. The possibility of new human pathogens, or environmental disruption due to back contamination, is considered to be of extremely low probability but cannot yet be ruled out.

NASA and ESA are actively developing a Mars Sample Return Program to return samples collected by the Perseverance Rover to Earth. The European Space Foundation report cites many advantages of a Mars sample-return. In particular, it would permit extensive analyses on Earth, without the size and weight constraints for instruments sent to Mars on rovers. These analyses could also be carried out without the communication delays for experiments carried out by Martian rovers. It would also make it possible to repeat experiments in multiple laboratories with different instruments to confirm key results.

Carl Sagan was first to publicise back contamination issues that might follow from a Mars sample-return. In Cosmic Connection (1973) he wrote:

Precisely because Mars is an environment of great potential biological interest, it is possible that on Mars there are pathogens, organisms which, if transported to the terrestrial environment, might do enormous biological damage.

Later in Cosmos (1980) Carl Sagan wrote:

Perhaps Martian samples can be safely returned to Earth. But I would want to be very sure before considering a returned-sample mission.

NASA and ESA views are similar. The findings were that with present-day technology, Martian samples can be safely returned to Earth provided the right precautions are taken.

=== Suggested precautions for sample-returns ===
NASA has already had experience with returning samples thought to represent a low back contamination risk when samples were returned for the first time by Apollo 11. At the time, it was thought that there was a low probability of life on the Moon, so the requirements were not very stringent. The precautions taken then were inadequate by current standards, however. The regulations used then have been rescinded, and new regulations and approaches for a sample-return would be needed.

==== Chain of contact ====
A sample-return mission would be designed to break the chain of contact between Mars and the exterior of the sample container, for instance, by sealing the returned container inside another larger container in the vacuum of space before it returns to Earth. In order to eliminate the risk of parachute failure, the capsule could fall at terminal velocity and the impact would be cushioned by the capsule's thermal protection system. The sample container would be designed to withstand the force of the impact.

==== Receiving facility ====
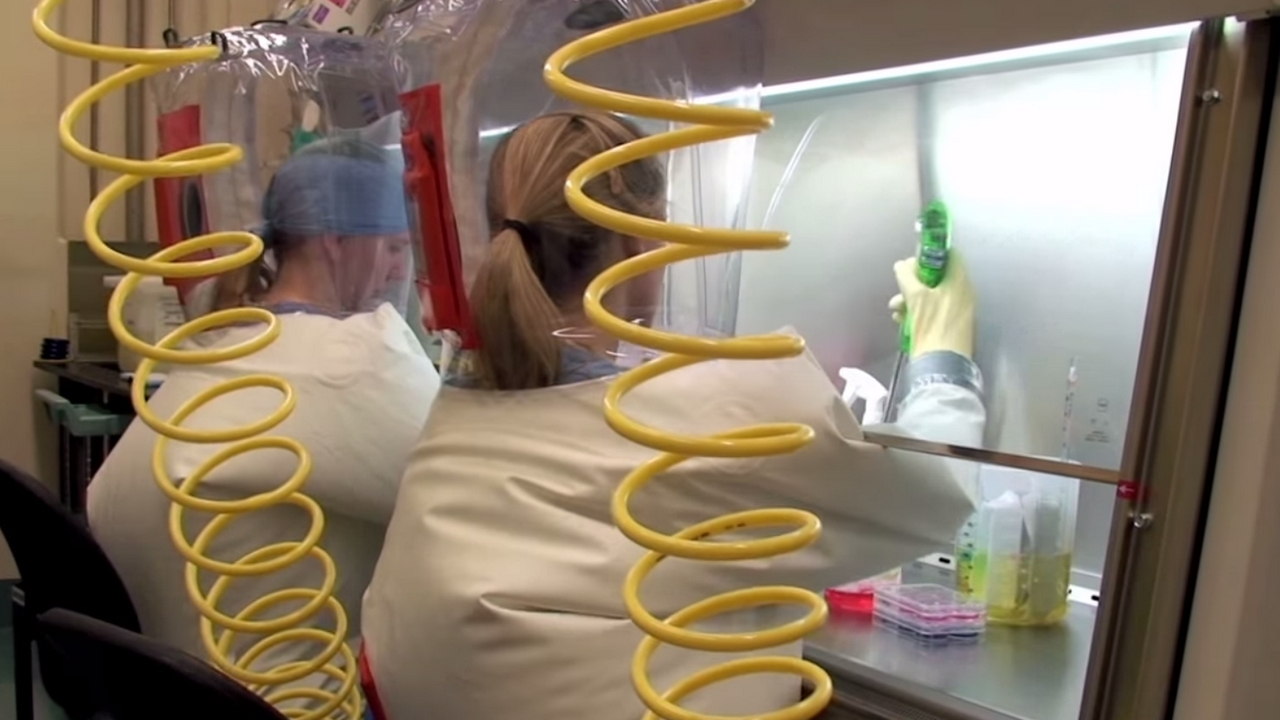
Working inside a BSL-4 laboratory with air hoses providing positive air pressure to their suits

To receive, analyze and curate extraterrestrial soil samples, NASA has proposed to build a biohazard containment facility, tentatively known as the Mars Sample Return Receiving Facility (MSRRF). This future facility must be rated biohazard level 4 (BSL-4). While existing BSL-4 facilities deal primarily with fairly well-known organisms, a BSL-4 facility focused on extraterrestrial samples must pre-plan the systems carefully while being mindful that there will be unforeseen issues during sample evaluation and curation that will require independent thinking and solutions.

The facility's systems must be able to contain unknown biohazards, as the sizes of any putative Martian microorganisms are unknown. In consideration of this, additional requirements were proposed. Ideally it should filter particles of 0.01 μm or larger, and release of a particle 0.05 μm or larger is unacceptable under any circumstance.

The reason for this extremely small size limit of 0.01 μm is for consideration of gene transfer agents (GTAs) which are virus-like particles that are produced by some microorganisms that package random segments of DNA capable of horizontal gene transfer. These randomly incorporate segments of the host genome and can transfer them to other evolutionarily distant hosts, and do that without killing the new host. In this way many archaea and bacteria can swap DNA with each other. This raises the possibility that Martian life, if it has a common origin with Earth life in the distant past, could swap DNA with Earth microorganisms in the same way. In one experiment reported in 2010, researchers left GTAs (DNA conferring antibiotic resistance) and marine bacteria overnight in natural conditions and found that by the next day up to 47% of the bacteria had incorporated the genetic material from the GTAs. Another reason for the 0.05 μm limit is because of the discovery of ultramicrobacteria as small as 0.2 μm across.

The BSL-4 containment facility must also double as a cleanroom to preserve the scientific value of the samples. A challenge is that, while it is relatively easy to simply contain the samples once returned to Earth, researchers would also want to remove parts of the sample and perform analyses. During all these handling procedures, the samples would need to be protected from Earthly contamination. A cleanroom is normally kept at a higher pressure than the external environment to keep contaminants out, while a biohazard laboratory is kept at a lower pressure to keep the biohazards in. This would require compartmentalizing the specialized rooms in order to combine them in a single building. Solutions suggested include a triple walled containment facility, and extensive robotic handling of the samples.

The facility would be expected to take 7 to 10 years from design to completion, and an additional two years recommended for the staff to become accustomed to the facilities.

==== Dissenting views on back contamination ====
Robert Zubrin, from the Mars Society, maintains that the risk of back contamination is negligible. He supports this using an argument based on the possibility of transfer of life from Earth to Mars on meteorites.

==== Legal process of approval for Mars sample-return ====
Margaret Race has examined in detail the legal process of approval for a MSR. She found that under the National Environmental Policy Act (NEPA) (which did not exist in the Apollo era), a formal environment impact statement is likely to be required, and public hearings during which all the issues would be aired openly. This process is likely to take up to several years to complete.

During this process, she found, the full range of worst accident scenarios, impact, and project alternatives would be played out in the public arena. Other agencies such as the Environment Protection Agency, Occupational Health and Safety Administration, etc., might also get involved in the decision-making process.

The laws on quarantine would also need to be clarified as the regulations for the Apollo program were rescinded. In the Apollo era, NASA delayed announcement of its quarantine regulations until the day Apollo was launched, bypassing the requirement for public debate - something that would likely not be tolerated today.

It is also probable that the presidential directive NSC-25 would apply, requiring a review of large scale alleged effects on the environment to be carried out subsequent to other domestic reviews and through a long process, leading eventually to presidential approval of the launch.

Apart from those domestic legal hurdles, there would be numerous international regulations and treaties to be negotiated in the case of a Mars sample-return, especially those relating to environmental protection and health. Race concluded that the public of necessity has a significant role to play in the development of the policies governing Mars sample-return.

=== Alternatives to sample-returns ===
Several exobiologists have suggested that a Mars sample-return is not necessary at this stage, and that it is better to focus more on in situ studies on the surface first. Although it is not their main motivation, this approach of course also eliminates back contamination risks.

Some of these exobiologists advocate more in situ studies followed by a sample-return in the near future. Others go as far as to advocate in situ study instead of a sample-return at the present state of understanding of Mars.

Their reasoning is that life on Mars is likely to be hard to find. Any present day life is likely to be sparse and occur in only a few niche habitats. Past life is likely to be degraded by cosmic radiation over geological time periods if exposed in the top few meters of the Mars surface. Also, only certain special deposits of salts or clays on Mars would have the capability to preserve organics for billions of years. So, they argue, there is a high risk that a Mars sample-return at our current stage of understanding would return samples that are no more conclusive about the origins of life on Mars or present day life than the Martian meteorite samples we already have.

Another consideration is the difficulty of keeping the sample completely free from Earth life contamination during the return journey and during handling procedures on Earth. This might make it hard to show conclusively that any biosignatures detected does not result from contamination of the samples.

Instead they advocate sending more sensitive instruments on Mars surface rovers. These could examine many different rocks and soil types, and search for biosignatures on the surface and so examine a wide range of materials which could not all be returned to Earth with current technology at reasonable cost.

A sample-return to Earth would then be considered at a later stage, once we have a reasonably thorough understanding of conditions on Mars, and possibly have already detected life there, either current or past life, through biosignatures and other in situ analyses.

==== Instruments under development for in situ analyses ====
- NASA Marshall Space Flight Center is leading a research effort to develop a Miniaturized Variable Pressure Scanning Electron Microscope (MVP-SEM) for future lunar and Martian missions.
- Several teams, including Jonathan Rothberg, and J. Craig Venter, are separately developing solutions for sequencing alien DNA directly on the Martian surface itself.
- Levin is working on updated versions of the Labeled Release instrument flown on Viking. For instance versions that rely on detecting chirality. This is of special interest because it can enable detection of life even if it is not based on standard life chemistry.
- The Urey Mars Organic and Oxidant Detector instrument for detection of biosignatures has been descoped, but was due to be flown on ExoMars in 2018. It is designed with much higher levels of sensitivity for biosignatures than any previous instruments.

==== Study and analyses from orbit ====
During the “Exploration Telerobotics Symposium" in 2012, experts on telerobotics from industry, NASA, and academics met to discuss telerobotics and its applications to space exploration. Amongst other issues, particular attention was given to Mars missions and a Mars sample-return.

They came to the conclusion that telerobotic approaches could permit direct study of the samples on the Mars surface via telepresence from Mars orbit, permitting rapid exploration and use of human cognition to take advantage of chance discoveries and feedback from the results obtained.

They found that telepresence exploration of Mars has many advantages. The astronauts have near real-time control of the robots, and can respond immediately to discoveries. It also prevents contamination both ways and has mobility benefits as well.

Finally, return of the sample to orbit has the advantage that it permits analysis of the sample without delay, to detect volatiles that may be lost during a voyage home.

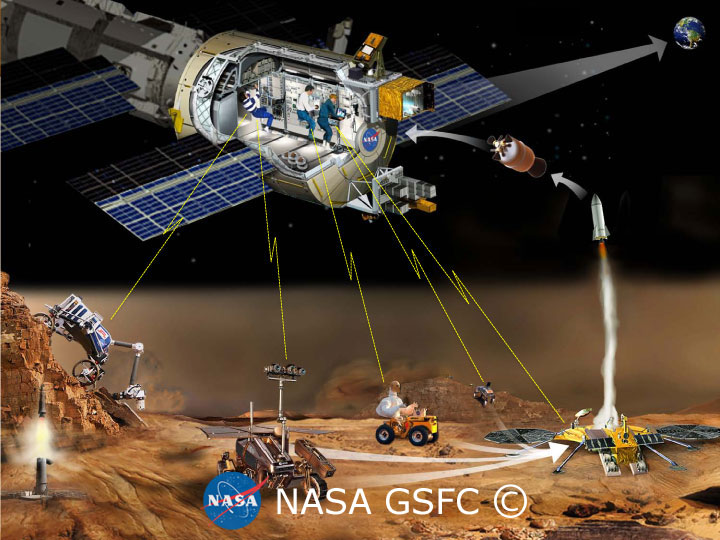
Telerobotics exploration of Mars

Similar methods could be used to directly explore other biologically sensitive moons such as Europa, Titan, or Enceladus, once human presence in the vicinity becomes possible.

== Forward contamination ==
=== The 2019 Beresheet incident ===
In August 2019, scientists reported that a capsule containing tardigrades (a resilient microbial animal) in a cryptobiotic state may have survived for a while on the Moon after the April 2019 crash landing of Beresheet, a failed Israeli lunar lander.

== See also ==
- Astrobiology – Science concerned with life in the universe
- Directed panspermia – Interplanetary introduction of species
- Ethics of terraforming – Philosophical debate
- Extremophiles – Organisms capable of living in extreme environments
- Glossary of invasion biology terms
- List of microorganisms tested in outer space
- Panspermia – Hypothesis on the interstellar spreading of primordial life
- Planetary protection – Prevention of interplanetary biological contamination
- Space debris – Pollution around Earth by defunct artificial objects
- Terraforming § Other possibilities
