= Island in the Sky =

Island in the Sky or Islands in the Sky may refer to:

- Floating island (fiction), a fictional landmass that floats in the sky

== Film and television ==
- Island in the Sky (1953 film), starring John Wayne
- Island in the Sky (1938 film)
- "Island in the Sky" (LIS episode), an episode of the TV series Lost in Space
- "Island in the Sky", part of an episode of the cartoon show Underdog (TV series)

== In print ==
- Island in the Sky, the Ernest K. Gann 1944 novel from which the 1953 film was adapted
- Island in the Sky (comics), a 1960 cartoon by Carl Barks
- "Island in the Sky", a 1941 short story and 1961 novel by Manly Wade Wellman
- An Island In The Sky: Selected Poetry of Al Pittman
- Islands in the Sky, a science fiction novel by Arthur C. Clarke
- Islands in the Sky (1996 book), a magazine compilation of essays on space colonization

== Places ==
- Island in the Sky, a district and a mesa in Canyonlands National Park, Utah

== See also ==
- Isle of Skye, Scotland, UK
- Sky island (disambiguation)
