= Energy Victory =

2007 book by Robert Zubrin

- Author: Robert Zubrin
- Language: English
- Genre: Non-fiction
- Publisher: Prometheus Books (U.S.)
- Publication date: November 10, 2007
- Publication place: United States
- Media type: Print (Hardcover)
- Pages: 336 pp
- ISBN: 1-59102-591-5
- OCLC: 153598118
- Dewey Decimal: 333.790973 22
- LC Class: TP358 .Z83 2007

Energy Victory: Winning the War on Terror by Breaking Free of Oil is a 2007 book by Robert Zubrin. Zubrin's central argument is that the decisive front in the war on terror is America's struggle for energy independence. He outlines the manner in which Islamic extremism has been financed by oil revenues, the technological feasibility of ethanol-fueled vehicles as well as the economic and agricultural imperatives for ethanol production, and the environmental implications of his plan.

== Synopsis ==
=== Problem ===
Zubrin contends that OPEC nations, particularly Saudi Arabia, have used their enormous oil wealth to fund Islamic extremism; in effect, the US is financing both sides of the war on terror. They have been able to do this through colluding to keep oil prices high. Due to its dependence on their oil, the United States (and the rest of the world) is powerless to do anything about this.

=== Flex-fuel mandate ===
The key to winning the war on terror, therefore, is to create a substitute for oil. Zubrin argues that a mandate that all new cars sold in the United States be flex-fueled (FFV, for Flex-Fuel Vehicle, able to run on gasoline, ethanol or methanol, or any combination thereof) would very quickly make such vehicles the world standard, as occurred in the early 1980s with the introduction of catalytic converters. As a result, consumers would demand ethanol- and methanol-blended fuels due to their price competitiveness with gasoline, which would in turn prompt gas stations to instal biofuel pumps. Under such a situation, competition would drive oil prices down. Zubrin argues that biofuels should be subsidized in order to keep their price advantage over gasoline, as it is the only way to cripple OPEC.

Some have argued that a switch to electric cars would be more beneficial. While this may be a longer-term solution, a switch to biofuel can be achieved in a few years (as in the case of Brazil). Additionally, existing cars (including hybrids) can be retrofitted with flex-fuel capability for "between $100 and $500".

A switch to biofuel would have the additional benefit that it is potentially a carbon-neutral fuel.

=== Development argument ===
Ethanol is produced primarily via the fermentation of corn or sugar cane (or indeed any other glucose-rich crop). Methanol can be produced from any plant matter. As both of these products can easily be produced in developing countries, Zubrin contends that the resultant expanding market for farm produce would be greatly beneficial for third-world farmers. There would be no need for western nations to subsidize their own farmers, as third-world produce could be absorbed into the larger market without causing a price-crash that would bankrupt western farmers.

=== Tariff elimination ===
Anne Korin, of The Institute for the Analysis of Global Security, has developed this concept further, adding to Zubrin's mandate the necessity to eliminate ethanol and sugar import tariffs in the United States for it to succeed.

== Reception ==
Gal Luft, writing for the Institute for the Analysis of Global Security, called Energy Victory "one of the best books written on our oil dependence problem".

Zubrin presented the arguments from Energy Victory at a series of "go green" lectures sponsored by the Advanced Planning and Partnership Office and hosted by NASA, in January 2008.

== See also ==
- Energy security
- Hydrogen economy
- List of books about energy issues
- Methanol economy
- New Manhattan Project for Energy Independence
- Open Fuel Standard Act of 2011
- Pickens Plan
- Wahhabism
