= Frank Crossman =

American engineer

Frank Crossman is an engineer and a member of the National Research Council, where he served on the National Materials Advisory Board. Crossman spent over thirty years working at Lockheed Martin. He is also active in the Mars Society, and is the co-editor with Robert Zubrin of two books of essays and articles related to exploring Mars.

He holds a Ph.D. in Materials Science and Engineering from Stanford University, and lives in Palo Alto, California.

== Books co-edited by Frank Crossman ==
- On to Mars: Colonizing a New World (2002), co-edited with Robert Zubrin, contains articles corresponding to talks presented at the annual conventions of the Mars Society in Boulder, Colorado in 1999, in Toronto, Ontario, Canada in 2000, and at Stanford University, Palo Alto, California in 2001. ISBN 978-1-896522-90-6
- On to Mars 2: Exploring and Settling a New World (2005), co-edited with Robert Zubrin, contains over 130 articles corresponding to talks presented at the annual conventions of the Mars Society in Boulder in 2002, in Eugene, Oregon in 2003, and in Chicago, Illinois in 2004. ISBN 978-1-894959-30-8
