= Extra-Terrestrial Exposure Law =

Regulations adopted by NASA to guard the Earth against any harmful contamination

The Extra-Terrestrial Exposure Law (14 CFR 1211 of the Code of Federal Regulations) — in force from 1969 to 1977 — was the popular name for regulations adopted by the National Aeronautics and Space Administration (NASA) in 1969 to formalize its "policy, responsibility and authority to guard the Earth against any harmful contamination … resulting from personnel, spacecraft and other property returning to the Earth after landing on or coming within the atmospheric envelope of a celestial body". Implemented before the Apollo 11 mission, it provided the legal authority for a quarantine period for the returning astronauts. The regulation defined "extraterrestrially exposed" as

...the state or condition of any person, property, animal or other form of life or matter whatever, who or which has (1) Touched directly or come within the atmospheric envelope of any other celestial body; or (2) Touched directly or been in close proximity (or been exposed indirectly to) any person, property, animal or other form of life or matter who or which has been extraterrestrially exposed by virtue of subparagraph (1) of this paragraph.

Quarantining of astronauts on the first lunar missions was mandated in 1969 to prepare for "the remote possibility that they are harboring unknown lunar organisms that might endanger life on earth", and the Apollo 11 voyagers were kept in quarantine for 21 days after their liftoff from the Moon.

NASA filed notices establishing quarantine periods in the Federal Register for Apollo 11, Apollo 12, Apollo 13 and Apollo 14. After the completion of the Apollo 14 mission, NASA stopped enforcing the regulation, though it remained on the books. On April 30, 1971, NASA's acting administrator, Dr. George M. Low, said,

On the basis of this analysis [of quarantine information from Apollo 14], as well as the results from the Apollo 11 and 12 flights, we have concluded there is no hazard to man, animals or plants in the lunar material...the interagency committee has recommended that further lunar missions need not be subject to quarantine.

NASA revoked the rule in 1977 and it was formally removed from the Code of Federal Regulations in 1991.

== See also ==
- Planetary protection – Prevention of interplanetary biological contamination
