= Sky island (disambiguation) =

A sky island is a mountain range isolated by valleys in which other ecosystems are located.

Sky island may also refer to:

- Sky Islands (Ramsey Lewis album), 1993
- Sky Islands (Caldera album), 1977
- Sky Island, a 1912 children's fantasy novel by L. Frank Baum
- Sky Island, also called The Sky Adventure (1936-1937), a serial in the Mickey Mouse comic strip by Floyd Gottfredson
- Sky Island Scenic Byway, Pima County, Arizona, USA; a highway

== See also ==
- Floating island (fiction), a fictional landmass that floats in the sky
- Isle of Skye, Scotland, UK
- Island in the Sky (disambiguation)
