= Terraforming =

Hypothetical planetary engineering process

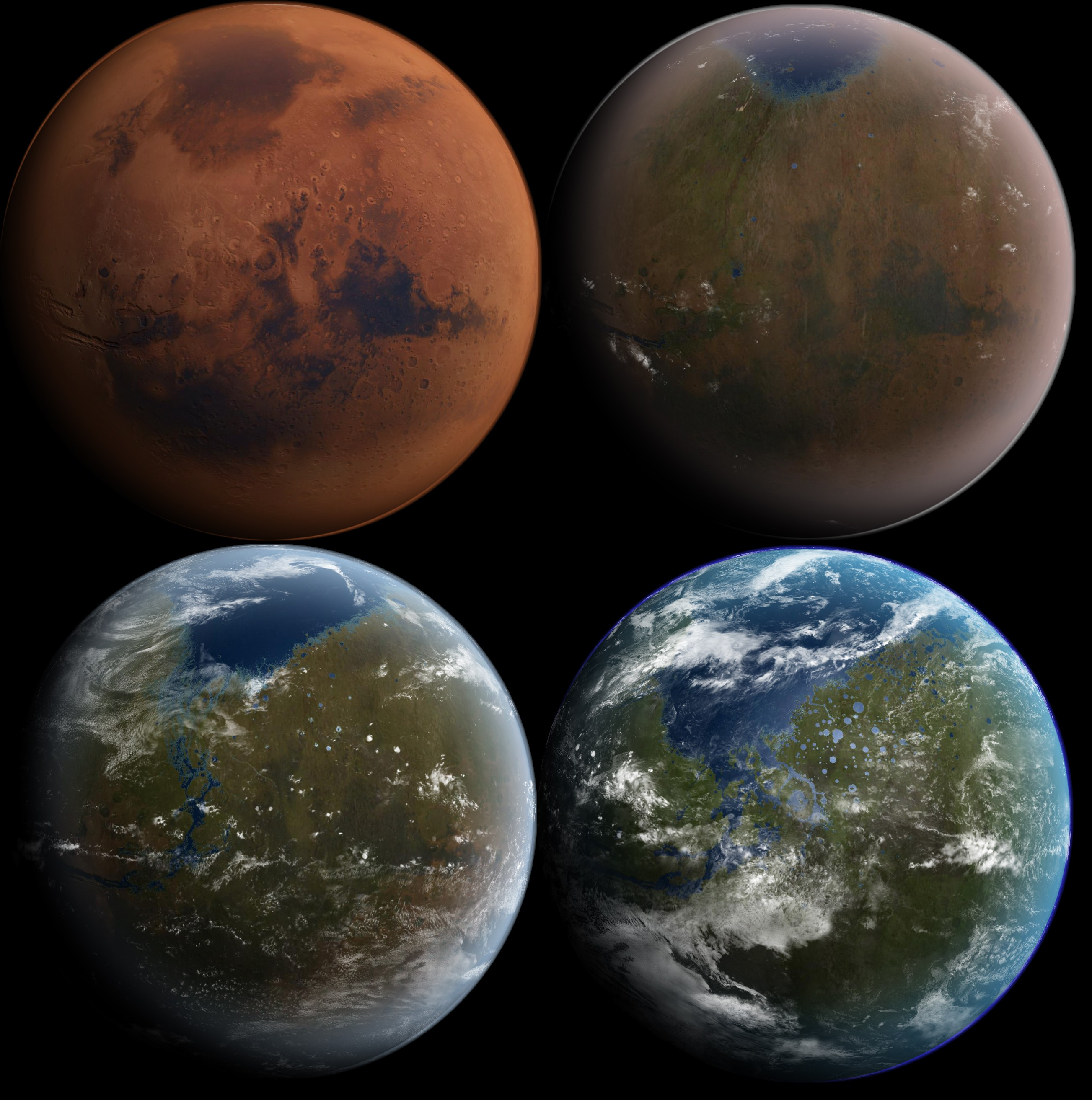
An artist's conception shows a terraformed Mars in four stages of development.

Terraforming or Earth-shaping is the hypothetical process of deliberately modifying the atmosphere, temperature, surface topography or ecology of a planet, moon, or other astronomical body to be similar to the environment of Earth, with the goal of making it habitable for humans.

The concept of terraforming developed from both science fiction and actual science. The term was coined by Jack Williamson in the science-fiction short story "Collision Orbit" in Astounding Science Fiction in 1942. American astronomer Carl Sagan later gave one of the first scientific propositions of terraforming with the planetary engineering of Venus in 1961.

Even if the environment of a planet could be altered deliberately, the feasibility of creating an unconstrained planetary environment that mimics Earth on another planet has yet to be verified. While Venus and the Moon have been studied in the subject of terraforming, Mars is usually considered to be the most likely candidate for terraforming. Much study has been done concerning the possibility of heating the planet and altering its atmosphere, and NASA has even hosted debates on the subject. Several potential methods for the terraforming of Mars may be within humanity's technological capabilities, but according to Martin Beech, the economic attitude of preferring short-term profits over long-term investments will not support a terraforming project.

The long timescales and practicality of terraforming are also the subject of debate. As the subject has gained traction, research has expanded to other possibilities including biological terraforming, para-terraforming, and modifying humans to better suit the environments of planets and moons. Despite this, questions still remain in areas relating to the ethics, logistics, economics, politics, and methodology of altering the environment of an extraterrestrial world, presenting issues to the implementation of the concept.

== Concept ==
The term "terraforming" was coined by Jack Williamson in “Collision Orbit” in 1942, as a term for making the environment around people habitable. It later came to mean making planets Earth-like in the sense of "Earth-forming". The concept gained traction when it became evident, with the first space probes going to other planets, that other planets were not habitable. Terraforming has since been envisioned as a means for humans to "colonize" space, or to make space relatable to Earth.

During the 1980s, American geographer Richard Cathcart successfully lobbied for formal recognition of the verb "to terraform". The word was added to the fourth edition of the Shorter Oxford English Dictionary in 1993.

The concept is contrasted by pantropy, the adaptation of humans to an alien environment rather than an environment to humans. Pantropy has also been envisioned as a substitute when terraforming is not complete.

== History of scholarly study ==
The astronomer Carl Sagan proposed the planetary engineering of Venus in an article published in the journal Science in 1961. Sagan imagined seeding the atmosphere of Venus with algae, which would convert water, nitrogen and carbon dioxide into organic compounds. As this process removed carbon dioxide from the atmosphere, the greenhouse effect would be reduced until surface temperatures dropped to "comfortable" levels. The resulting plant matter, Sagan proposed, would be pyrolyzed by the high surface temperatures of Venus, and thus be sequestered in the form of "graphite or some involatile form of carbon" on the planet's surface. However, later discoveries about the conditions on Venus made this particular approach impossible. One problem is that the clouds of Venus are composed of a highly concentrated sulfuric acid solution. Even if atmospheric algae could thrive in the hostile environment of Venus's upper atmosphere, an even more insurmountable problem is that its atmosphere is simply far too thick: the high atmospheric pressure would result in a "atmosphere of nearly pure molecular oxygen" at high pressure. This volatile combination could not be sustained through time. Any carbon that had been reduced by photosynthesis would be quickly oxidized in this atmosphere through combustion, "short-circuiting" the terraforming process.

Sagan also visualized making Mars habitable for human life in an article published in the journal Icarus, "Planetary Engineering on Mars" (1973). Three years later, NASA addressed the issue of planetary engineering officially in a study, but used the term "planetary ecosynthesis" instead. The study concluded that it was possible for Mars to support life and be made into a habitable planet. The first conference session on terraforming, then referred to as "Planetary Modeling", was organized that same year.

In March 1979, NASA engineer and author James Oberg organized the First Terraforming Colloquium, a special session at the Lunar and Planetary Science Conference in Houston. Oberg popularized the terraforming concepts discussed at the colloquium to the general public in his book New Earths (1981). Not until 1982 was the word terraforming used in the title of a published journal article. Planetologist Christopher McKay wrote "Terraforming Mars", a paper for the Journal of the British Interplanetary Society. The paper discussed the prospects of a self-regulating Martian biosphere, and the word "terraforming" has since become the preferred term.

In 1984, James Lovelock and Michael Allaby published The Greening of Mars. Lovelock's book was one of the first to describe a novel method of warming Mars, where chlorofluorocarbons (CFCs) are added to the atmosphere to produce a strong greenhouse effect.

Motivated by Lovelock's book, biophysicist Robert Haynes worked behind the scenes to promote terraforming, and contributed the neologism Ecopoiesis, forming the word from the Greek οἶκος, oikos, "house", and ποίησις, poiesis, "production". Ecopoiesis refers to the origin of an ecosystem. In the context of space exploration, Haynes describes ecopoiesis as the "fabrication of a sustainable ecosystem on a currently lifeless, sterile planet". Fogg defines ecopoiesis as a type of planetary engineering and is one of the first stages of terraformation. This primary stage of ecosystem creation is usually restricted to the initial seeding of microbial life. A 2019 opinion piece by Lopez, Peixoto and Rosado has reintroduced microbiology as a necessary component of any possible colonization strategy based on the principles of microbial symbiosis and their beneficial ecosystem services. As conditions approach those of Earth, plant life could be brought in, and this will accelerate the production of oxygen, theoretically making the planet eventually able to support animal life.

Ecopoiesis potentially allows a form of co-evolution of terraforming with the target environment.

=== Aspects and definitions ===
In 1985, Martyn Fogg started publishing several articles on terraforming. He also served as editor for a full issue on terraforming for the Journal of the British Interplanetary Society in 1992. In his book Terraforming: Engineering Planetary Environments (1995), Fogg proposed the following definitions for different aspects related to terraforming:

- Planetary engineering: the application of technology for the purpose of influencing the global properties of a planet.
- Geoengineering: planetary engineering applied specifically to Earth. It includes only those macro engineering concepts that deal with the alteration of some global parameter, such as the greenhouse effect, atmospheric composition, insolation or impact flux.
- Terraforming: a process of planetary engineering, specifically directed at enhancing the capacity of an extraterrestrial planetary environment to support life as we know it. The ultimate achievement in terraforming would be to create an open planetary ecosystem emulating all the functions of the biosphere of Earth, one that would be fully habitable for human beings.

Fogg also devised definitions for candidate planets of varying degrees of human compatibility:

- Habitable planet (HP): A world with an environment sufficiently similar to Earth's as to allow comfortable and free human habitation.
- Biocompatible planet (BP): A planet possessing the necessary physical parameters for life to flourish on its surface. If initially lifeless, then such a world could host a biosphere of considerable complexity without the need for terraforming.
- Easily-terraformable planet (ETP): A planet that might be rendered biocompatible, or possibly habitable, and maintained so by modest planetary engineering techniques and with the limited resources of a starship or robot precursor mission.

Fogg suggests that Mars was a biologically compatible planet in its youth, but is not now in any of these three categories, because it can only be terraformed with greater difficulty.

== Habitability requirements ==
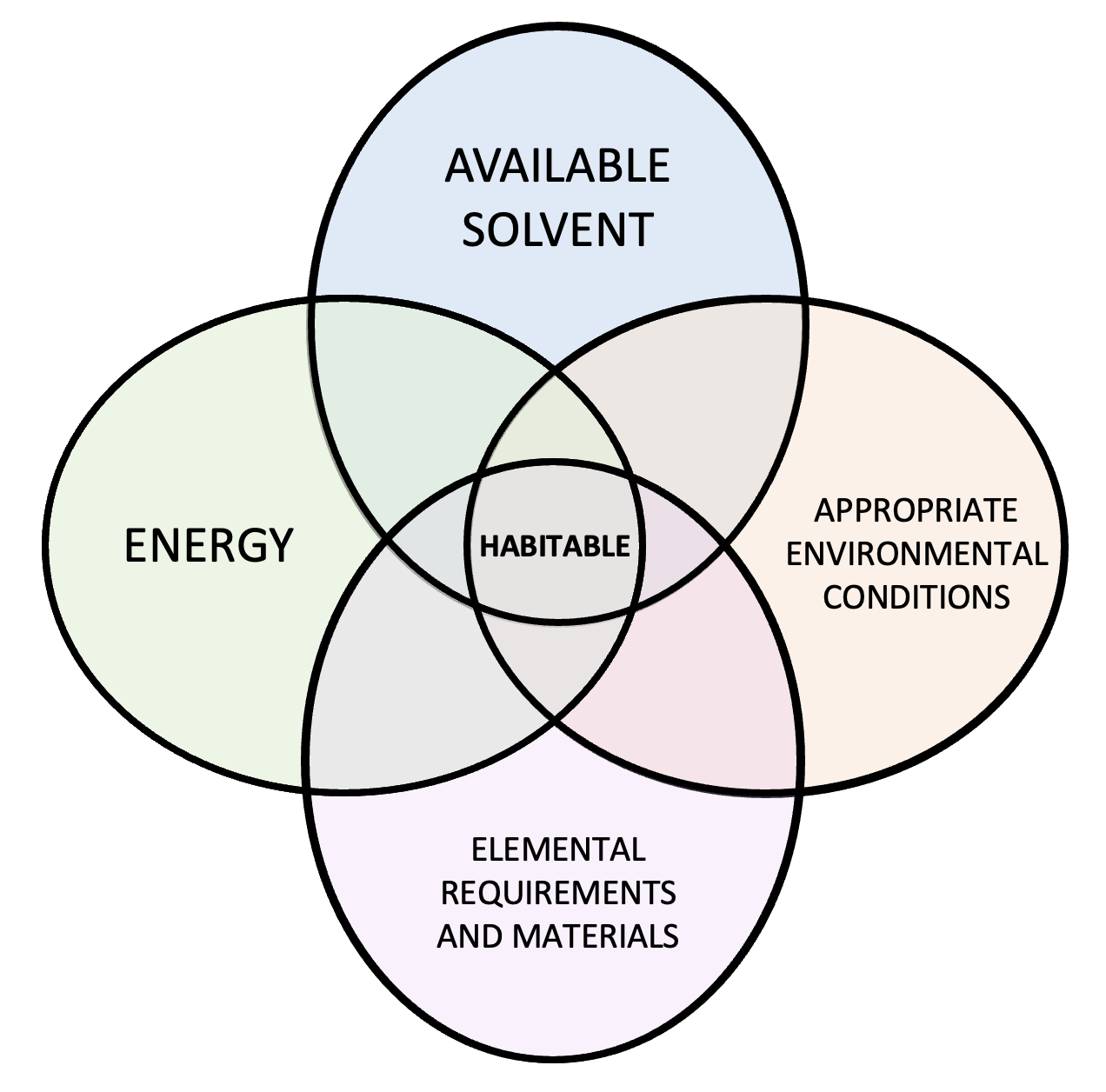
Necessary conditions for habitability, adapted from Hoehler (2007)

Planetary habitability, broadly defined as the capacity for an astronomical body to sustain life, requires that various geophysical, geochemical, and astrophysical criteria must be met before the surface of such a body is considered habitable. Modifying a planetary surface such that it is able to sustain life, particularly for humans, is generally the end-goal of the hypothetical process of terraforming. Of particular interest in the context of terraforming is the set of factors that have sustained complex, multicellular animals in addition to simpler organisms on Earth. Research and theory in this regard is a component of planetary science and the emerging discipline of astrobiology.

Classifications of the criteria of habitability can be varied, but it is generally agreed upon that the presence of water, non-extreme temperatures, and an energy source put broad constraints on habitability. Other requirements for habitability have been defined as the presence of raw materials, a solvent, and clement conditions, or elemental requirements (such as carbon, hydrogen, nitrogen, oxygen, phosphorus and sulfur), and reasonable physiochemical conditions. When applied to organisms present on Earth, including humans, these constraints can substantially narrow.

In its astrobiology roadmap, NASA has defined the principal habitability criteria as "extended regions of liquid water, conditions favorable for the assembly of complex organic molecules, and energy sources to sustain metabolism."

=== Temperature ===
The general temperature range for all life on Earth is -20°C to 122°C, set primarily by the ability of water (possibly saline, or under high pressure in the ocean bottom) to be available in liquid form. This may constitute a bounding range for the development of life on other planets, in the context of terraforming. For Earth, the temperature is set by the equilibrium of incident solar radiation absorbed and outgoing infrared radiation, including the effect of greenhouse gasses in modifying the planetary equilibrium temperature; terraforming concepts may include modifying temperature by methods including solar reflectors to increase or decrease the amount of solar illumination, and hence modify temperature.

=== Water ===
All known life requires water; thus the capacity for a planetary body to sustain water is a critical aspect of habitability. The habitable zone of a solar system is generally defined as the region in which stable surface liquid water may be present on a planetary body. The boundaries of the habitable zone were originally defined by water loss by photolysis and hydrogen escape, setting a limit on how close a planet may be to its orbited star, and the prevalence of CO_{2} clouds that would increase albedo, setting an outer boundary on stable liquid water. These constraints are applicable in particular to Earth-like planets, and would not as easily apply to moons like Europa and Enceladus with ice-covered oceans, where the energy source to keep the water liquid is from tidal heating, rather than solar energy.

=== Energy ===
On the most fundamental level, the only absolute requirement of life may be thermodynamic disequilibrium, or the presence of Gibbs free energy. It has been argued that habitability can be conceived of as a balance between life's demand for energy and the capacity for the environment to provide such energy. For humans, energy comes in the form of sugars, fats, and proteins provided by consuming plants and animals, necessitating in turn that a habitable planet for humans can sustain such organisms.

Much of Earth's biomass (~60%) relies on photosynthesis for an energy source, while a further ~40% is chemotropic. For the development of life on other planetary bodies, chemical energy may have been critical, while for sustaining life on another planetary body in the Solar System, sufficiently high solar energy may also be necessary for phototrophic organisms.

=== Elements ===
On Earth, life generally requires six elements in high abundance: carbon, hydrogen, nitrogen, oxygen, phosphorus, and sulfur. These elements are considered "essential" for all known life and plentiful within biological systems. Additional elements crucial to life include the cations Mg^{2}^{+}, Ca^{2}^{+}, K^{+} and Na^{+} and the anion Cl^{−}. Many of these elements may undergo biologically facilitated oxidation or reduction to produce usable metabolic energy.

== Preliminary stages ==
Terraforming a planet would involve making it fit the habitability requirements listed in the previous section. For example, a planet may be too cold for liquid water to exist on its surface. Its temperature could be raised by adding greenhouse gases to the atmosphere, using orbiting mirrors to reflect more sunlight onto the planet, or lowering the albedo of the planet. Conversely, a planet too hot for liquid water could be cooled down by removing greenhouse gases (if these are present), placing a sunshade in the L_{1} point to reduce sunlight reaching the planet, or increasing the albedo. Atmospheric pressure is another issue: various celestial bodies including Mars, Mercury and most moons have lower pressure than Earth. At pressures below the triple point of water (611.7 Pa), water cannot be liquid at any temperature. Human survival requires a still-higher pressure of at least 6.3 kPa, the Armstrong limit; below this pressure, exposed body fluids boil at body temperature. Furthermore, a thick atmosphere protects the surface from cosmic rays. A thin atmosphere could be thickened using gases produced locally or gases could be imported from elsewhere; for instance the Moon could be given an atmosphere of oxygen by reducing lunar rock.

Once conditions become more suitable for life of the introduced species, the importation of microbial life could begin. As conditions approach that of Earth, plant life could also be brought in. This would accelerate the production of oxygen, which theoretically would make the planet eventually able to support animal life.

== Prospective targets ==
=== Mars ===
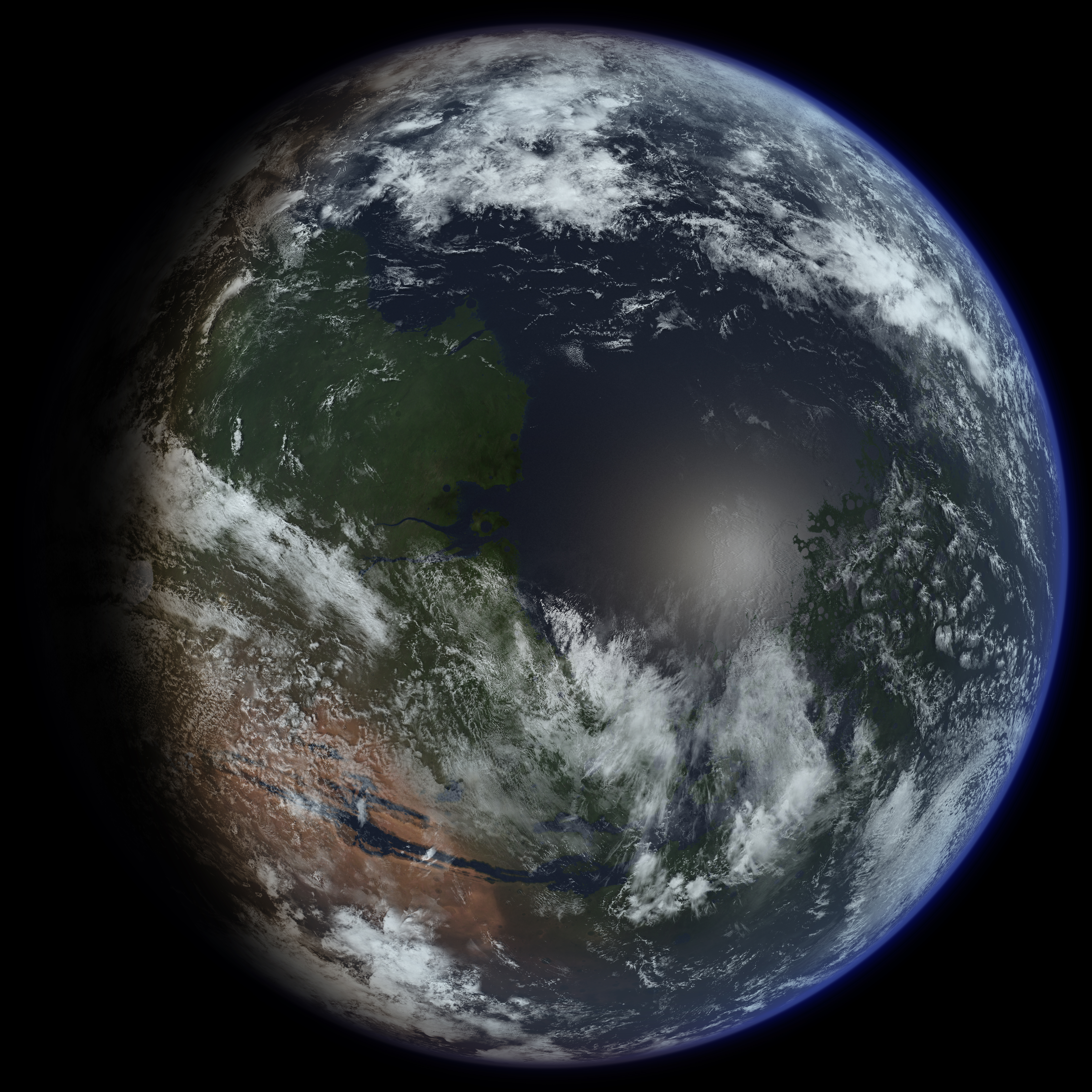
Artist's conception of a terraformed Mars

In many respects, Mars is the most Earth-like planet in the Solar System. It is thought that Mars once had a more Earth-like environment early in its history, with a thicker atmosphere and abundant water that was lost over the course of hundreds of millions of years.

The exact mechanism of this loss is still unclear, though three mechanisms, in particular, seem likely: First, whenever surface water is present, carbon dioxide (CO_{2}) reacts with rocks to form carbonates, thus drawing atmosphere off and binding it to the planetary surface. On Earth, this process is counteracted when plate tectonics works to cause volcanic eruptions that vent carbon dioxide back to the atmosphere. On Mars, the lack of such tectonic activity worked to prevent the recycling of gases locked up in sediments.

Second, the lack of a magnetosphere around Mars may have allowed the solar wind to gradually erode the atmosphere. Convection within the core of Mars, which is made mostly of iron, originally generated a magnetic field. However the dynamo ceased to function long ago, and the magnetic field of Mars has largely disappeared, probably due to "loss of core heat, solidification of most of the core, and/or changes in the mantle convection regime." Results from the NASA MAVEN mission show that the atmosphere is removed primarily due to coronal mass ejection events, where outbursts of high-velocity protons from the Sun impact the atmosphere. Mars does still retain a limited magnetosphere that covers approximately 40% of its surface. Rather than uniformly covering and protecting the atmosphere from solar wind, however, the magnetic field takes the form of a collection of smaller, umbrella-shaped fields, mainly clustered together around the planet's southern hemisphere.

Finally, between approximately 4.1 and 3.8 billion years ago, asteroid impacts during the Late Heavy Bombardment caused significant changes to the surface environment of objects in the Solar System. The low gravity of Mars suggests that these impacts could have ejected much of the Martian atmosphere into deep space.

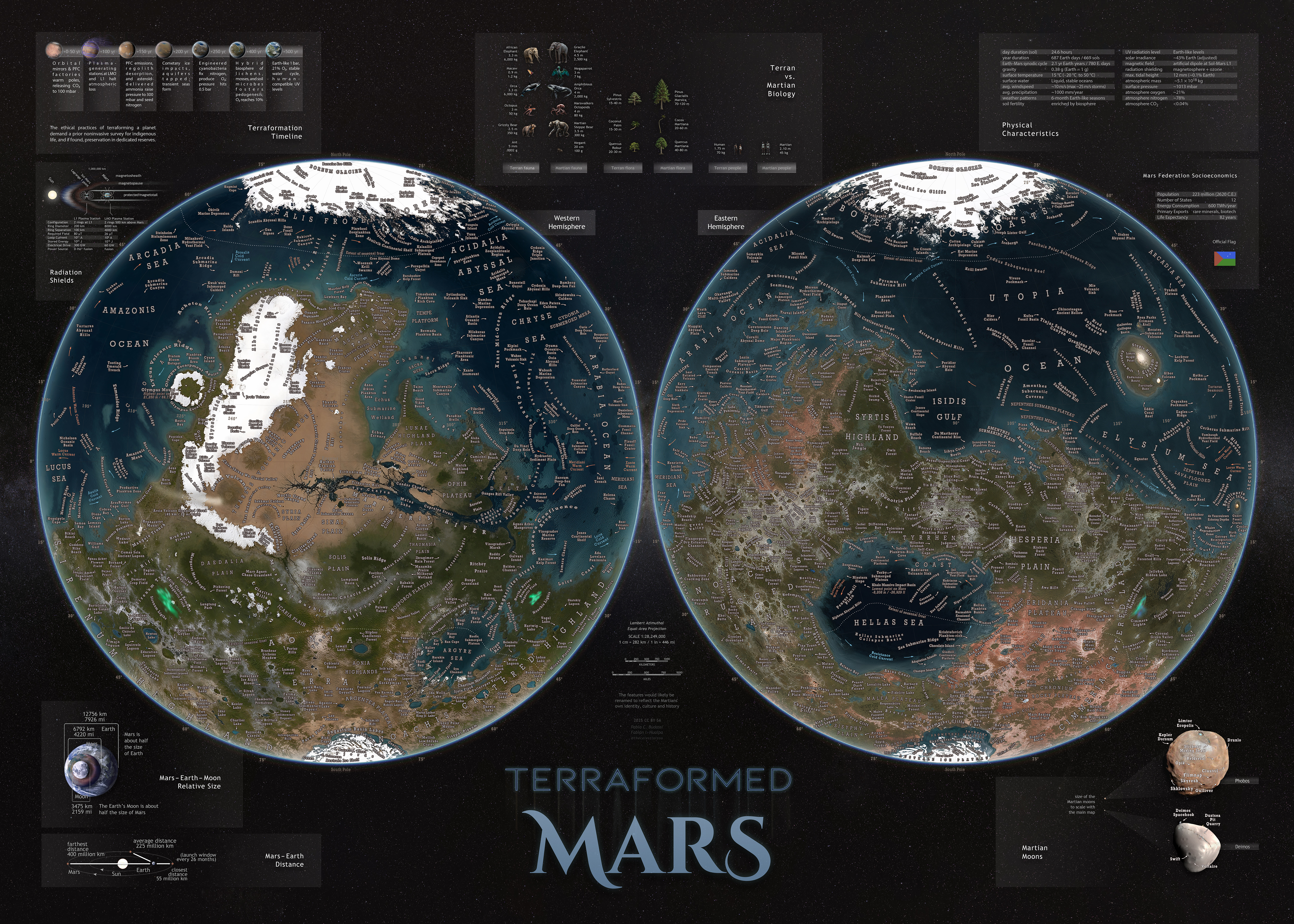
Fictional map of a fully terraformed Mars.

Terraforming Mars would entail two major interlaced changes: building the atmosphere and heating it. A thicker atmosphere of greenhouse gases such as carbon dioxide would trap incoming solar radiation. Because the raised temperature would add greenhouse gases to the atmosphere, the two processes would augment each other. Carbon dioxide alone would not suffice to sustain a temperature above the freezing point of water, so a mixture of specialized greenhouse molecules might be manufactured.

A realistic path to radical terraforming of Mars was presented by Andy Tomaswick. This would result in the creation of an atmosphere with a pressure of approximately 1000 hPa. The atmosphere would be obtained from bodies with a total mass of approximately 10^{19} kg (high in water and carbon dioxide) transported from the Kuiper Belt to Mars using thermonuclear rocket engines and gravity assist.

=== Venus ===
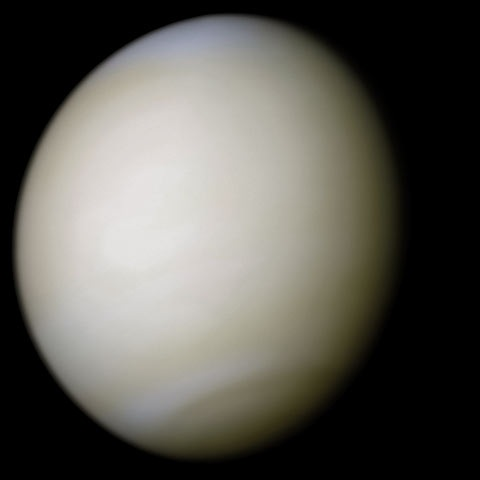
True-color image of Venus. To terraform, this dense atmosphere will need to be removed.

Terraforming Venus requires two major changes: removing most of the planet's dense 9 MPa (1,300 psi; 89 atm) carbon dioxide atmosphere, and reducing the planet's 450 °C (842 °F) surface temperature. These goals are closely interrelated because Venus's extreme temperature may result from the greenhouse effect caused by its dense atmosphere.

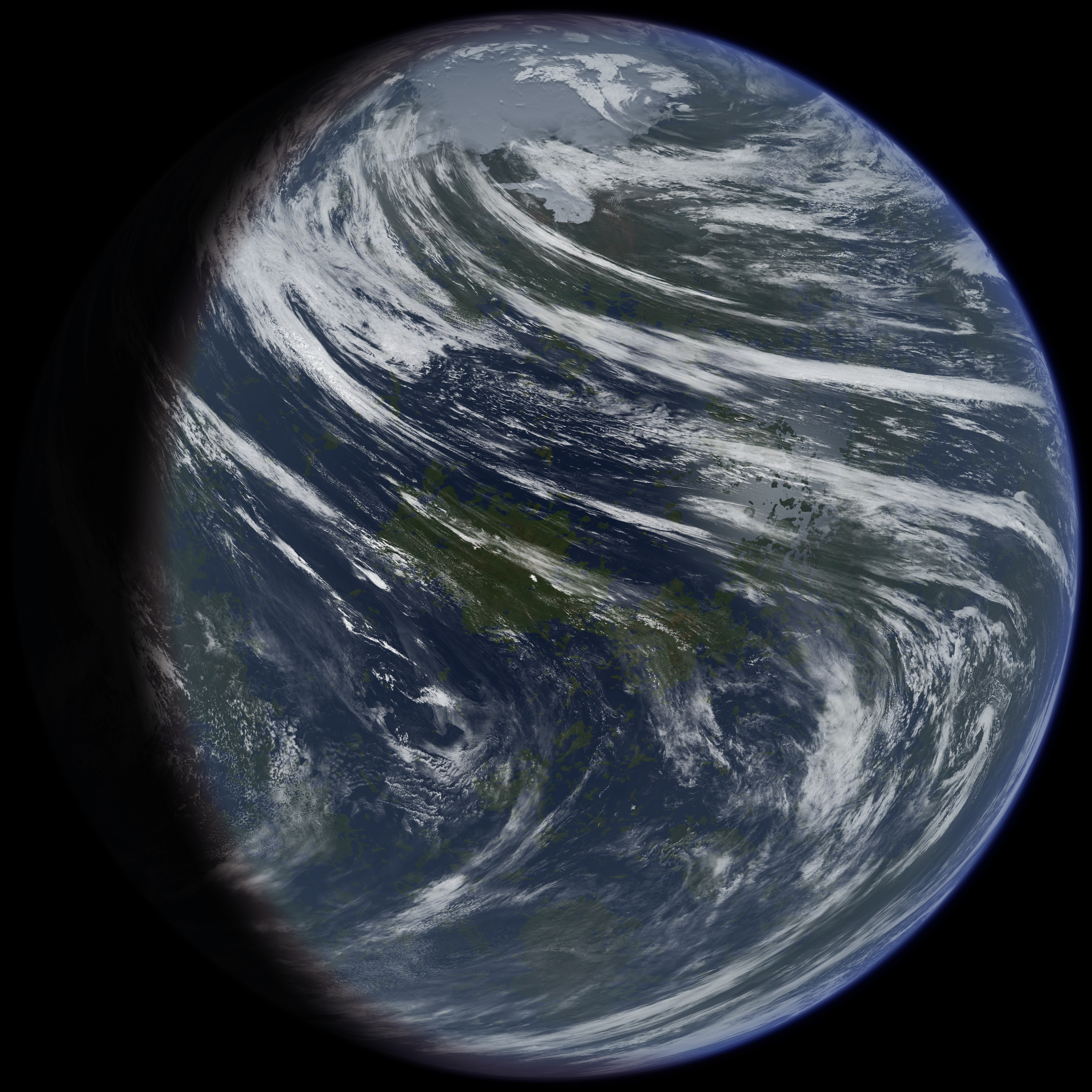
Artist's conception of a terraformed Venus

Venus's atmosphere currently contains little oxygen, so an additional step would be to inject breathable O_{2} into the atmosphere. An early proposal for such a process comes from Carl Sagan, who suggested the injection of floating, photosynthetic bacteria into the Venusian atmosphere to reduce CO_{2} to organic form, and increase the atmospheric concentration of O_{2} in the atmosphere. This concept, however, was based in a flawed 1960s understanding of Venus's atmosphere as much lower pressure; in reality, the Venusian atmospheric pressure (9300 kPa) is far higher than early estimates. Sagan's idea is therefore untenable, as he later conceded.

An additional step noted by Martin Beech includes the injection of water and/or hydrogen into the planetary atmosphere; this step follows after sequestering CO_{2} and reducing the mass of the atmosphere. In order to combine hydrogen with O_{2} produced by other means, an estimated 4×10^{19} kg of hydrogen is necessary; this may need to be mined from another source, such as Uranus or Neptune.

=== Moon ===
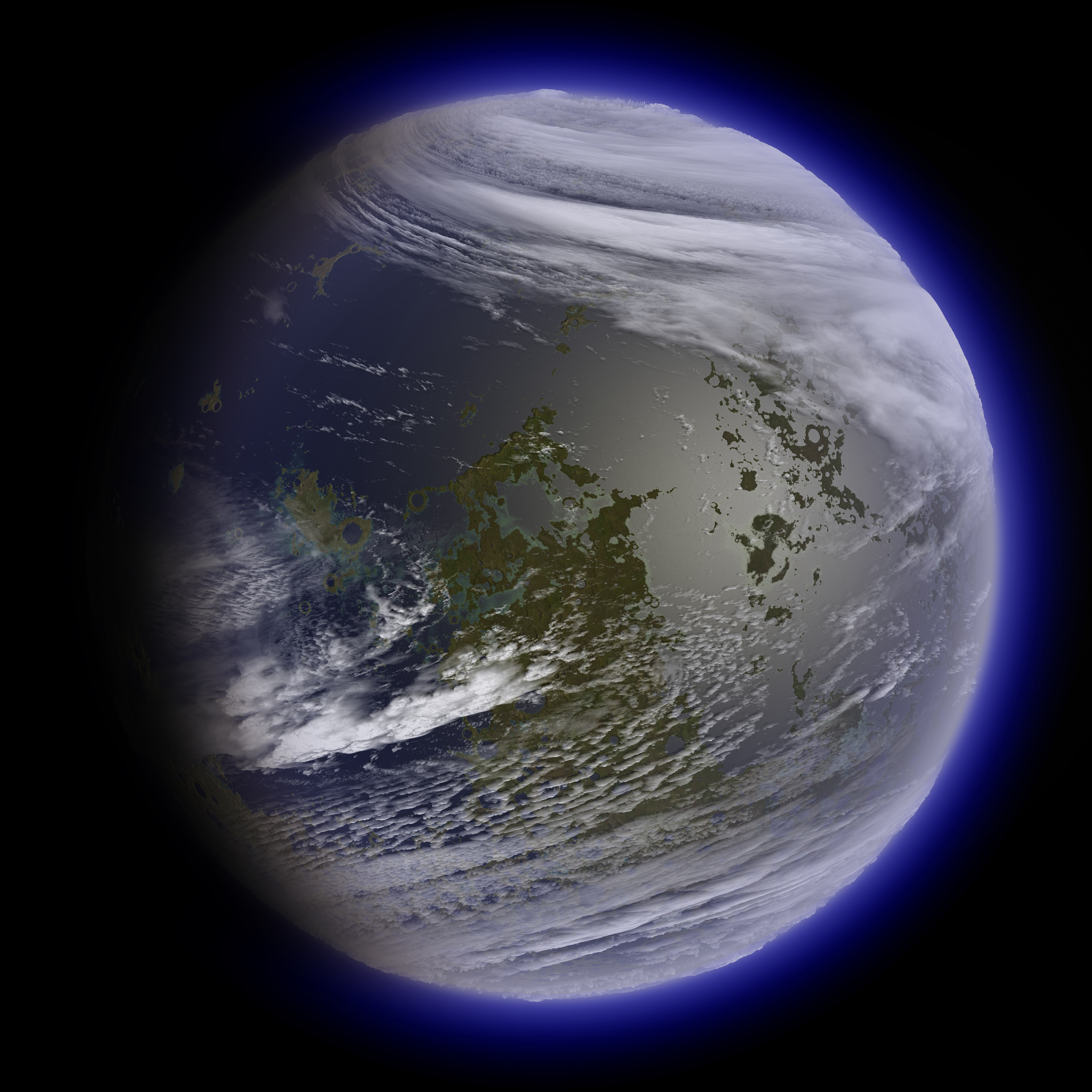
Artist's conception of the Moon terraformed as seen from Earth

Although the gravity on Earth's Moon is too low to hold an atmosphere for geological spans of time, if given one, it may retain it for relatively long periods of time. Landis and others have thus proposed that it could be feasible to terraform the Moon, although not all agree with that proposal. Landis estimates that a 6.89 kPa atmosphere of pure oxygen on the Moon would require on the order of two hundred trillion tons of oxygen, and suggests it could be produced by reducing the oxygen from an amount of lunar rock equivalent to a cube about fifty kilometers on an edge. Alternatively, he suggests that the water content of "fifty to a hundred comets" the size of Halley's Comet – about 789.639 trillion cubic liters of water – would do the job given it were placed onto the Moon.

=== Mercury ===
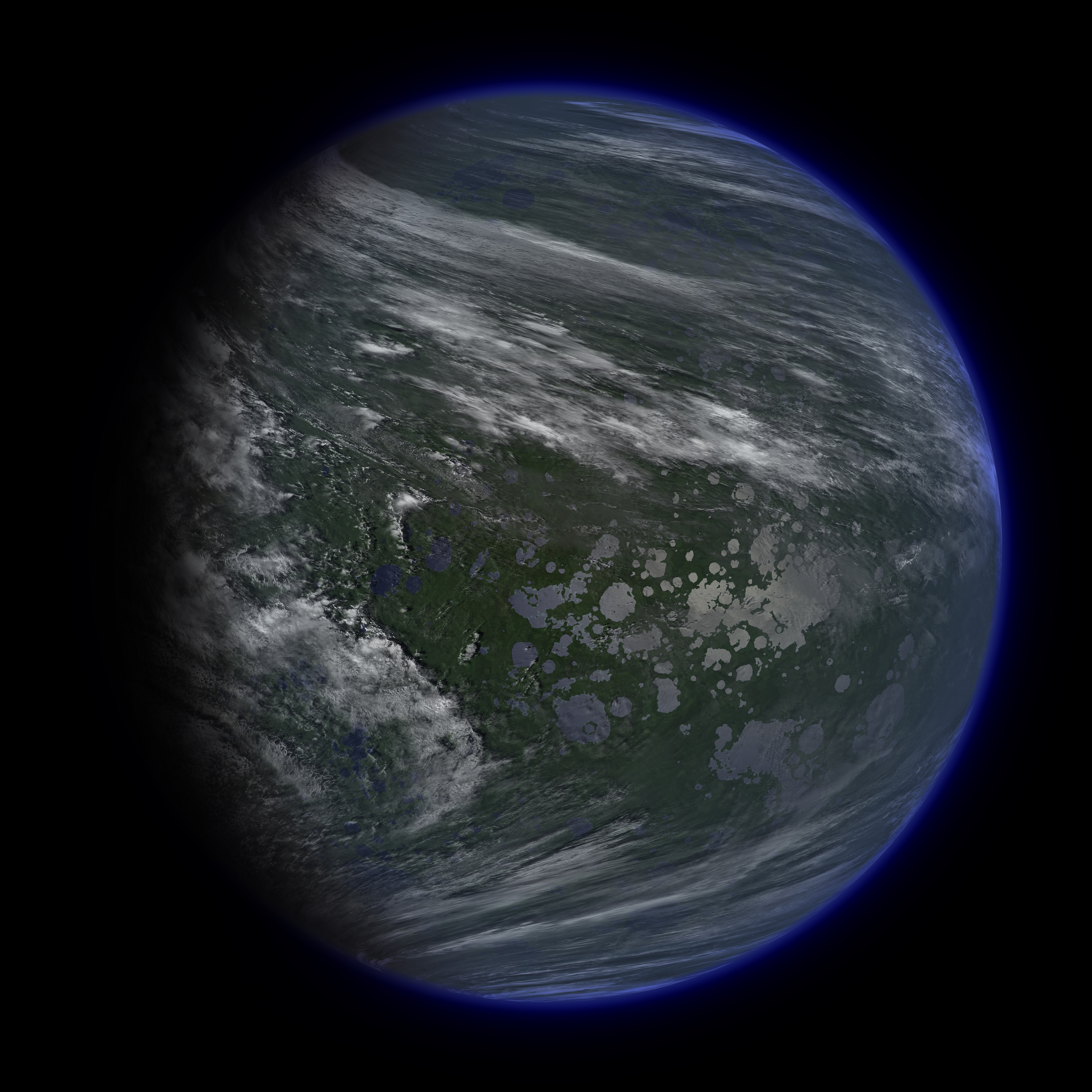
An artist's conception of the terraformed Mercury

Mercury would be difficult to terraform. Beech states "There seems little prospect of terraforming Mercury such that any animals or plants might exist there," and suggests that its primary use in a terraforming project would be as a mining source for minerals. Nevertheless, terraforming has been considered. Mercury's magnetic field is only 1.1% that of Earth's, and, being closer to the Sun, any atmosphere would be stripped rapidly unless it can be protected from the solar wind. It is conjectured that Mercury's magnetic field should be much stronger, up to 30% of Earth's, if it weren't being suppressed by certain solar wind feedback effects. If some means of shielding Mercury from solar wind by placing an artificial magnetic shield at Mercury-Sun L_{1} (similar to the proposal for Mars), then Mercury's magnetic field could possibly grow in intensity to a point where Mercury's magnetic field could be self-sustaining provided the field wasn't made to "stall" by another solar event.

Despite being much smaller than Mars, Mercury has an escape velocity only slightly less than that of Mars due to its higher density and could, if a magnetosphere prevents atmospheric stripping, hold a nitrogen/oxygen atmosphere for millions of years.

To provide one atmosphere of pressure, roughly 1.1×10^{18} kilograms of gas would be required; or a somewhat lower amount if lower pressure is acceptable. Water could be delivered from the outer Solar System. Once this water has been delivered, it would split the water into its constituent oxygen and hydrogen molecules, possibly using a photo-catalytic dust, with the hydrogen rapidly being lost to space. At an oxygen pressure of 20-30 kPa, the atmosphere would be breathable and nitrogen may be added as required to allow for plant growth in the presence of nitrates.

Temperature management would be required, due to the equilibrium average temperature of ~159 °C. However, millions of square kilometers at the poles have an average temperature of 0-50 °C (i.e., an area the size of Mexico at each pole with habitable temperatures). The total habitable area could be even larger if the planetary albedo were increased from 0.12 to ~0.6, potentially increasing the habitable area. Roy proposes that the temperature could be further managed by decreasing the solar flux at Mercury to near the terrestrial value by solar sails reflecting sunlight. He calculates that 16 to 17 million sails, each with an area of one square kilometer would be needed.

=== Earth ===
It has been recently proposed that due to the effects of climate change, an interventionist program might be designed to return Earth to pre-industrial climate parameters. In order to achieve this, multiple approaches have been proposed, such as the management of solar radiation, the sequestration of carbon dioxide, and the design and release of climate altering genetically engineered organisms. These are typically referred to as geoengineering or climate engineering, rather than terraforming.

=== Other bodies in the Solar System ===
Other possible candidates for terraforming (possibly only partial or paraterraforming) include large moons of Jupiter or Saturn (Europa, Ganymede, Callisto, Enceladus, Titan), and the dwarf planet Ceres.

The moons are covered in ice, so heating them would make some of this ice sublimate into an atmosphere of water vapour, ammonia and other gases. For Jupiter's moons, the intense radiation around Jupiter would cause radiolysis of water vapour, splitting it into hydrogen and oxygen. The former would be rapidly lost to space, leaving behind the oxygen (this already occurs on the moons to a minor extent, giving them thin atmospheres of oxygen). For Saturn's moons, the water vapour could be split by using orbital mirrors to focus sunlight, causing photolysis. The ammonia could be converted to nitrogen by introducing bacteria such as Nitrosomonas, Pseudomonas and Clostridium, resulting in an Earth-like nitrogen-oxygen atmosphere. This atmosphere would protect the surface from Jupiter's radiation, but it would also be possible to clear said radiation using orbiting tethers or radio waves.

Challenges to terraforming the moons include their high amounts of ice and their low gravity. If all of the ice were fully melted, it would result in deep moon-spanning oceans, meaning any settlements would have to be floating (unless some of the ice was allowed to remain, to serve as land). Low gravity would cause atmospheric escape over time and may cause problems for human health. However, atmospheric escape would take place over spans of time that are long compared to human lifespans, as with the Moon.

One proposal for terraforming Ceres would involve heating it (using orbital mirrors, detonating thermonuclear devices or colliding small asteroids with Ceres), creating an atmosphere and deep ocean. However, this appears to be based on a misconception that Ceres' surface is icy in a similar way to the gas giant moons. In reality, Ceres' surface is "a layer of mixed ice, silicates and light strong phases best matched by hydrated salts and clathrates". It is unclear what the result of heating this up would be.

== Other possibilities ==
=== Biological terraforming ===
Many proposals for planetary engineering involve the use of genetically engineered bacteria.

As synthetic biology matures over the coming decades it may become possible to build designer organisms from scratch that directly manufacture desired products efficiently. Lisa Nip, Ph.D. candidate at the MIT Media Lab's Molecular Machines group, said that by synthetic biology, scientists could genetically engineer humans, plants and bacteria to create Earth-like conditions on another planet.

Gary King, microbiologist at Louisiana State University studying the most extreme organisms on Earth, notes that "synthetic biology has given us a remarkable toolkit that can be used to manufacture new kinds of organisms specially suited for the systems we want to plan for" and outlines the prospects for terraforming, saying "we'll want to investigate our chosen microbes, find the genes that code for the survival and terraforming properties that we want (like radiation and drought resistance), and then use that knowledge to genetically engineer specifically Martian-designed microbes". He sees the project's biggest bottleneck in the ability to genetically tweak and tailor the right microbes, estimating that this could take "a decade or more" to be solved. He also notes that it would be best to develop "not a single kind of microbe but a suite of several that work together".

DARPA is researching the use of photosynthesizing plants, bacteria, and algae grown directly on the Mars surface that could warm up and thicken its atmosphere. In 2015 the agency and some of its research partners created a software called DTA GView, in which genomes of several organisms can be pulled up on the program to immediately show a list of known genes and where they are located in the genome. According to Alicia Jackson, deputy director of DARPA's Biological Technologies Office, they have developed a "technological toolkit to transform not just hostile places here on Earth, but to go into space not just to visit, but to stay".

=== Paraterraforming ===
Also known as the "world house" concept, para-terraforming involves the construction of a habitable enclosure on a planet that encompasses most of the planet's usable area. The enclosure would consist of a transparent roof held one or more kilometers above the surface, pressurized with a breathable atmosphere, and anchored with tension towers and cables at regular intervals. The world house concept is similar to the concept of a domed habitat, but one which covers all (or most) of the planet.

Potential targets for paraterraforming include Mercury, the Moon, Ceres and the gas giant moons.

=== Adapting humans ===
It has also been suggested that instead of or in addition to terraforming a hostile environment humans might adapt to these places by the use of genetic engineering, biotechnology and cybernetic enhancements. This is known as pantropy.

Examples of such adjustments include making organs fit for low gravity, increasing lung volumes for atmospheres with low oxygen levels and exoskeletons for high pressure ratios.

== Issues ==
=== Ethical issues ===
There is a philosophical debate within biology and ecology as to whether terraforming other worlds is an ethical endeavor. From the point of view of a cosmocentric ethic, this involves balancing the need for the preservation of human life against the intrinsic value of existing planetary ecologies. Lucianne Walkowicz has even called terraforming a "planetary-scale strip mining operation".

On the pro-terraforming side of the argument, there are those like Robert Zubrin, Martyn J. Fogg, Richard L. S. Taylor, and the late Carl Sagan who believe that it is humanity's moral obligation to make other worlds suitable for human life, as a continuation of the history of life-transforming the environments around it on Earth. They also point out that Earth would eventually be destroyed if nature takes its course, so that humanity faces a very long-term choice between terraforming other worlds or allowing all terrestrial life to become extinct. Terraforming totally barren planets, it is asserted, is not morally wrong as it does not affect any other life.

The opposing argument posits that terraforming would be an unethical interference in nature, and that given humanity's past treatment of Earth, other planets may be better off without human interference. Still others strike a middle ground, such as Christopher McKay, who argues that terraforming is ethically sound only once it is completely certain that an alien planet does not harbor life of its own; but that if it does, it should not try be reshaped to fit humans' own use, but rather to engineer its environment to artificially nurture the alien life and help it thrive and co-evolve, or even co-exist with humans. Even this would be seen as a type of terraforming to the strictest of ecocentrists, who would say that all life has the right, in its home biosphere, to evolve without outside interference.

=== Economic issues ===
The initial cost of such projects as planetary terraforming would be massive, and the infrastructure of such an enterprise would have to be built from scratch. Such technology has not yet been developed, let alone financially feasible at the moment. John Hickman has pointed out that almost none of the current schemes for terraforming incorporate economic strategies, and most of their models and expectations seem highly optimistic.

== In popular culture ==
Terraforming is a common concept in science fiction, ranging from television, movies and novels to video games.

A related concept from science fiction is xenoforming – a process in which aliens change the Earth or other planets to suit their own needs, already suggested in the classic The War of the Worlds (1898) of H.G. Wells, in its specific case of areoforming (from Ares, the Greek alternative name of Mars), Earth being its subject.

== See also ==
- Artificial planet – Proposed stellar megastructure
- Astrobotany – Study of plants grown in spacecraft
- Climate engineering, also known as Geoengineering – Deliberate and large-scale intervention in Earth's climate system
- Colonization of Mars
- Colonization of Venus – Engineering the global environment of Venus to make it suitable for humans
- Desert greening – Process of man-made reclamation of deserts
- Effect of spaceflight on the human body – Medical issues associated with spaceflight
- Extraterrestrial liquid water – Liquid water naturally occurring outside Earth
- Health threat from cosmic rays – Cancer causing exposure to ionizing radiation in spaceflight
- In situ resource utilization – Astronautical use of materials harvested in outer space
- Pantropy – Hypothetical process of space colonization
- Planetary engineering – Influencing a planet's global environments
- Planetary habitability – Known extent to which a planet is suitable for life
- Space colonization – Concept of permanent human habitation outside of Earth
- Terraforming of Mars – Hypothetical modification of Mars into an Earth-like habitable planet
- Terraforming of Venus – Engineering the global environment of Venus to make it suitable for humans

== Bibliography ==
- Averner, M. M.; MacElroy, R. D., eds. (1976). On the Habitability of Mars: An Approach to Planetary Ecosynthesis. NASA.
- Beech, Martin (21 April 2009). Terraforming: The Creating of Habitable Worlds. Springer Science & Business Media. ISBN 978-0-387-09796-1.
- Dalrymple, G. Brent (2004). Ancient Earth, ancient skies: the age of Earth and its cosmic surroundings. Stanford University Press. ISBN 0-8047-4933-7
- Faure, Gunter & Mensing, Teresa M. (2007). Introduction to planetary science: the geological perspective. Springer. ISBN 1-4020-5233-2.
- Fogg, Martyn J. (1995). Terraforming: Engineering Planetary Environments. SAE International, Warrendale, PA. ISBN 1-56091-609-5.
- Fogg, Martyn J. (1996). "A Planet Dweller's Dream". In Schmidt, Stanley; Zubrin, Robert (eds.). Islands in the Sky. New York: Wiley. pp. 143–67.
- Fogg, Martyn J. (1998). "Terraforming Mars: A Review of Current Research" (PDF). Advances in Space Research. 2 (3). Committee on Space Research: 415–420. Bibcode:1998AdSpR..22..415F. doi:10.1016/S0273-1177(98)00166-5.
- Fogg, Martyn J. (2000). The Ethical Dimensions of Space Settlement (PDF format). Space Policy, 16, 205–211. Also presented (1999) at the 50th International Astronautical Congress, Amsterdam (IAA-99-IAA.7.1.07).
- Forget, François; Costard, François & Lognonné, Philippe (2007). Planet Mars: Story of Another World. Springer. ISBN 0-387-48925-8.
- Kargel, Jeffrey Stuart (2004). Mars: a warmer, wetter planet. Springer. ISBN 1-85233-568-8.
- Knoll, Andrew H. (2008). "Cyanobacteria and earth history". In Herrero, Antonia; Flores, Enrique (eds.). The cyanobacteria: molecular biology, genomics, and evolution. Horizon Scientific Press. pp. 1–20. ISBN 978-1-904455-15-8.
- MacNiven, D. (1995). "Environmental Ethics and Planetary Engineering". Journal of the British Interplanetary Society. 48: 441–44.
- McKay Christopher P. & Haynes, Robert H. (1997). "Implanting Life on Mars as a Long Term Goal for Mars Exploration", in The Case for Mars IV: Considerations for Sending Humans, ed. Thomas R. Meyer (San Diego, California: American Astronautical Society/Univelt), Pp. 209–15.
- Read, Peter L.; Lewis, Stephen R. (2004). The Martian climate revisited: atmosphere and environment of a desert planet. Springer. ISBN 3-540-40743-X.
- Sagan, Carl & Druyan, Ann (1997). Pale Blue Dot: A Vision of the Human Future in Space. Ballantine Books. ISBN 0-345-37659-5.
- Schubert, Gerald; Turcotte, Donald L.; Olson, Peter. (2001). Mantle convection in the Earth and planets. Cambridge University Press. ISBN 0-521-79836-1.
- Taylor, Richard L. S. (1992). "Paraterraforming – The world house concept". Journal of the British Interplanetary Society, vol. 45, no. 8, pp. 341–352. ISSN 0007-084X. Bibcode:1992JBIS...45..341T.
- Thompson, J. M. T. (2001). Visions of the future: astronomy and Earth science. Cambridge University Press. ISBN 0-521-80537-6.
