= Name of Mars =

Overview of the planet's name

In English, the planet Mars is named after Mars, the Roman god of war, an association made because of its red color, which suggests blood. The adjectival form of Latin Mars is Martius, from which the English word Martian derives, used as an adjective or for a putative inhabitant of Mars, and Martial, used as an adjective corresponding to Terrestrial for Earth. In Greek, the planet is known as Ἄρης Arēs, with the inflectional stem Ἄρε- Are-. That is because of the Greek equivalent to Mars is Ares. From this come technical terms such as areology, as well as the (rare) adjective Arean and the star name Antares.

Mars is also the basis of the name of the month of March (from Latin Martius mēnsis 'month of Mars'), as well as of Tuesday (Latin dies Martis 'day of Mars'), where the old Anglo-Saxon god Tíw was identified as the Anglo-Saxon equivalent to Mars by Interpretatio germanica.

Due to the global influence of European languages in astronomy, a word like Mars or Marte for the planet is common around the world, though it may be used alongside older, native words. A number of other languages have provided words with international usage. For example:

- Arabic المِرِّيخ al-Mirrīkh – which connotes fire – is used as the (or a) name for the planet in Persian, Urdu, Malay and Swahili, among others.
- Chinese 火星 [Mandarin Huǒxīng] 'fire star' (in Chinese the five classical planets are identified with the five elements) is used in Korean, Japanese and Vietnamese.
- India uses the Sanskrit term Mangal derived from the Hindu god Mangala.
- A long-standing nickname for Mars is the "Red Planet". That is also the planet's name in Hebrew, מַאֲדִים Ma'adim, which is derived from אדום adom, meaning 'red clay'.
- The archaic Latin form Māvors (/ˈmeɪvɔːrz/) is seen, but only very rarely, in English, though the adjectives Mavortial and Mavortian mean 'martial' in the military rather than planetary sense.
