= DTA GView =

DTA GView is a program in which genomes of several organisms can be pulled up on the program to immediately show a list of known genes and where they are located in the genome. It has been referred to as a "google maps" of genomes.

== Purpose ==
The purpose of DTA GVeiw is to collect data of organisms, in the hope of one day engineering microbial organisms to help make mars a suitable place for life.

DARPA, the creator of DTA GVeiw, Hopes one day they will be enabled to "pick and choose" desired genes to create new organisms capable of living on a foreign planet.
