= Christopher McKay =

American planetary scientist

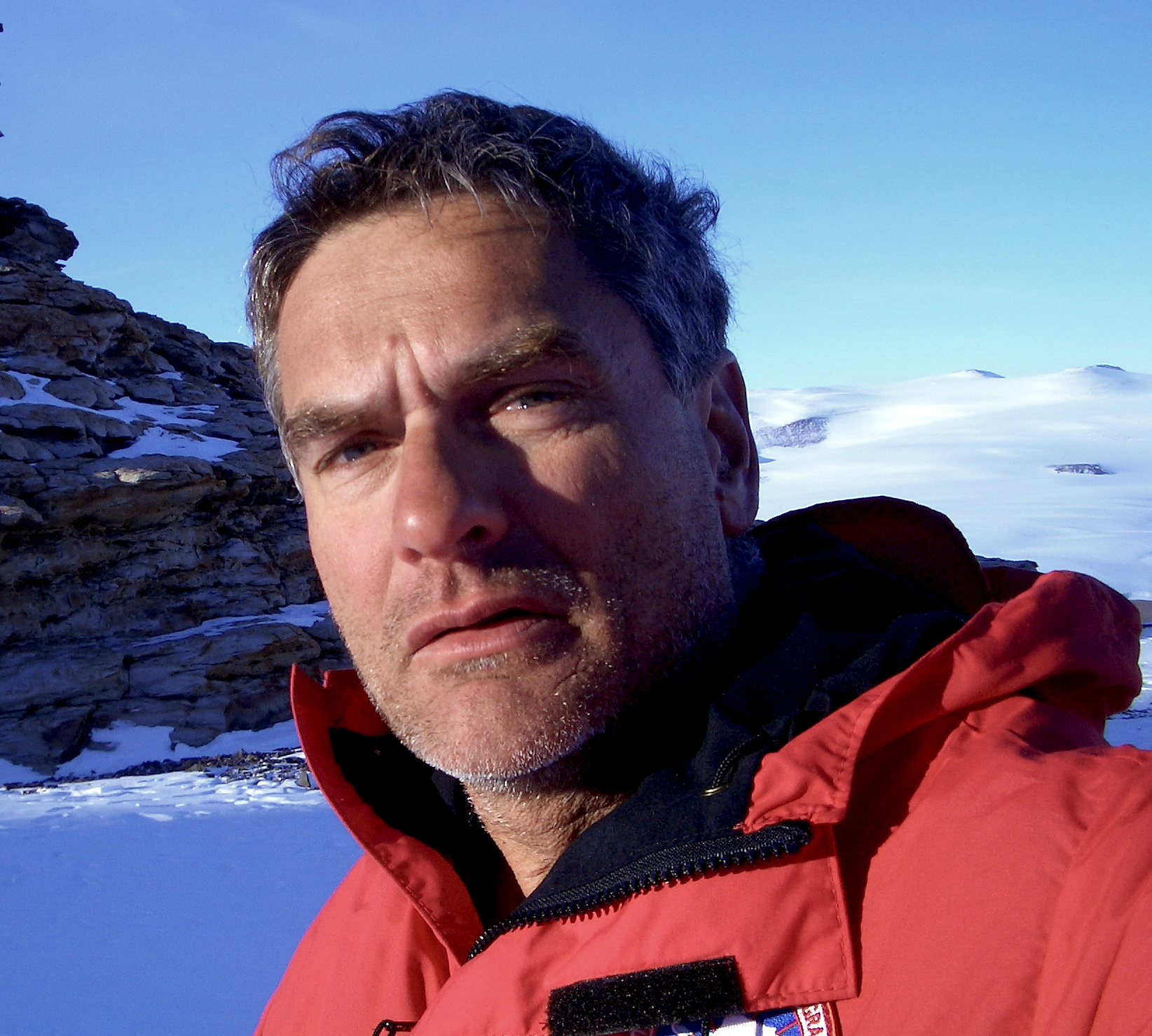
- McKay in Antarctica in 2005
- Education: Physics, Florida Atlantic University Mechanical Engineering, Florida Atlantic University PhD in astrogeophysics, University of Colorado (1982)
- Occupations: Planetary Scientist, NASA Ames Research Center
- Organization: Planetary Society Mars Society

Christopher P. McKay (born 1954) is an American planetary scientist at NASA Ames Research Center, studying planetary atmospheres, astrobiology, and terraforming. McKay majored in physics at Florida Atlantic University, where he also studied mechanical engineering, graduating in 1975. He also received his PhD in astrogeophysics from the University of Colorado in 1982.

== Career ==
McKay has done research on planetary atmospheres, particularly the atmospheres of Titan and Mars, and on the origin and evolution of life. He is a co-investigator on the Huygens probe, the Mars Phoenix lander, and the Mars Science Laboratory. He also performed field research on extremophiles, in such locations as Death Valley, the Atacama Desert, Axel Heiberg Island, and ice-covered lakes in Antarctica. McKay is the Principal Investigator of the proposed Icebreaker Life astrobiology mission to Mars. In 2015 he received the Nevada Medal.

He was a member of the board of directors of the Planetary Society and also works with the Mars Society, and has written and spoken on space exploration and terraforming. He is also an adviser for the Microbes Mind Forum.

== Ethics of terraforming ==
McKay advocates a moderately biocentric position in the ethics of terraforming, arguing that we must thoroughly explore a planet such as Mars first to discover whether there is any microbial life before taking first steps toward terraforming, and that if indigenous alien life is found in an obscure niche or dormant on Mars, we should remove all Earth life and alter Mars to support the global spread of this alien life on Mars. He has held a series of public debates with Robert Zubrin, who advocates a moderately anthropocentric position on the ethics of terraforming.

== See also ==
- David S. McKay (September 25, 1936 – February 20, 2013) a NASA astrobiologist
