= Martyn Fogg =

British physicist (born 1960)

- Born: Martyn John Fogg; 3 July 1960 (age 66); London, England, UK
- Education: Queen Mary University of London
- Occupations: Physicist, geologist

Martyn John Fogg (born 3 July 1960) is a British physicist and geologist, an expert on terraforming.

== Biography ==
After becoming a dental surgeon, Fogg graduated in physics and geology and a master in astrophysics. He obtained his M.S. in astrophysics at Queen Mary College of the University of London with a thesis on origin and distribution of free-floating planets in 2002, and a Ph.D in planetary science with work on the dynamics of planetary formation involving the modelling of the formation of terrestrial planets in the presence of giant planet migration in 2008. Fogg lives in London.

== Research ==
=== Contributions to global engineering ===
Fogg's scientific work started in 1985, with work on simulating extrasolar planetary systems. Starting in 1987, Fogg began research on terraforming, and published a series of articles on the subject, primarily in the Journal of the British Interplanetary Society. He served as guest editor for a special issue on the subject in 1991. In 1995 this work culminated in the book Terraforming: Engineering Planetary Environments, the first textbook on the subject of terraforming.

In addition to Journal of the British Interplanetary Society, he has published in various journals including: Icarus, Astronomy and Astrophysics, Comments on Astrophysics, Advances in Space Research. and Earth, Moon, and Planets, as well as presenting papers at various scientific and technical conferences.

=== Planetary migration ===
Since the 2000s, his research has focused on dynamics of planet formation, and the effects of the migration of planets such as hot Jupiters on early solar system formation.

== See also ==
- Terraformation

== Bibliography ==
=== Book ===
- M. J. Fogg, Terraforming: Engineering Planetary Environments, SAE Press, ISBN 1-56091-609-5, 1995.

==== Reviews ====
- Book review: Terraforming: Engineering Planetary Environments, Martyn J. Fogg, Geoffrey Landis, NASA Glenn Research Center
- Book Review: Terraforming: Engineering Planetary Environments, D. P. McKay, NASA Ames Research Center, Moffett Field, Californie, in Icarus, volume 130, n°2, p. 552.

=== Articles available online ===
- Free-Floating Planets: Their Origin and Distribution, Master Thesis
- Terraforming Mars: A Review of Research
- Oligarchic and giant impact growth of terrestrial planets in the presence of gas giant migration, in Astronomy and Astrophysics vol. 441, pp. 791–806, 2005
- Artesian Basins on Mars: Implications for Settlement, Life-Search and Terraforming, Mars Society
- The Ethical Dimensions of Space Settlement, International Astronautical Congress, International Academy of Astronautics, Amsterdam, 1999, in Space Policy, 16, 205-211, 2000
