= Robert Zubrin =

American aerospace engineer (born 1952)

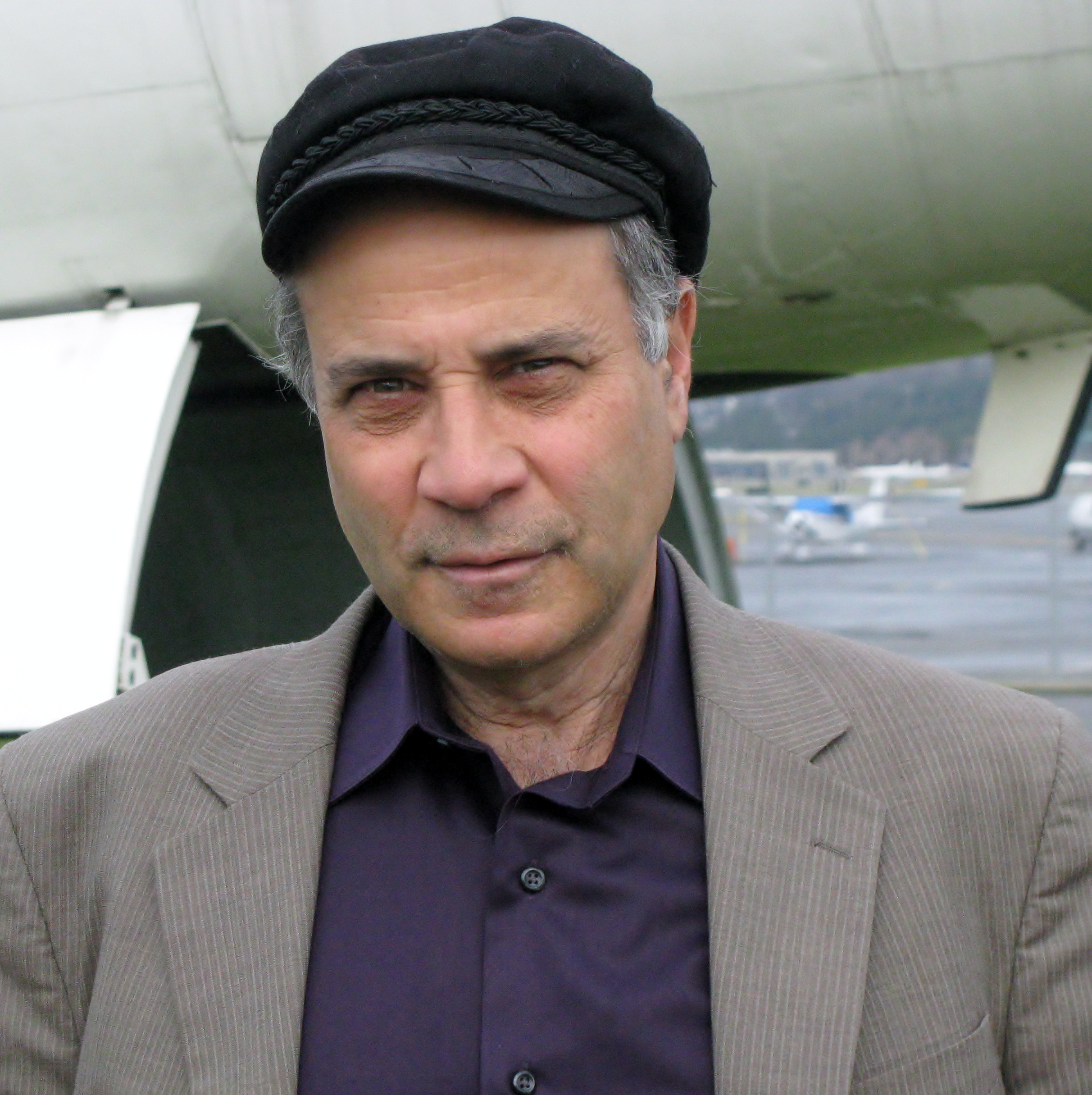
- Zubrin in 2011
- Born: April 9, 1952 (age 74); New York City, U.S.
- Education: University of Rochester (BA); University of Washington (MS, PhD)
- Known for: Mars Direct; Mars Society; The Case for Mars; Energy Victory
- Spouse: Hope Zubrin
- Scientific career
- Fields: Aerospace engineering
- Workplaces: Martin Marietta; Pioneer Astronautics

Robert Zubrin (/ˈzuːbrɪn/; born April 9, 1952) is an American aerospace engineer, author, and advocate for human exploration of Mars. He is also an advocate for U.S. space superiority, writing that "in the 21st century, victory on land, sea or in the air will go to the power that controls space" and that "if we desire peace on Earth, we need to prepare for war in space."

He and his colleague at Martin Marietta, David Baker, were the driving force behind Mars Direct, a proposal in a 1990 research paper intended to produce significant reductions in the cost and complexity of a mission to Mars. The key idea was to use the Martian atmosphere to produce oxygen, water, and rocket propellant for the surface stay and return journey. A modified version of the plan was subsequently adopted by NASA as a "design reference mission". He questioned the delay and cost-to-benefit ratio of first establishing a base or outpost on an asteroid or another Apollo program-like return to the Moon, as neither would be able to provide all of its own oxygen, water, or energy; these resources are producible on Mars, and he expected people would be there thereafter.

Zubrin established the Mars Society in 1998, an international organization advocating a human mission to Mars, by private funding if possible.

== Early life ==
Zubrin was born in Brooklyn, New York City on April 9, 1952. His father was descended from Russian Jewish immigrants.

== Career ==
Zubrin holds a B.A. in Mathematics from the University of Rochester (1974); he was a science teacher for 7 years before becoming an engineer. He earned a M.S. in Nuclear Engineering (1984), a M.S. in Aeronautics and Astronautics (1986), and a Ph.D. in Nuclear Engineering (1992)—all from the University of Washington. He has developed a number of concepts for space propulsion and exploration, and is the author of over 200 technical and non-technical papers and several books. He is also President of both the Mars Society and Pioneer Astronautics, a private aerospace company.

Zubrin's inventions include the nuclear salt-water rocket and co-inventor (with Dana Andrews) of the magnetic sail. Zubrin is a fellow at the Center for Security Policy.

During his professional career, Zubrin was a member of Lockheed Martin's scenario development team charged with developing strategies for space exploration. He was also "a senior engineer with the Martin Marietta Astronautics company, working as one of its leaders in development of advanced concepts for interplanetary missions". During his time at Martin Marietta, he drafted ideas for a potential single-stage-to-orbit spacecraft, and developed the Black Colt rocket. He would eventually leave Martin Marietta to co-form Pioneer Rocketplane with Mitchell Burnside Clapp, an aerospace engineer from the US Air Force, due to a perceived lack of interest in reducing launch costs at larger aerospace firms. In his book, Entering Space: Creating a Spacefaring Civilization, Zubrin wrote about how both large aerospace firms, and the US Government, would fail to reduce the costs of spaceflight.

In 1998, Zubrin founded the Mars Society, and in the following years, was able to attract public interest to potential human colonisation on Mars. The work of the Mars Society was successful enough as to encourage the US Government to not cut funding for several Mars rover missions.

=== Pioneer Astronautics ===
In 1996, Zubrin founded Pioneer Astronautics (formerly Pioneer Invention), a company developing technologies to further space exploration and improve life on earth. The company relied primarily on small business research contracts and tackled a large variety of space-relevant problems.

On 13 July 2020, Voyager Space Holdings announced its acquisition of Pioneer Astronautics.

=== Pioneer Energy ===
In 2008, Zubrin founded Pioneer Energy, a research and development firm headquartered in Lakewood, Colorado. The company's focus is to develop mobile Enhanced Oil Recovery (EOR) systems that can enable CO_{2}-based EOR for both small and large oil producers in the United States. The company has also developed a number of new processes for manufacturing synthetic fuels.

== The ethics of terraforming ==
Zubrin is an advocate of a moderately anthropocentric position in the ethics of terraforming. Zubrin has held debates with his friend Christopher McKay, who advocates a moderately biocentric position on the ethics of terraforming.

== Cultural references ==
In Martin Burckhardt's science fiction novel Score, the Mars Expedition astronauts send 90-year-old Robert Zubrin a video reply thanking him for his work over the years after receiving a congratulatory one from him for their successful landing on Mars.

Zubrin was featured in a 2007 CBC News documentary special, The Passionate Eye, titled "The Mars Underground".

The songwriter and musician Frank Black (alias Black Francis of the Pixies) penned an homage to Zubrin, "Robert Onion", on the album Dog in the Sand. The lyrics are in the form of an acrostic, spelling "Robert The Case for Mars Zubrin".

In 2010, Robert Zubrin was featured in the Symphony of Science video "The Case for Mars" along with Carl Sagan, Brian Cox, and Penelope Boston.

The fictional character Dr. Zachary Walzer in the 2010–2011 independent VODO series Pioneer One was inspired by Zubrin.

In 2016, Zubrin was one of several scientists and engineers interviewed in the National Geographic miniseries Mars.

== Bibliography ==
=== Books ===
- The Case for Mars: The Plan to Settle the Red Planet and Why We Must (1996). ISBN 978-0684835501
- Islands in the Sky: Bold New Ideas for Colonizing Space (1996), co-edited with Stanley Schmidt. ISBN 0-471-13561-5
- From Imagination to Reality: Mars Exploration Studies of the Journal of the British Interplanetary Society: Precursors and Early Piloted Exploration Missions (1997). ISBN 978-0877034261
- From Imagination to Reality: Mars Exploration Studies of the Journal of the British Interplanetary Society: Base Building, Colonization and Terraformation (1997). ISBN 978-0877034285
- Entering Space: Creating a Spacefaring Civilization (1999). ISBN 978-0874779752
- Proceedings of the Founding Convention of the Mars Society (1999), co-edited with Maggie Zubrin. ISBN 978-0912183138
- Mars On Earth: The Adventures of Space Pioneers in the High Arctic (2003). ISBN 978-1585423507
- First Landing (2001). ISBN 978-0441008599
- On to Mars: Colonizing a New World (2002 Apogee Books), co-edited with Frank Crossman. ISBN 978-1896522906
- The Holy Land (2003). ISBN 978-0974144306
- Benedict Arnold: A Drama of the American Revolution in Five Acts (2005). ISBN 978-0874779752
- On to Mars 2: Exploring and Settling a New World (2005 Apogee Books), co-edited with Frank Crossman. ISBN 978-1894959308
- Energy Victory: Winning the War on Terror by Breaking Free of Oil (2007). ISBN 1-59102-591-5
- How to Live on Mars (2008). ISBN 978-0307450111
- Merchants of Despair: Radical Environmentalists, Criminal Pseudo-Scientists, and the Fatal Cult of Antihumanism (2011). ISBN 978-1594035692
- Mars Direct: Space Exploration, the Red Planet, and the Human Future (2013). ISBN 978-1101617861
- The Case for Space: How the Revolution in Spaceflight Opens Up a Future of Limitless Possibility Prometheus Books (2019). ISBN 9781633885356
- The Case for Nukes: How We Can Beat Global Warming and Create a Free, Open, and Magnificent Future (2023). ISBN 978-1736386064
- The New World on Mars: What We Can Create on the Red Planet (2024). ISBN 978-1635768800

=== Articles ===
- 1991, Mars Direct: A Simple, Robust, and Cost Effective Architecture for the Space Exploration Initiative, AIAA Journal
- 2004, Getting Space Exploration Right, The New Atlantis
- 2006, An Energy Revolution, The American Enterprise
- 2007, The Hydrogen Hoax, The New Atlantis
- "Moving the Earth". Science Fact. Analog Science Fiction and Fact. 135 (7&8): 141–143. July–August 2015.
