= In situ resource utilization =

Astronautical use of materials harvested in outer space

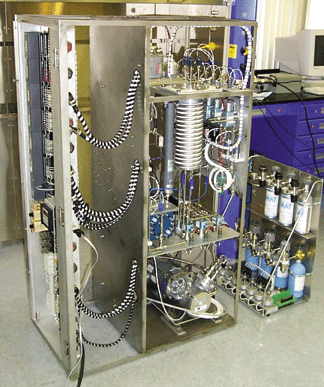
ISRU reverse water gas shift testbed (NASA KSC)

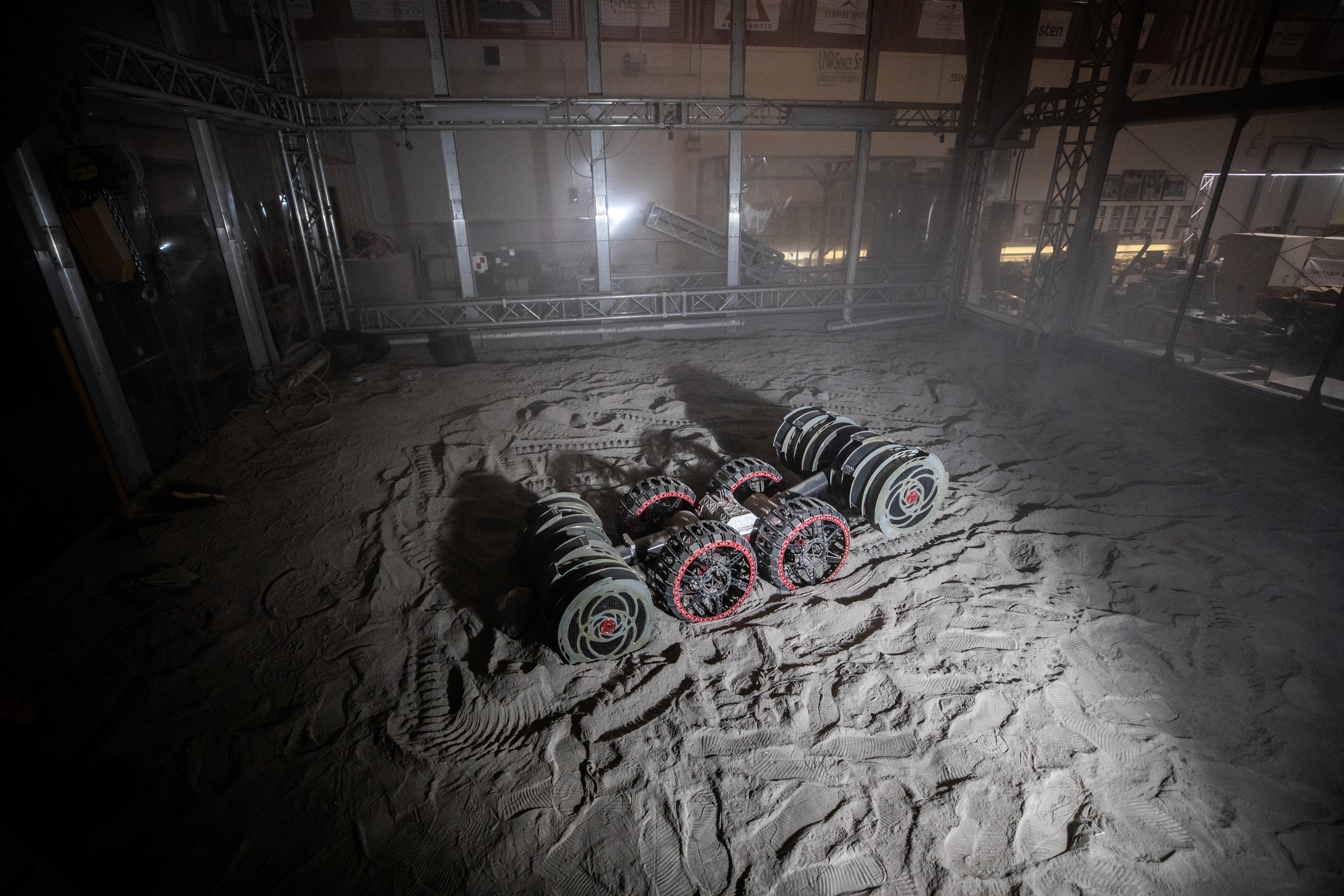
ISRU Pilot Excavator – A NASA project

In space exploration, in situ resource utilization (ISRU) is the practice of collection, processing, storing and use of materials found or manufactured on other astronomical objects (the Moon, Mars, asteroids, etc.) that replace materials that would otherwise be brought from Earth.

ISRU could provide materials for life support, propellants, construction materials, and energy to a spacecraft payloads or space exploration crews. It is now very common for spacecraft and robotic planetary surface mission to harness the solar radiation found in situ in the form of solar panels. The use of ISRU for material production has not yet been implemented in a space mission, though several field tests in the late 2000s demonstrated various lunar ISRU techniques in a relevant environment.

ISRU has long been considered as a possible avenue for reducing the mass and cost of space exploration architectures, in that it may be a way to drastically reduce the amount of payload that must be launched from Earth in order to explore a given planetary body. According to NASA, "in-situ resource utilization will enable the affordable establishment of extraterrestrial exploration and operations by minimizing the materials carried from Earth."

== Uses ==
=== Water ===
In the context of ISRU, water is most often sought directly as fuel or as feedstock for fuel production. Applications include its use in life support, either directly for drinking, for growing food, producing oxygen, or numerous other industrial processes, all of which require a ready supply of water in the environment and the equipment to extract it. Such extraterrestrial water has been discovered in a variety of forms throughout the Solar System, and a number of potential water extraction technologies have been investigated. For water that is chemically bound to regolith, solid ice, or some manner of permafrost, sufficient heating can recover the water. However this is not as easy as it appears because ice and permafrost can often be harder than plain rock, necessitating laborious mining operations. Where there is some level of atmosphere, such as on Mars, water can be extracted directly from the air using a simple process such as WAVAR. Another possible source of water is deep aquifers kept warm by Mars's latent geological heat, which can be tapped to provide both water and geothermal power.

=== Rocket propellant ===
Rocket propellant production has been proposed from the Moon's surface by processing water ice detected at the poles. The likely difficulties include working at extremely low temperatures and extraction of water from the regolith. Most schemes electrolyse the water to produce hydrogen and oxygen and cryogenically store them as liquids. This requires large amounts of equipment and power to achieve. Alternatively, it may be possible to heat water in a nuclear or solar thermal rocket, which may be able to deliver a large mass from the Moon to low Earth orbit (LEO) in spite of the much lower specific impulse, for a given amount of equipment.

The monopropellant hydrogen peroxide (H_{2}O_{2}) can be made from water on Mars and the Moon.

Aluminum as well as other metals has been proposed for use as rocket propellant made using lunar resources, and proposals include reacting the aluminum with water.

For Mars, methane propellant can be manufactured via the Sabatier process. SpaceX has suggested building a propellant plant on Mars that would use this process to produce methane (CH_{4}) and liquid oxygen (O_{2}) from sub-surface water ice and atmospheric CO_{2}.

=== Metals ===
Historically, oxygen has been one of the primary extraction targets when considering space ISRU. The main source of oxygen in space is planetary regolith which, when chemically reduced to extract oxygen also leads to the production of metals as a byproduct. Slightly preceding the announcement of the Artemis program by NASA, the study of processes specifically targeting metal extraction started to become more prevalent. Many use cases have been suggested for metals extracted from off earth resources including as construction materials (Si, Al, Fe, Mg, Ti, Mn, Cr), solid rocket fuel (Al, Mg), energy storage (K, Na, Mn, Ti, Mg, Fe, Al, Si), and thermal fluids and coolants (NaK).

Many processes that have been investigated for metal extraction in space are already established processing routes on Earth, with the exception that space ready designs need to account for the significantly different conditions found in space including gravity, pressure, radiation conditions, supply chain issues, water availability, and need for automation/remote operation.

=== Solar cell production ===
It has long been suggested that solar cells could be produced from the materials present in lunar soil. Silicon, aluminium, and glass, three of the primary materials required for solar cell production, are found in high concentrations in lunar soil and can be used to produce solar cells. In fact, the native vacuum on the lunar surface provides an excellent environment for direct vacuum deposition of thin-film materials for solar cells.

Solar arrays produced on the lunar surface can be used to support lunar surface operations as well as satellites off the lunar surface. Solar arrays produced on the lunar surface may prove more cost effective than solar arrays produced and shipped from Earth, but this trade depends heavily on the location of the particular application in question.

Another potential application of lunar-derived solar arrays is providing power to Earth. In its original form, known as the solar power satellite, the proposal was intended as an alternate power source for Earth. Solar cells would be launched into Earth orbit and assembled, with the resultant generated power being transmitted down to Earth via microwave beams. Despite much work on the cost of such a venture, the uncertainty lay in the cost and complexity of fabrication procedures on the lunar surface.

=== Building materials ===
The colonization of planets or moons will require obtaining local building materials, such as regolith. For example, studies employing artificial Mars soil mixed with epoxy resin and tetraethoxysilane, produce high enough values of strength, resistance, and flexibility parameters.

Asteroid mining could also involve extraction of metals for construction material in space, which may be more cost-effective than bringing such material up out of Earth's deep gravity well, or that of any other large body like the Moon or Mars. Metallic asteroids contain huge amounts of siderophilic metals, including precious metals.

== Locations ==
=== Mars ===
ISRU research for Mars is focused primarily on providing rocket propellant for a return trip to Earth—either for a crewed or a sample return mission—or for use as fuel on Mars. Many of the proposed techniques use the well-characterised atmosphere of Mars as feedstock. Since this can be simulated on Earth, these proposals are relatively simple to implement, though it is by no means certain that NASA or the ESA will favour this approach over a more conventional direct mission.

A typical proposal for ISRU is the use of a Sabatier reaction, CO_{2} + 4H_{2} → CH_{4} + 2H_{2}O, in order to produce methane on the Martian surface, to be used as a propellant. Oxygen is liberated from the water by electrolysis, and the hydrogen recycled back into the Sabatier reaction. The usefulness of this reaction is that—as of 2008, when the availability of water on Mars was less scientifically demonstrated—only the hydrogen (which is light) was thought to need to be brought from Earth.

As of 2018, SpaceX has stated their goal of developing the technology for a Mars propellant plant that could use a variation on what is described in the previous paragraph. Rather than transporting hydrogen from Earth to use in making the methane and oxygen, they have said they plan to mine the requisite water from subsurface water ice, produce and then store the post-Sabatier reactants, and then use it as propellant for return flights of their Starship no earlier than 2023. As of 2023 SpaceX has not produced or published any designs, specifications for any ISRU technology.

A similar reaction proposed for Mars is the reverse water gas shift reaction, CO_{2} + H_{2} → CO + H_{2}O. This reaction takes place rapidly in the presence of an iron-chrome catalyst at 400 °C, and has been implemented in an Earth-based testbed by NASA. Again, hydrogen is recycled from the water by electrolysis, and the reaction only needs a small amount of hydrogen from Earth. The net result of this reaction is the production of oxygen, to be used as the oxidizer component of rocket fuel.

Another reaction proposed for the production of oxygen and fuel is the electrolysis of the atmospheric carbon dioxide,

$\ce{\overset{atmospheric \atop {carbon\ dioxide}}{2CO2} ->[\text{energy}] {2CO} + O2}$

It has also been proposed the in situ production of oxygen, hydrogen and CO from the Martian hematite deposits via a two-step thermochemical CO_{2}/H_{2}O splitting process, and specifically in the magnetite/wüstite redox cycle. Although thermolysis is the most direct, one-step process for splitting molecules, it is neither practical nor efficient in the case of either H_{2}O or CO_{2}. This is because the process requires a very high temperature (> 2,500 °C) to achieve a useful dissociation fraction. This poses problems in finding suitable reactor materials, losses due to vigorous product recombination, and excessive aperture radiation losses when concentrated solar heat is used. The magnetite/wustite redox cycle was first proposed for solar application on earth by Nakamura, and was one of the first used for solar-driven two-step water splitting. In this cycle, water reacts with wustite (FeO) to form magnetite (Fe_{3}O_{4}) and hydrogen. The summarised reactions in this two-step splitting process are as follows:

$$\ce{Fe3O4 ->[\text{energy}] {3FeO} + \overbrace{1/2O2}^{\underset{(\operatorname{by-product})}{oxygen}}}$$

and the obtained FeO is used for the thermal splitting of water or CO_{2} :

3FeO + H_{2}O → Fe_{3}O_{4} + H_{2}
3FeO + CO_{2} → Fe_{3}O_{4} + CO

This process is repeated cyclically. The above process results in a substantial reduction in the thermal input of energy if compared with the most direct, one-step process for splitting molecules.

However, the process needs wüstite (FeO) to start the cycle, but on Mars there is no wustite or at least not in significant amounts. Nevertheless, wustite can be easily obtained by reduction of hematite (Fe_{2}O_{3}) which is an abundant material on Mars, being especially conspicuous are the strong hematite deposits located at Terra Meridiani. The use of wustite from the hematite, abundantly available on Mars, is an industrial process well known on Earth, and is performed by the following two main reduction reactions:

3Fe_{2}O_{3} + H_{2} → 2Fe_{3}O_{4} + H_{2}O
3Fe_{2}O_{3} + CO → 2Fe_{3}O_{4} + CO_{2}

The proposed 2001 Mars Surveyor lander was to demonstrate manufacture of oxygen from the atmosphere of Mars, and test solar cell technologies and methods of mitigating the effect of Martian dust on the power systems, but the project was cancelled. The Mars 2020 rover mission included an ISRU technology demonstrator (the Mars Oxygen ISRU Experiment) that extracted CO_{2} from the atmosphere and successfully produced 5.37 grams of O_{2} over an hour.

It has been suggested that buildings on Mars could be made from basalt as it has good insulating properties. An underground structure of this type would be able to protect life forms against radiation exposure.

All of the resources required to make plastics exist on Mars. Many of these complex reactions are able to be completed from the gases harvested from the martian atmosphere. Traces of free oxygen, carbon monoxide, water and methane are all known to exist. Hydrogen and oxygen can be made by the electrolysis of water, carbon monoxide and oxygen by the electrolysis of carbon dioxide and methane by the Sabatier reaction of carbon dioxide and hydrogen. These basic reactions provide the building blocks for more complex reaction series which are able to make plastics. Ethylene is used to make plastics such as polyethylene and polypropylene and can be made from carbon monoxide and hydrogen:

2CO + 4H_{2} → C_{2}H_{4} + 2H_{2}O.

=== Moon ===
The Moon possesses abundant raw materials that are potentially relevant to a hierarchy of future applications, beginning with the use of lunar materials to facilitate human activities on the Moon itself and progressing to the use of lunar resources to underpin a future industrial capability within the Earth-Moon system. Natural resources include solar power, oxygen, water, hydrogen, and metals.

The lunar highland material anorthite can be used as aluminium ore. Smelters can produce pure aluminium, calcium metal, oxygen and silica glass from anorthite. Raw anorthite is also good for making fiberglass and other glass and ceramic products. One particular processing technique is to use fluorine brought from Earth as potassium fluoride to separate the raw materials from the lunar rocks.

Over twenty different methods have been proposed for oxygen extraction from the lunar regolith. Oxygen is often found in iron-rich lunar minerals and glasses as iron oxide. The oxygen can be extracted by heating the material to temperatures above 900 °C and exposing it to hydrogen gas. The basic equation is: FeO + H_{2} → Fe + H_{2}O. This process has recently been made much more practical by the discovery of significant amounts of hydrogen-containing regolith near the Moon's poles by the Clementine spacecraft.

Lunar materials may also be used as a general construction material, through processing techniques such as sintering, hot-pressing, liquification, and the cast basalt method. Cast basalt is used on Earth for construction of, for example, pipes where a high resistance to abrasion is required. Glass and glass fiber are straightforward to process on the Moon and Mars. Basalt fibre has also been made from lunar regolith simulators.

Successful tests have been performed on Earth using two lunar regolith simulants MLS-1 and MLS-2. In August 2005, NASA contracted for the production of 16 tonnes of simulated lunar soil, or lunar regolith simulant material for research on how lunar soil could be used in situ.

=== Martian moons, Ceres, asteroids ===
Other proposals are based on Phobos and Deimos. These moons are in reasonably high orbits above Mars, have very low escape velocities, and unlike Mars have return delta-v's from their surfaces to LEO which are less than the return from the Moon.

Ceres is further out than Mars, with a higher delta-v, but launch windows and travel times are better, and the surface gravity is just 0.028 g, with a very low escape velocity of 510 m/s. Researchers have speculated that the interior configuration of Ceres includes a water-ice-rich mantle over a rocky core.

Near Earth Asteroids and bodies in the asteroid belt could also be sources of raw materials for ISRU.

=== Planetary atmospheres ===
Proposals have been made for "mining" for rocket propulsion, using what is called a Propulsive Fluid Accumulator. Atmospheric gases like oxygen and argon could be extracted from the atmosphere of planets like the Earth, Mars, and the outer giant planets by Propulsive Fluid Accumulator satellites in low orbit.

== ISRU capability classification (NASA) ==
In October 2004, NASA's Advanced Planning and Integration Office commissioned an ISRU capability roadmap team. The team's report, along with those of 14 other capability roadmap teams, were published 22 May 2005. The report identifies seven ISRU capabilities:

1. resource extraction,
2. material handling and transport,
3. resource processing,
4. surface manufacturing with in situ resources,
5. surface construction,
6. surface ISRU product and consumable storage and distribution, and
7. ISRU unique development and certification capabilities.

The report focuses on lunar and martian environments. It offers a detailed timeline and capability roadmap to 2040 but it assumes lunar landers in 2010 and 2012.

== ISRU technology demonstrators and prototypes ==
The Mars Surveyor 2001 Lander was intended to carry to Mars a test payload, MIP (Mars ISPP Precursor), that was to demonstrate manufacture of oxygen from the atmosphere of Mars, but the mission was cancelled.

The Mars Oxygen ISRU Experiment (MOXIE) is a 1% scale prototype model aboard the Mars 2020 rover Perseverance that produces oxygen from Martian atmospheric carbon dioxide (CO_{2}) in a process called solid oxide electrolysis. The experiment produced its first 5.37 grams of oxygen on 20 April 2021.

The lunar Resource Prospector rover was designed to scout for resources on a polar region of the Moon, and it was proposed to be launched in 2022. The mission concept was in its pre-formulation stage, and a prototype rover was being tested when it was scrapped in April 2018. Its science instruments will be flown instead on several commercial lander missions contracted by NASA's new Commercial Lunar Payload Services (CLSP) program, that aims to focus on testing various lunar ISRU processes by landing several payloads on multiple commercial landers and rovers. The first formal solicitation was expected in 2019. The spiritual successor to the Resource Prospector became VIPER (rover).

== See also ==
- Anthony Zuppero – American nuclear scientist
- Asteroid mining – Exploitation of raw materials from asteroids
- David Criswell – American astronomer (1941–2019)
- Dan Britt – American astrogeologist (born 1950)
- Direct reduced iron – Iron metal made from ore without a blast furnace
- Gerard K. O'Neill – American physicist, author, and inventor (1927–1992)
- Human outpost – Human habitats located in environments inhospitable for humans
- Lunar outpost (NASA) – Concepts for extended human presence on the Moon
- Lunar resources – In situ resources on the Moon
- Lunar water – Presence of water on the Moon
- Lunarcrete – Hypothetical aggregate building material, similar to concrete, formed from lunar regolith
- Mars Design Reference Mission – Conceptual design studies for crewed missions to Mars
- Mars to Stay – Mars colonization architecture proposing no return vehicles
- Planetary protection – Prevention of interplanetary biological contamination
- Planetary surface construction – Construction of structures on planetary surface
- Propellant depot – Cache of propellant used to refuel spacecraft
- Propulsive fluid accumulator – Self-filling orbital rocket fuel depot
- Shackleton Energy Company – American moon mining company
- Space architecture – Architecture of off-planet habitable structures
- Space colonization – Concept of permanent human habitation outside of Earth
- Vision for Space Exploration – 2004 US human space exploration plan
