= Mars regional atmospheric modeling system =

The Mars Regional Atmospheric Modeling System (MRAMS) is a computer program that simulates the circulations of the Martian atmosphere at regional and local scales. MRAMS, developed by Scot Rafkin and Timothy Michaels, is derived from the Regional Atmospheric Modeling System (RAMS) developed by William R. Cotton and Roger A. Pielke to study atmospheric circulations on the Earth.

Key features of MRAMS include a non-hydrostatic, fully compressible dynamics, explicit bin dust, water, and carbon dioxide ice atmospheric physics model, and a fully prognostic regolith model that includes carbon dioxide deposition and sublimation. Several Mars exploration projects, including the Mars Exploration Rovers, the Phoenix Scout Mission, and the Mars Science Laboratory have used MRAMS to study a variety of atmospheric circulations.

The MRAMS operates at the mesoscale and microscale, modeling and simulating the Martian atmosphere. The smaller scale modeling of the MRAMS gives it higher resolution data points and models over complex terrain and topography. It is able to identify topography driven flows like katabatic and anabatic winds through valleys and mountains that produce changes in atmospheric circulation.

== Structure ==
=== Dynamic Core ===
The dynamic core's role is to solve fluid mechanic equations related to atmospheric dynamics. The equations in the dynamic core of the MRAMS are based on primitive grid-volume Reynolds-averaged equations. The related equations are meant to solve for momentum, thermodynamics, tracers, and conservation of mass. The MRAMS dynamical core integrates equations for momentum, thermodynamics (atmosphere-surface heat exchange), tracers, and conservation of mass.

==== Parameterizations ====
The MRAMS dynamical core was developed from RAMS and has been changed excessively to account for the large difference in atmospheres between Mars and Earth. Some MRAMS models parameterize numerous features including dust and dust lifting, cloud microphysics, radiative transfer, and steep topography.

=== Grid ===
The MRAMS operates on the mesoscale and therefore is a regional tool not global, making it accurate for data collection around complex terrain and changing topography. MRAMS uses the Arakawa C-grid. The grid spacing is irregular and requires the use of scaling. The high resolution of the MRAMS stems from the use of the nested two-way grid system. The two-way grid system incorporates a parent grid that establishes initial boundary layers to be used and by the finer grid for accurate data collection.
