= WAVAR =

WAVAR, short for water-vapor adsorption reactor, is a process that has been studied for its potential in directly extracting water from the atmosphere of Mars by alternately blowing air over a zeolite adsorption bed and heating the bed to extract the adsorbed water. An advantage of this process is its mechanical simplicity and applicability to any point on Mars's surface. Its output is not sufficient for industrial purposes such as fuel manufacture, but it may be a useful supplement to life support in some architectures.

== See also ==
- In situ resource utilization
