= Pielke =

Pielke is a surname. Notable people with the surname include:

- Roger A. Pielke (born 1946), American meteorologist
- Roger A. Pielke Jr. (born 1968, son of Roger A. Pielke), American political scientist and professor
- Emil B. Pielke (1942–2008), American politician
