= Regional Atmospheric Modeling System =

The Regional Atmospheric Modeling System (RAMS) is a set of computer programs that simulate the atmosphere for weather and climate research and numerical weather prediction (NWP). Other components include a data analysis and a visualization package.

RAMS was developed in the 1980s at Colorado State University (CSU), spearheaded by William R. Cotton and Roger A. Pielke, for mesoscale meteorological modeling. Subsequent development is primarily done by Robert L. Walko and Craig J. Tremback under the supervision of Cotton and Pielke. It is a comprehensive non-hydrostatic model. It is written primarily in Fortran with some C code and it runs best under the Unix operating system. Version 6 was released in 2009.

RAMS is the basis for a system simulating the Martian atmosphere that is named MRAMS.

== See also ==
- Downscaling
