= Mars surface =

Mars surface could relate to :

- Geology of Mars
- Atmosphere of Mars
