= Roger Pielke =

Roger Pielke may refer to:

- Roger A. Pielke (born 1946), American meteorologist
- Roger A. Pielke Jr. (born 1968), American political scientist
