= Atmosphere-breathing electric propulsion =

Spacecraft propulsion technology

Atmosphere-breathing electric propulsion, or air-breathing electric propulsion, shortly ABEP, is a propulsion technology for spacecraft, which could allow thrust generation in low orbits without the need of on-board propellant, by using residual gases in the atmosphere as propellant. Atmosphere-breathing electric propulsion could make a new class of long-lived, low-orbiting missions feasible.

The concept is currently being investigated by the European Space Agency (ESA), the EU-funded BREATHE project at Sant'Anna School of Advanced Studies in Pisa and the EU-funded DISCOVERER project. Current state-of-the-art conventional electric thrusters cannot maintain flight at low altitudes for any times longer than about 2 years, because of the limitation in propellant storage and in the amount of thrust generated, which force the spacecraft's orbit to decay. The ESA officially announced the first successful RAM-EP prototype on-ground demonstration in March 2018.

== Principle of operation ==
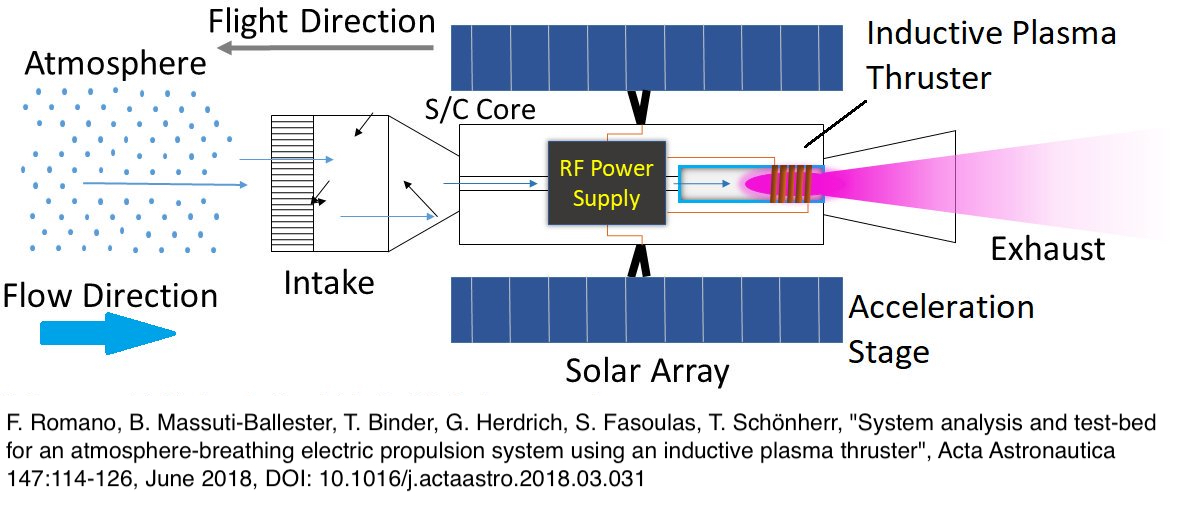
Atmosphere-Breathing Electric Propulsion concept

An ABEP is composed by an intake and an electric thruster: rarefied gases which are responsible for drag in low Earth orbit (LEO) and very low Earth orbit (VLEO), are used as the propellant. This technology would ideally allow spacecraft to orbit at very low altitudes (< 400 km (250 mi)) without the need of on-board propellant, allowing long time missions in a new section of atmosphere's altitudes. This advantage makes the technology of interest for scientific missions, military and civil surveillance services as well as low orbit communication services with even lower latency than Starlink.

A special intake will be used to collect the gas molecules and direct them to the thruster. The molecules will then be ionized by the thruster and expelled from the acceleration stage at a very high velocity, generating thrust. The electric power needed can be provided by the same power subsystems developed for the actual electric propulsion systems, likely a combination of solar arrays and batteries, though other kind of electric power subsystems can be considered. An ABEP could extend the lifetime of satellites in LEO and VLEO by compensating the atmospheric drag during their time of operation. The altitude for an Earth-orbiting ABEP can be optimised between 120–250 km (75–155 mi). This technology could also be utilized on any planet with atmosphere, if the thruster can process other propellants, and if the power source can provide the required power, e.g. sufficient solar irradiation for the solar panels, such as Mars and Venus, otherwise other electric power subsystems such as a space nuclear reactor or radioisotope thermoelectric generator (RTG) have to be implemented, for example for a mission around Titan.

== Concepts and modelling ==
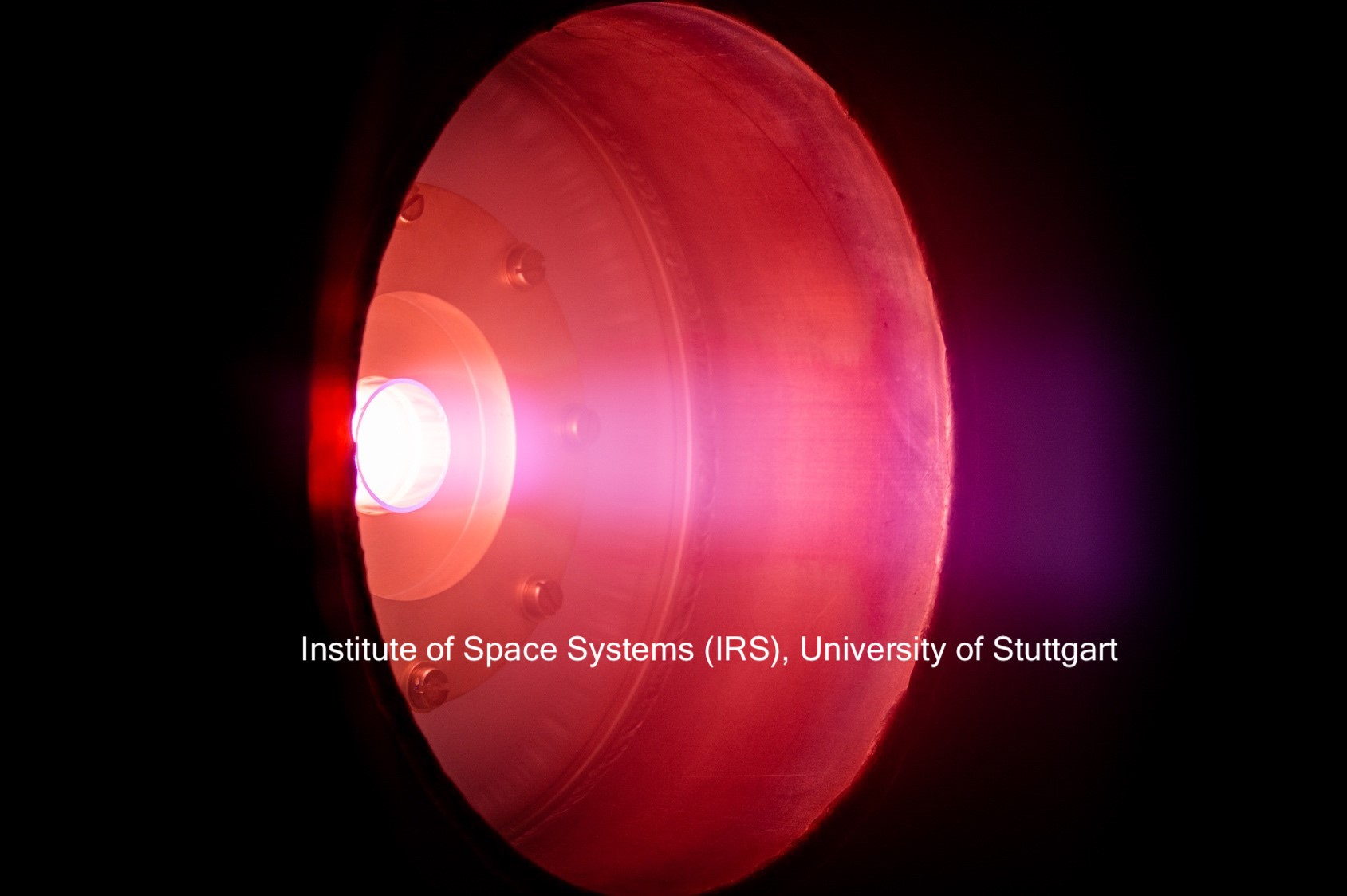
RF Helicon-based Plasma Thruster (IPT) prototype operating on Nitrogen

The first studies considering the collection and use of the upper atmosphere as propellant for an electric thruster can be found dating back to 1959 with the studies on the propulsive fluid accumulator.

In the development of atmosphere-breathing ion engines, a notable extension of Child's Law led to its implementation in the ABEP concept in 1995. Originally, Child's Law modeled the flow of charge between an anode and a cathode with the assumption that the initial velocity of ions was zero. This assumption, however, is not applicable to ion thrusters operating in low Earth orbit, where ambient gas enters the ionization chamber at high velocities.

Buford Ray Conley provided a generalization of Child's Law that accounts for a non-zero initial velocity of ions. This adaptation has been significant for the theoretical modeling of ion propulsion systems, particularly those that operate in the rarefied conditions of low Earth orbit.

The generalization of Child's Law has implications for the design and efficiency of atmosphere-breathing ion thrusters. By accounting for the high-velocity ambient gas that enters the ionization chamber in low Earth orbit, the modified law allows for more accurate theoretical modeling. Once the ambient gas is ionized in the chamber, it is electromagnetically accelerated out of the exhaust, contributing to the propulsion of the spacecraft.

Magnetoplasmaionic (MPI) Engine is being a conceptual atmosphere breathing electric propulsion system that utilizes atmospheric ions and ambient air as a supplementary working medium for plasma-based thrust generation. Its operating principle involves harvesting atmospheric particles, ionizing them to form a high-energy plasma, magnetically confining the charged particles, and accelerating the plasma through electromagnetic fields to generate a directed propulsive force. The proposed architecture integrates key technical components, including an atmospheric intake and ion-harvesting system, plasma ionization chamber, radiofrequency or corona-discharge ionizers, electromagnetic ion separation unit, superconducting magnetic confinement coils, power conditioning and control electronics, and a magnetic nozzle for plasma acceleration and exhaust. By combining these subsystems within a unified propulsion architecture, the MPI Engine aims to enhance propulsion efficiency, reduce dependence on conventional fuels, and support the development of sustainable high-speed transportation and advanced aerospace systems.

== Development and testing ==
=== European projects ===
One of the earliest European assessments of atmosphere-breathing electric propulsion was conducted in 2006 through an ESA internal study, later formalised, proposing the RAM-EP concept for drag compensation in VLEO. The study outlined the use of Hall-effect thrusters or gridded ion engines operating directly on collected atmospheric gases, aiming to eliminate onboard propellant limitations. Due to a lack of experimental data on alternative propellants, the performance models relied on theoretical assumptions. To address this, ESA funded an experimental campaign in 2010, under contract with Alta S.p.A., involving two electric propulsion systems: Snecma’s PPS1350-TSD Hall thruster, and TransMIT's RIT-10 gridded ion engine. These tests marked the first European attempts to operate standard EP systems using simulated atmospheric compositions, specifically nitrogen–oxygen mixtures, and provided key performance data under VLEO-like conditions. Key outcomes included the demonstration that both technologies were, in principle, compatible with atmospheric propellants, though with notable performance degradation compared to xenon. The HET exhibited reduced thrust efficiency and significant lifetime limitations due to oxygen-induced erosion of the anode and ceramic walls, while the RIT-10—tested with titanium grid optics—showed stable operation with only minimal erosion, suggesting lifetimes exceeding 60,000 hours. Additional findings included the limited benefit of xenon seeding, a need for better ionisation efficiency on reactive gases, and the importance of developing advanced cathode and material solutions for ABEP systems.

The RAM-EP system (Rarefied Atmosphere Membrane-Electric Propulsion), developed by SITAEL in collaboration with ESA, is based on a double-stage Hall-effect thruster (RAM-HET) designed to operate using rarefied atmospheric gases at VLEO altitudes. The system includes a passive intake prototype to collect and direct atmospheric particles to the thruster. In 2017, ground-based tests using a particle flow generator to simulate VLEO conditions demonstrated stable ignition of the RAM-HET on a nitrogen–oxygen mixture, with a measured thrust of 6±1 mN and a drag of 26±1 mN, simulating operation at 200 km (120 mi) altitude. Although net positive thrust was not achieved in these tests, the results confirmed the feasibility of air-breathing Hall-effect thrusters for drag-compensated propulsion in VLEO.

The European Union–funded AETHER (Air‑breathing Electric THrustER) project, active from 2019 to 2022 under Horizon 2020, was coordinated by SITAEL with a consortium including the University of Surrey, TransMIT, Von Karman Institute, RHP Technology, and Astos Solutions. AETHER aimed to advance TRL of ABEP systems through system-level integration and validation in VLEO-representative environments.

Through these efforts, AETHER significantly advanced the understanding of air-breathing propulsion elements—intakes, thrusters, cathodes, and materials—in representative VLEO environments, contributing to the narrowing of performance gaps between concept and practical ABEP spacecraft architectures.

The Institute of Space Systems at the University of Stuttgart is developing the intake and the thruster, the latter is the RF helicon-based Plasma Thruster (IPT), which was ignited for the first time in March 2020. Such a device has the main advantage of no components in direct contact with the plasma, this minimizes the performance degradation over time due to erosion from aggressive propellants, such as atomic oxygen in VLEO, and does not require a neutralizer. The intake and thruster were developed within the DISCOVERER EU H2020 project.

Intakes have been designed in multiple studies, and are based on free molecular flow condition and on gas-surface interaction models: based on specular reflections properties of the intake materials, high efficiencies can theoretically be achieved by using telescope-like designs. With fully diffuse reflection properties, efficiencies are generally lower, but with a trapping mechanism the pressure distribution in front of the thruster can be enhanced as well.

Since 2021, the UK-based company NewOrbit Space has reported development work on an air-breathing ion propulsion system based on a radiofrequency ion engine coupled with a radiofrequency cathode. According to company statements, the system was tested in vacuum conditions using atmospheric air as a propellant. Preliminary results suggest specific impulses on the order of 6,000 seconds, although detailed peer-reviewed results are not publicly available.

=== US & Japanese work ===
Busek Co. Inc. in the U.S. patented their concept of an Air Breathing Hall Effect Thruster (ABHET) in 2004. In 2011, with funding from the NASA Institute for Advanced Concepts, a feasibility study was conducted that would be applied to Mars (Mars-ABHET or MABHET) where the system would breathe and ionize atmospheric carbon dioxide. The MABHET concept is based on the same general principles as JAXA's Air Breathing Ion Engine (ABIE) or ESA's RAM-EP.

== See also ==
- Ion-propelled aircraft
- Propulsive fluid accumulator – Self-filling orbital rocket fuel depot
