= Anthony Zuppero =

American nuclear scientist

Anthony Zuppero is an American nuclear scientist who is noted for his work in nuclear thermal rockets using water as the propellant.

Early in his career he worked on nuclear weaponry, including one proposal to try to move a 1 gigatonne nuclear bomb to Russia in under two minutes, which he was able to show was impractical. "Just before he left the Idaho National Engineering and Environmental Laboratory, Department of Energy, where he worked from 1991 through 1998, he was the (de facto) Principal Investigator, Nuclear Space Transport Systems."

Zuppero has proposed nuclear and solar powered steam-propelled spacecraft. He has proposed such vehicles as a means to carry ice and water around the Solar System, rather than take the more energy- and equipment-intensive route of extracting the hydrogen and oxygen. His calculations suggest that this needs two orders of magnitude less equipment, and generates propellant at a far faster rate. Working with Geoffrey Landis, he proposed mining water from the Martian moons Deimos and Phobos, showing that there was an optimum specific impulse for doing so, and later proposed similar techniques to utilize water from Near Earth Asteroids, and from the Moon.
