= Propulsive fluid accumulator =

Self-filling orbital rocket fuel depot

A Propulsive Fluid Accumulator is an artificial Earth satellite which collects and stores oxygen and other atmospheric gases for in-situ refuelling of high-thrust rockets. This eliminates the need to lift oxidizer to orbit and therefore brings significant cost benefits. A major portion of the total world payload sent into low Earth orbit each year is either liquid oxygen or water.

== Propulsive Fluid Accumulator (PROFAC) ==
In the period 1956 to 1963, S.T. Demetriades proposed methods of atmospheric gas accumulation by means of a satellite moving in low Earth orbit, at an altitude of around 120 km, or propellant accumulation by stations on the surface of a planet or by gathering and exploiting interstellar matter. In its simplest form, Demetriades' proposed satellite extracts air from the fringes of the atmosphere, compresses and cools it, and extracts liquid oxygen. The remaining nitrogen is, in part, used as propellant for a nuclear-powered magnetohydrodynamic electromagnetic plasma thruster, which maintains the orbit at about 120 km, or a solar powered thruster (and collection system) for altitudes above 150 km (as stated in the original 1959 JBIS article, p119) compensating for atmospheric drag. This system was called “PROFAC” (PROpulsive Fluid ACcumulator). Several systems were studied, e. g. PROFAC-S for Surface, PROFAC-C for Orbital, PROFAC-A for combination with aerospaceplane making one reusable stage to orbit possible, etc. Several inlets (e. g. conical as in AIEE 10 Aug 1960 San Diego meeting, or funnel) and cryopumps were studied for orbital air collection. The work slowed down in late 1961 although much progress was made in later years on such items as a solar-powered PROFAC.

There are, however, safety concerns with placing a nuclear reactor in low Earth orbit.

== Propellant harvesting of atmospheric resources in orbit (PHARO) ==
Demetriades' proposal was further refined by Christopher Jones and others in 2010. In this proposal, multiple collection vehicles accumulate propellant gases at around 120 km altitude, later transferring them to a higher orbit. However, Jones' proposal does require a network of orbital power-beaming satellites, to avoid placing nuclear reactors in orbit.

== Harvesting at about 200 kilometers altitude (LOX-LEO) ==
Klinkman and Wilkes proposed, at the AIAA Space 2007 and Space 2009 conferences, that gases could be harvested at the very edge of the Earth's atmosphere by a high vacuum pump. An ion propulsion engine would consume a portion of the harvested gases and would restore the spacecraft's orbital momentum. Klinkman's proposal has a fairly low energy threshold for a small-scale harvesting operation, and air friction is far more forgiving at 200 km than at 100 km.

Note that S. T. Demetriades pioneered in space propulsion, from the atomic oxygen ramjet (he proved it not feasible in the 1950s) to nuclear, ion, and plasma thrusters. He received the 2010 AIAA Award for Plasmadynamics and Lasers.

== Propellant depots ==
Boeing has suggested a non-extractive propellant depot, or "space gas station," which accumulates material launched from the planet at low cost, allowing future lunar missions without the need for large launch vehicles like the Saturn V. MIT has recently proposed a similar plan which would store emergency fuel reserves left over from lunar missions.

== See also ==
- Atmosphere-breathing electric propulsion
