= William R. Cotton =

American scientist and educator

- Born: 1940 (age 85–86); United States
- Education: University at Albany, The State University of New York (B.A., 1964; M.S., 1966); Pennsylvania State University (Ph.D., 1970)
- Known for: Cloud physics, storm and cloud dynamics, Regional Atmospheric Modeling System (RAMS), human impact on weather and climate
- Awards: Engineering Dean's Council Award for Excellent in Atmospheric Research (1986), College of Engineering Abell Faculty Research and Graduate Program Award (1991), Pennsylvania State University College of Mineral Sciences Charles L. Hosler Alumni Scholar Medal (1999), Fellow, American Meteorological Society
- Scientific career
- Fields: Meteorology, Climatology
- Workplaces: Colorado State University

William R. Cotton is an American cloud physicist and mesoscale meteorology educator. He is a professor emeritus in the Department of Atmospheric Science at the Colorado State University (CSU).

== Background ==
Cotton earned a B.A. in mathematics at University at Albany, The State University of New York (SUNY) in 1964, a M.S. in meteorology at SUNY in 1966, and a Ph.D. in meteorology at Pennsylvania State University (PSU) in 1970. He was appointed to the academic faculty at the CSU Department of Atmospheric Science in 1974. He assumed the position of an assistant professor in the department where he is now a tenured professor. He has been actively involved in observation and computer simulation of cumulus clouds and thunderstorms as well as other intermediate-scale cloud systems. His current interests are largely in the area of observation and modeling of larger clusters of thunderstorms that occur preferentially at night over the central United States, the simulation of severe thunderstorms including tornadoes and the application of the RAMS cloud-resolving atmospheric model to forecasting agriculture and aviation impact variables. He has held positions at the Experimental Meteorological Laboratory (ERL), the National Oceanic and Atmospheric Administration (NOAA), and the United States Department of Commerce, and served as the head of the Numerical Simulation Group from 1970 to 1974. In 2010 Cotton became professor emeritus.

== Mesoscale modeling ==
Working with students who provided coding expertise as well as original scientific insights (including Chaing Chen, Piotr J. Flatau, Michael D. Moran, Jerome Schmidt, Craig J. Tremback, Gregory Tripoli) he developed one of the first comprehensive mesoscale weather forecast models in the U.S. – the Regional Atmospheric Modeling System (RAMS). This modelling system was subsequently merged with a smaller subset of the code based on the mesoscale model developed independently by Roger A. Pielke for his Ph.D. research related to sea breeze studies and subsequently with his students at the Colorado State University. RAMS has been used as a basis for other weather forecasting systems.

Cotton indicated skepticism of the level of anthropogenic global warming, stating that it is an open question if human produced changes in climate are large enough to be detected from the noise of the natural variability of the climate system. His book, Human impacts on weather and climate, has been linked with conservative think tanks.

== Publications ==
Professor Cotton has published more than 120 papers in peer-reviewed journals, seven chapters in books, co-authored three books, and authored one book. Well known include:

- Cotton, W.R. and R.A. Anthes, 1992: Storm and Cloud Dynamics (International Geophysics Series), Academic Press, San Diego, New York (2nd Edition, 2011)
- Cotton, W.R. and R.A. Pielke, 1995: Human impacts on weather and climate, Cambridge University Press, New York (2nd Edition, 2007)
- Pielke, R.A, W.R. Cotton and others, 1992: A comprehensive meteorological modeling system—RAMS, Meteorol. Atmos. Phys. 49, 69-91
