= Atmosphere of Mars =

Gas layer surrounding Mars

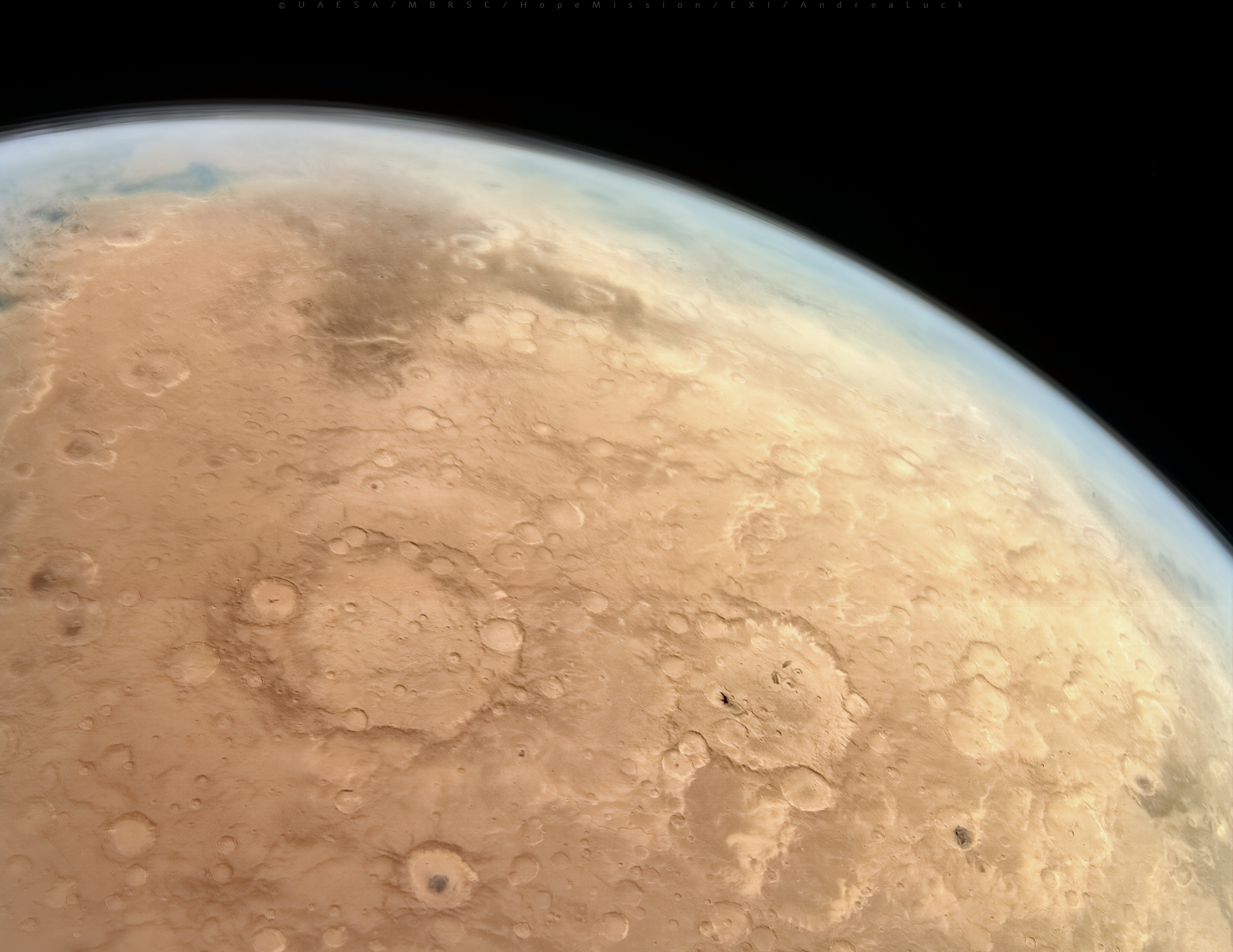
- Image of Mars and its thin atmosphere, photographed by Emirates Mars Mission

General information
- Average surface pressure: 610 Pa (0.088 psi; 4.6 mmHg; 0.0060 atm)
- Mass: 2.5×10^{16} kg

Composition
- Carbon dioxide: 95%
- Nitrogen: 2.8%
- Argon: 2%
- Oxygen: 0.174%
- Carbon monoxide: 0.0747%
- Water vapor: 0.03% (variable)

The atmosphere of Mars is the layer of gasses surrounding the planet Mars. It is primarily composed of carbon dioxide (95%), molecular nitrogen (2.85%), and argon (2%). It also contains trace levels of water vapor, oxygen, carbon monoxide, hydrogen, and noble gases. The atmosphere of Mars is much colder and thinner than Earth's, with an average temperature of −59 °C (−74 °F), and a surface pressure of about 610 pascals (0.088 psi), which is about 0.6% of the Earth's value.

The density at the surface of Mars varies between about 10 and 20 g/m^{3}, which is only 1–2% of Earth's value. The density is about 25% lower during the southern winter than in spring and autumn because carbon dioxide freezes into a dry ice cap at the south pole, an effect that is smaller during the northern winter because of the highly eccentric orbit of Mars. The low pressure of the Martian atmosphere prohibits the existence of liquid water on the surface of Mars, but many studies suggest that the Martian atmosphere was much thicker in the past. The atmosphere of Mars has been losing mass to space since the planet's core slowed down, and the leakage of gases continues today.

The atmosphere of Mars is colder than Earth's owing to the larger distance from the Sun, receiving less solar energy and has a lower effective temperature, which is about 210 K (−63 °C; −82 °F). The average surface emission temperature of Mars is just 215 K (−58 °C; −73 °F), which is comparable to inland Antarctica. Although Mars's atmosphere consists primarily of carbon dioxide, the greenhouse effect in the Martian atmosphere is much weaker than Earth's: 5 °C (9.0 °F) on Mars, versus 33 °C (59 °F) on Earth due to the much lower density of carbon dioxide, leading to less greenhouse warming. Furthermore, the Martian atmosphere contains much less water vapor than Earth's atmosphere, and water vapor is another important contributor to the greenhouse effect. The daily range of temperature in the lower atmosphere presents ample variation due to the low thermal inertia; it can range from −75 °C (−103 °F) to near 0 °C (32 °F) near the surface in some regions. The temperature of the upper part of the Martian atmosphere is also significantly lower than Earth's because of the absence of stratospheric ozone and the radiative cooling effect of carbon dioxide at higher altitudes.

Dust devils and dust storms are prevalent on Mars, which are sometimes observable by telescopes from Earth, and in 2018 even with the naked eye as a change in colour and brightness of the planet. Planet-encircling dust storms (global dust storms) occur on average every 5.5 Earth years (every 3 Martian years) on Mars and can threaten the operation of Mars rovers. However, the mechanism responsible for the development of large dust storms is still not well understood. It has been suggested to be loosely related to gravitational influence of both moons, somewhat similar to the creation of tides on Earth.

The Martian atmosphere is an oxidized atmosphere. The photochemical reactions in the atmosphere tend to oxidize the organic species and turn them into carbon dioxide or carbon monoxide. Although the most sensitive methane probe on the recently launched ExoMars Trace Gas Orbiter failed to find methane in the atmosphere over the whole of Mars, several previous missions and ground-based telescopes detected unexpected levels of methane in the Martian atmosphere, which may even be a biosignature for life on Mars. However, the interpretation of the measurements is still highly controversial and lacks a scientific consensus.

== Atmospheric evolution ==
The mass and composition of the Martian atmosphere are thought to have changed over the course of the planet's lifetime. A thicker, warmer and wetter atmosphere is required to explain several apparent features in the earlier history of Mars, such as the existence of liquid water bodies. Observations of the Martian upper atmosphere, measurements of isotopic composition and analyses of Martian meteorites, provide evidence of the long-term changes of the atmosphere and constraints for the relative importance of different processes.

=== Atmosphere in the early history ===
Isotopic ratio of different species in Martian and Earth's atmosphere
Isotopic ratio	Mars	Earth	Mars / Earth
D / H (in H_{2}O)	9.3 ± 1.7 10^{−4}	1.56 10^{−4}	~6
^{12}C / ^{13}C	85.1 ± 0.3	89.9	0.95
^{14}N / ^{15}N	173 ± 9	272	0.64
^{16}O / ^{18}O	476 ± 4.0	499	0.95
^{36}Ar / ^{38}Ar	4.2 ± 0.1	5.305 ± 0.008	0.79
^{40}Ar / ^{36}Ar	1900 ± 300	298.56 ± 0.31	~6
C / ^{84}Kr	(4.4–6) × 10^{6}	4 × 10^{7}	~0.1
^{129}Xe / ^{132}Xe	2.5221 ± 0.0063	0.97	~2.5

In general, the gases found on modern Mars are depleted in lighter stable isotopes, indicating the Martian atmosphere has changed by some mass-selected processes over its history. Scientists often rely on these measurements of isotope composition to reconstruct conditions of the Martian atmosphere in the past.

While Mars and Earth have similar ^{12}C / ^{13}C and ^{16}O / ^{18}O ratios, ^{14}N is much more depleted in the Martian atmosphere. It is thought that the photochemical escape processes are responsible for the isotopic fractionation and has caused a significant loss of nitrogen on geological timescales. Estimates suggest that the initial partial pressure of N_{2} may have been up to 30 hPa.

Hydrodynamic escape in the early history of Mars may explain the isotopic fractionation of argon and xenon. On modern Mars, the atmosphere is not leaking these two noble gases to outer space owing to their heavier mass. However, the higher abundance of hydrogen in the Martian atmosphere and the high fluxes of extreme UV from the young Sun, together could have driven a hydrodynamic outflow and dragged away these heavy gases. Hydrodynamic escape also contributed to the loss of carbon, and models suggest that it is possible to lose 1,000 hPa (1 bar) of CO_{2} by hydrodynamic escape in one to ten million years under much stronger solar extreme UV on Mars. Meanwhile, more recent observations made by the MAVEN orbiter suggested that sputtering escape is very important for the escape of heavy gases on the nightside of Mars and could have contributed to 65% loss of argon in the history of Mars.

The Martian atmosphere is particularly prone to impact erosion owing to the low escape velocity of Mars. An early computer model suggested that Mars could have lost 99% of its initial atmosphere by the end of late heavy bombardment period based on a hypothetical bombardment flux estimated from lunar crater density. In terms of relative abundance of carbon, the C / ^{84}Kr ratio on Mars is only 10% of that on Earth and Venus. Assuming the three rocky planets have the same initial volatile inventory, then this low C / ^{84}Kr ratio implies the mass of CO_{2} in the early Martian atmosphere should have been ten times higher than the present value. The huge enrichment of radiogenic ^{40}Ar over primordial ^{36}Ar is also consistent with the impact erosion theory.

One of the ways to estimate the amount of water lost by hydrogen escape in the upper atmosphere is to examine the enrichment of deuterium over hydrogen. Isotope-based studies estimate that 12 m to over 30 m global equivalent layer of water has been lost to space via hydrogen escape in Mars's history. It is noted that atmospheric-escape-based approach only provides the lower limit for the estimated early water inventory.

To explain the coexistence of liquid water and faint young Sun during early Mars's history, a much stronger greenhouse effect must have occurred in the Martian atmosphere to warm the surface up above freezing point of water. Carl Sagan first proposed that a 1 bar H_{2} atmosphere can produce enough warming for Mars. The hydrogen can be produced by the vigorous outgassing from a highly reduced early Martian mantle and the presence of CO_{2} and water vapor can lower the required abundance of H_{2} to generate such a greenhouse effect. Nevertheless, photochemical modeling showed that maintaining an atmosphere with this high level of H_{2} is difficult. SO_{2} has also been one of the proposed effective greenhouse gases in the early history of Mars. However, other studies suggested that high solubility of SO_{2}, efficient formation of H_{2}SO_{4} aerosol and surface deposition prohibit the long-term build-up of SO_{2} in the Martian atmosphere, and hence reduce the potential warming effect of SO_{2}.

=== Atmospheric escape on modern Mars ===
Despite the lower gravity, Jeans escape is not efficient in the modern Martian atmosphere due to the relatively low temperature at the exobase (≈200 K at 200 km altitude). It can only explain the escape of hydrogen from Mars. Other non-thermal processes are needed to explain the observed escape of oxygen, carbon and nitrogen.

==== Hydrogen escape ====
Molecular hydrogen (H_{2}) is produced from the dissociation of H_{2}O or other hydrogen-containing compounds in the lower atmosphere and diffuses to the exosphere. The exospheric H_{2} then decomposes into hydrogen atoms, and the atoms that have sufficient thermal energy can escape from the gravitation of Mars (Jeans escape). The escape of atomic hydrogen is evident from the UV spectrometers on different orbiters. While most studies suggested that the escape of hydrogen is close to diffusion-limited on Mars, more recent studies suggest that the escape rate is modulated by dust storms and has a large seasonality. The estimated escape flux of hydrogen range from 10^{7} cm^{−2} s^{−1} to 10^{9} cm^{−2} s^{−1}.

==== Carbon escape ====
Photochemistry of CO_{2} and CO in ionosphere can produce CO_{2}^{+} and CO^{+} ions, respectively:

CO_{2} + hν ⟶ CO^{+}_{2} + e^{−}
CO + hν ⟶ CO^{+} + e^{−}

An ion and an electron can recombine and produce electronic-neutral products. The products gain extra kinetic energy due to the Coulomb attraction between ions and electrons. This process is called dissociative recombination. Dissociative recombination can produce carbon atoms that travel faster than the escape velocity of Mars, and those moving upward can then escape the Martian atmosphere:

CO^{+} + e^{−} ⟶ C + O
CO^{+}_{2} + e^{−} ⟶ C + O_{2}

UV photolysis of carbon monoxide is another crucial mechanism for the carbon escape on Mars:

CO + hν (λ < 116 nm) ⟶ C + O.

Other potentially important mechanisms include the sputtering escape of CO_{2} and collision of carbon with fast oxygen atoms. The estimated overall escape flux is about 0.6 × 10^{7} cm^{−2} s^{−1} to 2.2 × 10^{7} cm^{−2} s^{−1} and depends heavily on solar activity.

==== Nitrogen escape ====
Like carbon, dissociative recombination of N_{2}^{+} is important for the nitrogen escape on Mars. In addition, other photochemical escape mechanism also play an important role:

N_{2} + hν ⟶ N^{+} + N + e^{−}
N_{2} + e^{−} ⟶ N^{+} + N + 2e^{−}

Nitrogen escape rate is very sensitive to the mass of the atom and solar activity. The overall estimated escape rate of ^{14}N is 4.8 × 10^{5} cm^{−2} s^{−1}.

==== Oxygen escape ====
Dissociative recombination of CO_{2}^{+} and O_{2}^{+} (produced from CO_{2}^{+} reaction as well) can generate the oxygen atoms that travel fast enough to escape:

CO^{+}_{2} + e^{−} ⟶ CO + O
CO^{+}_{2} + O ⟶ O^{+}_{2} + CO
O^{+}_{2} + e^{−} ⟶ O + O

However, the observations showed that there are not enough fast oxygen atoms in the Martian exosphere as predicted by the dissociative recombination mechanism. Model estimations of oxygen escape rate suggested it can be over 10 times lower than the hydrogen escape rate. Ion pick and sputtering have been suggested as the alternative mechanisms for the oxygen escape, but this model suggests that they are less important than dissociative recombination at present.

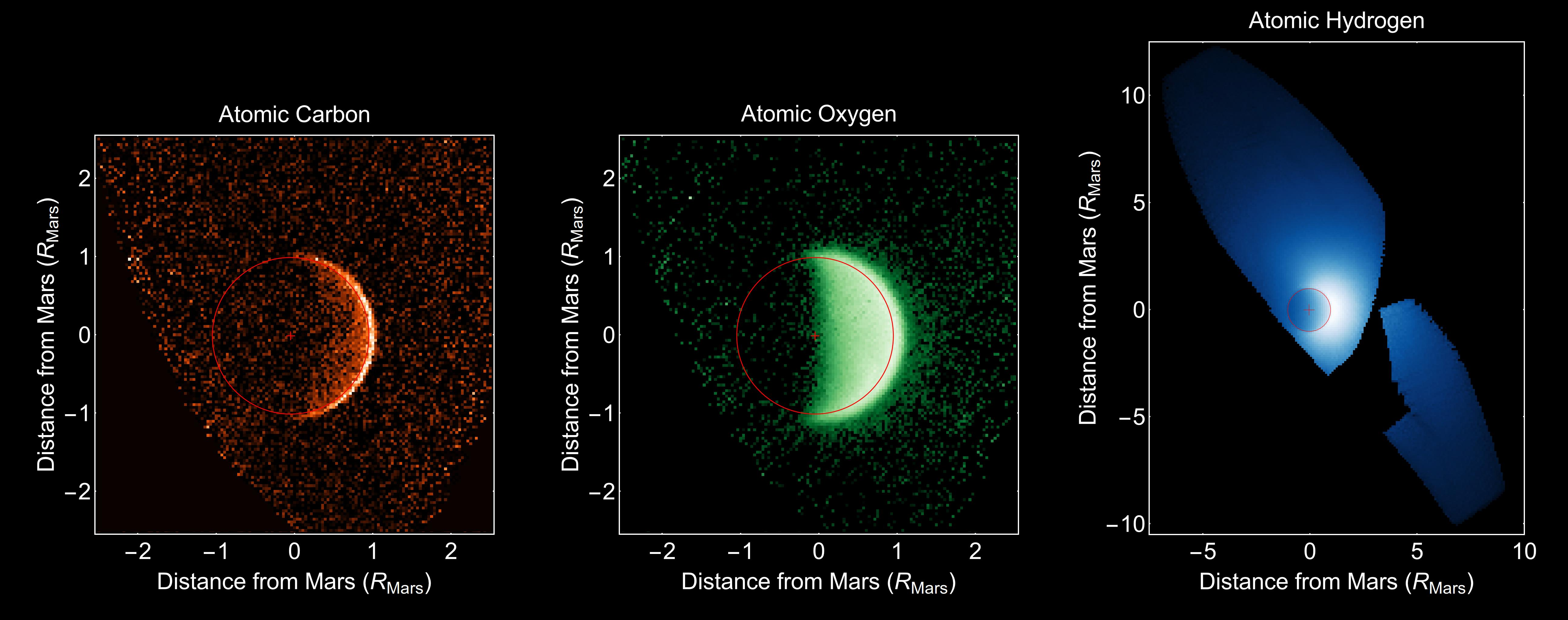
Mars's escaping atmosphere—carbon, oxygen, hydrogen—measured by MAVEN's UV spectrograph).

=== Ionospheric escape ===
The interaction of the solar wind and the interplanetary magnetic field with the Martian conductive ionosphere induces electrodynamic currents, that have been mapped and studied in detail, using MAVEN. These currents can drive the ionospheric species to high altitudes, where the solar wind is able to sweep them away from the planet, resulting to global scale ion outflows. They are however not sufficient to explain the atmospheric and ionospheric losses of Mars over its lifetime.

== Current chemical composition ==
=== Carbon dioxide ===
CO_{2} is the main component of the Martian atmosphere. It has a mean volume (molar) ratio of 94.9%. In winter polar regions, the surface temperature can be lower than the frost point of CO_{2.} CO_{2} gas in the atmosphere can condense on the surface to form 1–2 m thick solid dry ice. In summer, the polar dry ice cap can undergo sublimation and release the CO_{2} back to the atmosphere. As a result, significant annual variability in atmospheric pressure (≈25%) and atmospheric composition can be observed on Mars. The condensation process can be approximated by the Clausius–Clapeyron relation for CO_{2}.

There also exists the potential for adsorption of CO_{2} into and out of the regolith to contribute to the annual atmospheric variability. Although the sublimation and deposition of CO_{2} ice in the polar caps is the driving force behind seasonal cycles, other processes such as dust storms, atmospheric tides, and transient eddies also play a role. Understanding each of these more minor processes and how they contribute to the overall atmospheric cycle will give a clearer picture as to how the Martian atmosphere works as a whole. It has been suggested that the regolith on Mars has high internal surface area, implying that it might have a relatively high capacity for the storage of adsorbed gas. Since adsorption works through the adhesion of a film of molecules onto a surface, the amount of surface area for any given volume of material is the main contributor for how much adsorption can occur. A solid block of material, for example, would have no internal surface area, but a porous material, like a sponge, would have high internal surface area. Given the loose, finely grained nature of the Martian regolith, there is the possibility of significant levels of CO_{2} adsorption into it from the atmosphere. Adsorption from the atmosphere into the regolith has previously been proposed as an explanation for the observed cycles in the methane and water mixing ratios. More research is needed to help determine if CO_{2} adsorption is occurring, and if so, the extent of its impact on the overall atmospheric cycle.

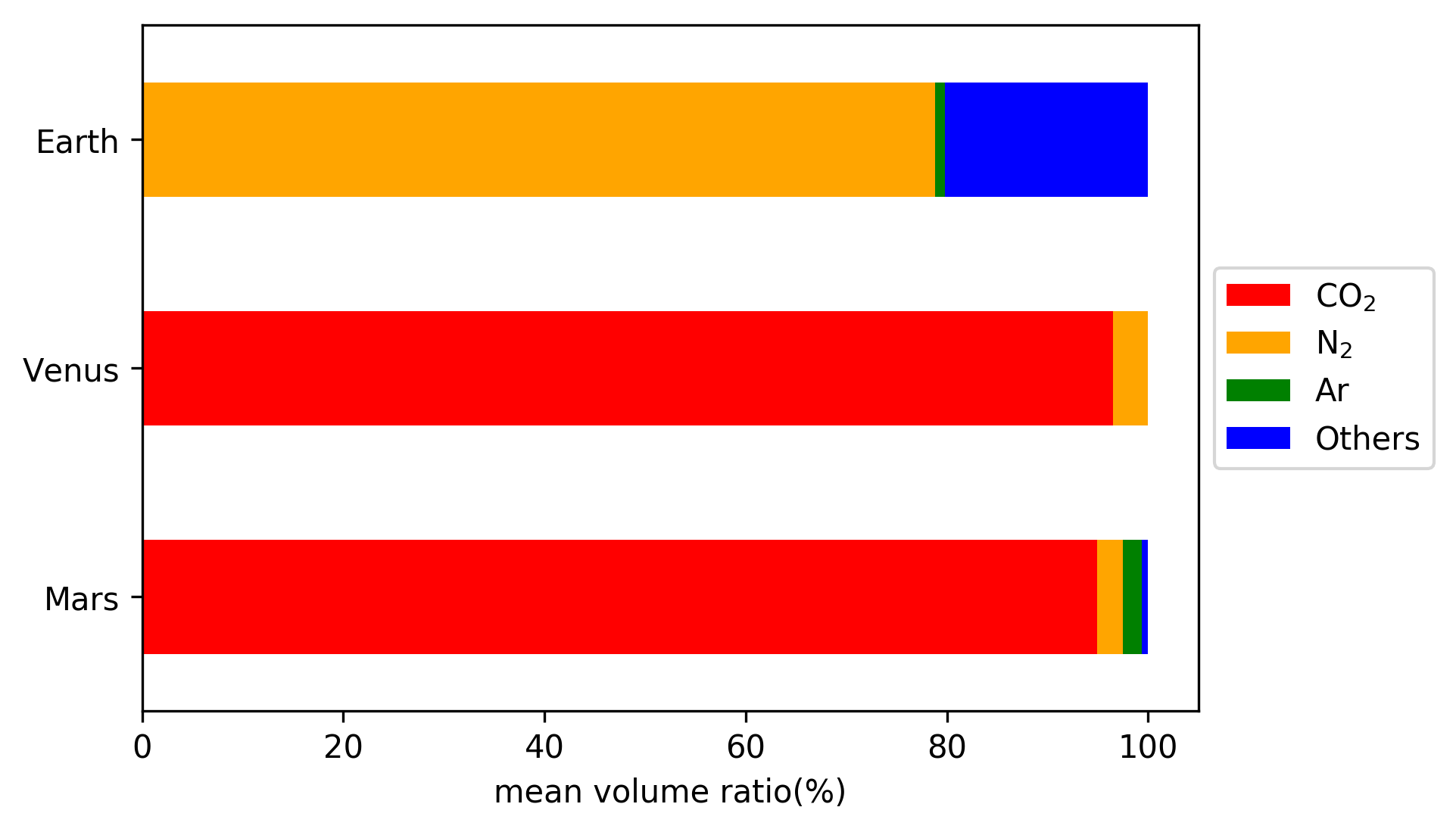
Comparison of the abundance of carbon dioxide, nitrogen, and argon in the atmospheres of Earth, Venus, and Mars

Despite the high concentration of CO_{2} in the Martian atmosphere, the greenhouse effect is relatively weak on Mars (about 5 °C) because of the low concentration of water vapor and low atmospheric pressure. While water vapor in Earth's atmosphere has the largest contribution to greenhouse effect on modern Earth, it is present in only very low concentration in the Martian atmosphere. Moreover, under low atmospheric pressure, greenhouse gases cannot absorb infrared radiation effectively because the pressure-broadening effect is weak.

In the presence of solar UV radiation (hν, photons with wavelength shorter than 225 nm), CO_{2} in the Martian atmosphere can be photolyzed via the following reaction:

CO_{2} + hν (λ < 225 nm) ⟶ CO + O.

If there is no chemical production of CO_{2}, all the CO_{2} in the current Martian atmosphere would be removed by photolysis in about 3,500 years. The hydroxyl radicals (OH) produced from the photolysis of water vapor, together with the other odd hydrogen species (e.g. H, HO_{2}), can convert carbon monoxide (CO) back to CO_{2}. The reaction cycle can be described as:

CO + OH ⟶ CO_{2} + H
H + O_{2} + M ⟶ HO_{2} + M
HO_{2} + O ⟶ OH + O_{2}
Net: CO + O ⟶ CO_{2}

Mixing also plays a role in regenerating CO_{2} by bringing the O, CO, and O_{2} in the upper atmosphere downward. The balance between photolysis and redox production keeps the average concentration of CO_{2} stable in the modern Martian atmosphere.

CO_{2} ice clouds can form in winter polar regions and at very high altitudes (>50 km) in tropical regions, where the air temperature is lower than the frost point of CO_{2}.

=== Nitrogen ===
N_{2} is the second most abundant gas in the Martian atmosphere. It has a mean volume ratio of 2.6%. Various measurements showed that the Martian atmosphere is enriched in ^{15}N. The enrichment of heavy isotopes of nitrogen is possibly caused by mass-selective escape processes.

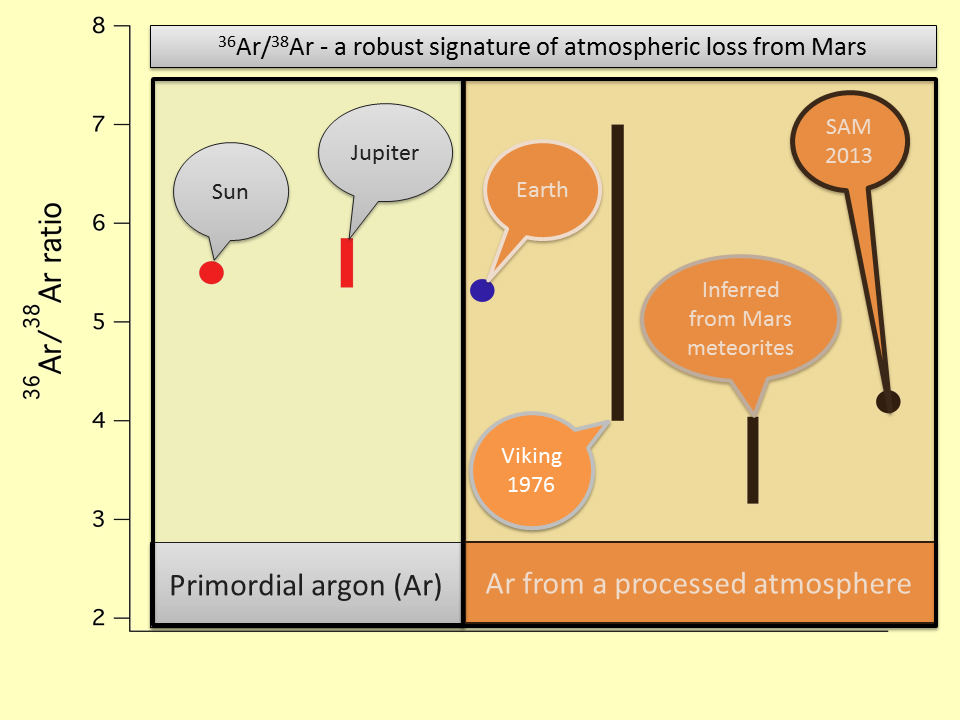
Argon isotope ratios are a signature of atmospheric loss on Mars.

=== Argon ===
Argon is the third most abundant gas in the Martian atmosphere. It has a mean volume ratio of 1.9%. In terms of stable isotopes, Mars is enriched in ^{38}Ar relative to ^{36}Ar, which can be attributed to hydrodynamic escape.

One of Argon's isotopes, ^{40}Ar, is produced from the radioactive decay of ^{40}K. In contrast, ^{36}Ar is primordial: It was present in the atmosphere after the formation of Mars. Observations indicate that Mars is enriched in ^{40}Ar relative to ^{36}Ar, which cannot be attributed to mass-selective loss processes. A possible explanation for the enrichment is that a significant amount of primordial atmosphere, including ^{36}Ar, was lost by impact erosion in the early history of Mars, while ^{40}Ar was emitted to the atmosphere after the impact.

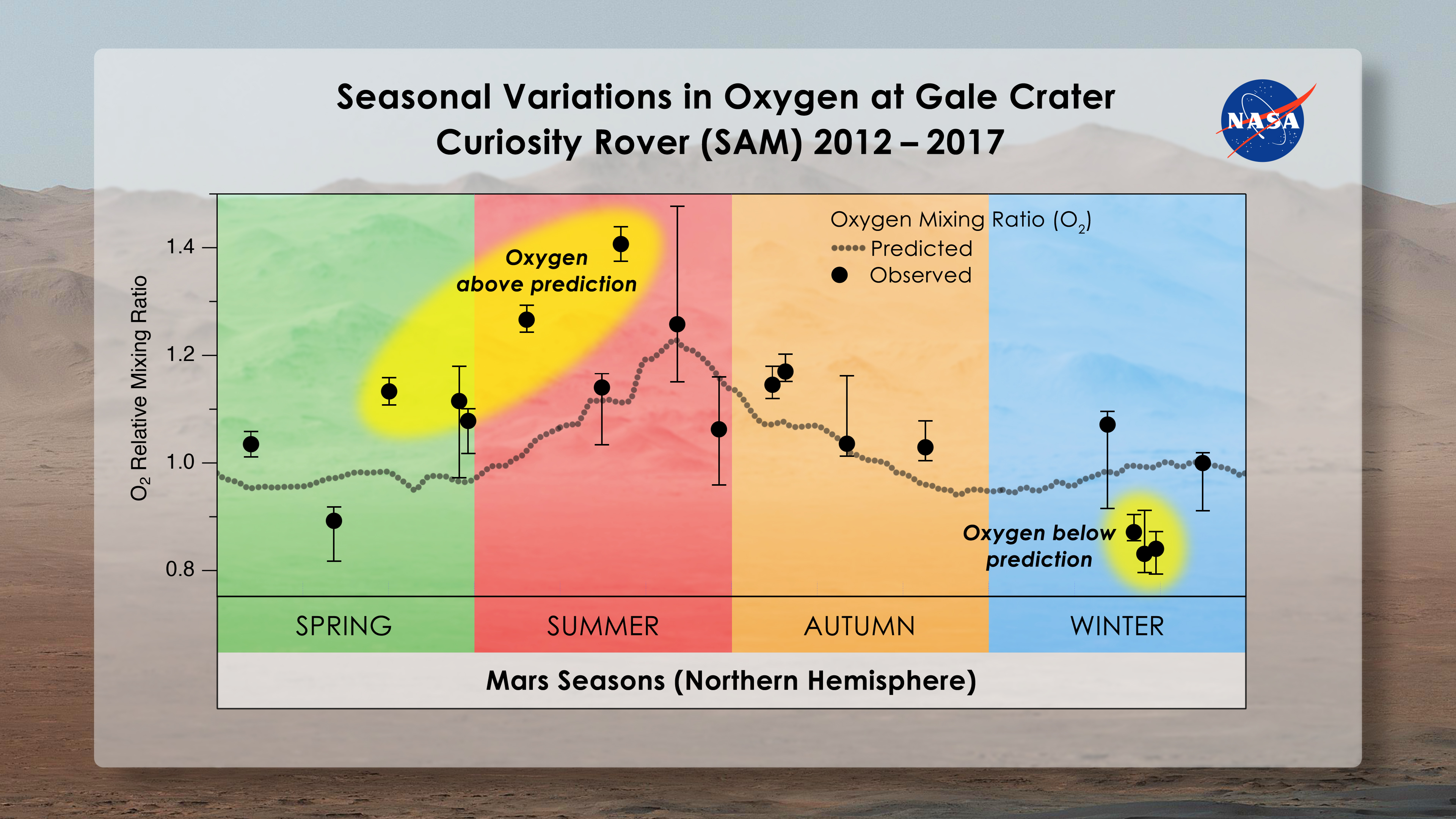
Seasonal variations of oxygen at Gale crater

=== Oxygen and ozone ===
The estimated mean volume ratio of molecular oxygen (O_{2}) in the Martian atmosphere is 0.174%. It is one of the products of the photolysis of CO_{2}, water vapor, and ozone (O_{3}). It can react with atomic oxygen (O) to re-form ozone (O_{3}). In 2010, the Herschel Space Observatory detected molecular oxygen in the Martian atmosphere.

Atomic oxygen is produced by photolysis of CO_{2} in the upper atmosphere and can escape the atmosphere via dissociative recombination or ion pickup. In early 2016, Stratospheric Observatory for Infrared Astronomy (SOFIA) detected atomic oxygen in the atmosphere of Mars, which has not been found since the Viking and Mariner mission in the 1970s.

In 2019, NASA scientists working on the Curiosity rover mission, who have been taking measurements of the gas, discovered that the amount of oxygen in the Martian atmosphere rose by 30% in spring and summer.

Similar to stratospheric ozone in Earth's atmosphere, the ozone present in the Martian atmosphere can be destroyed by catalytic cycles involving odd hydrogen species:

H + O_{3} ⟶ OH + O_{2}
O + OH ⟶ H + O_{2}
Net: O + O_{3} ⟶ 2O_{2}

Since water is an important source of these odd hydrogen species, higher abundance of ozone is usually observed in the regions with lower water vapor content. Measurements showed that the total column of ozone can reach 2–30 μm-atm around the poles in winter and spring, where the air is cold and has low water saturation ratio. The actual reactions between ozone and odd hydrogen species may be further complicated by the heterogeneous reactions that take place in water-ice clouds.

It is thought that the vertical distribution and seasonality of ozone in the Martian atmosphere is driven by the complex interactions between chemistry and transport of oxygen-rich air from sunlit latitudes to the poles. The UV/IR spectrometer on Mars Express (SPICAM) has shown the presence of two distinct ozone layers at low-to-mid latitudes. These comprise a persistent, near-surface layer below an altitude of 30 km (19 mi), a separate layer that is only present in northern spring and summer with an altitude varying from 30 to 60 km, and another separate layer that exists 40–60 km above the southern pole in winter, with no counterpart above the Mars's north pole. This third ozone layer shows an abrupt decrease in elevation between 75 and 50 degrees south. SPICAM detected a gradual increase in ozone concentration at 50 km (31 mi) until midwinter, after which it slowly decreased to very low concentrations, with no layer detectable above 35 km (22 mi).

=== Water vapor ===
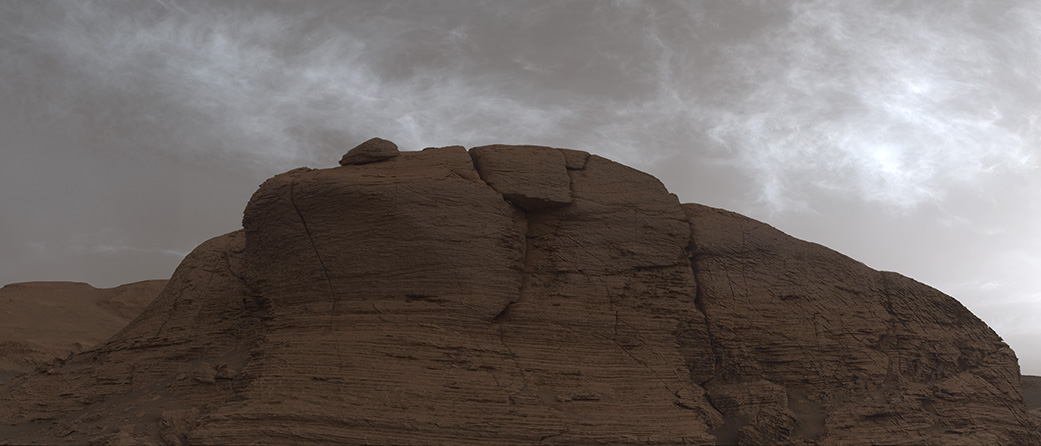
Clouds observed by NASA's Curiosity rover

Water vapor is a trace gas in the Martian atmosphere and has huge spatial, diurnal and seasonal variability. Measurements made by Viking orbiter in the late 1970s suggested that the entire global total mass of water vapor is equivalent to about 1 to 2 km^{3} of ice. More recent measurements by Mars Express orbiter showed that the globally annually-averaged column abundance of water vapor is about 10–20 precipitable microns (pr. μm). Maximum abundance of water vapor (50-70 pr. μm) is found in the northern polar regions in early summer due to the sublimation of water ice in the polar cap.

Unlike in Earth's atmosphere, liquid-water clouds cannot exist in the Martian atmosphere; this is because of the low atmospheric pressure. Cirrus-like water-ice clouds have been observed by the cameras on Opportunity rover and Phoenix lander. Measurements made by the Phoenix lander showed that water-ice clouds can form at the top of the planetary boundary layer at night and precipitate back to the surface as ice crystals in the northern polar region.

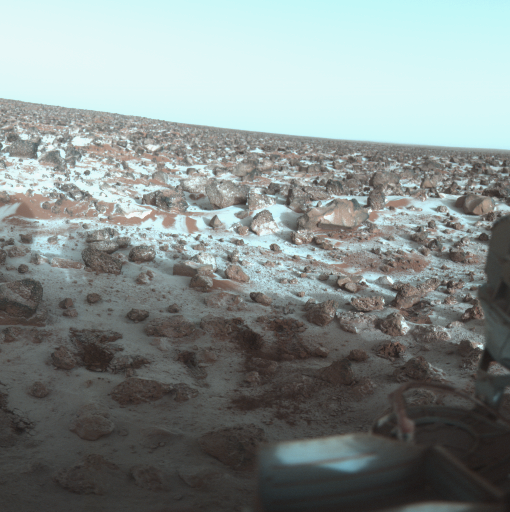
Precipitated water ice covering the Martian plain Utopia Planitia, the water ice precipitated by adhering to dry ice (observed by the Viking 2 lander)

=== Methane ===
As a volcanic and biogenic species, methane is of interest to geologists and astrobiologists. However, methane is chemically unstable in an oxidizing atmosphere with UV radiation. The lifetime of methane in the Martian atmosphere is about 400 years. The detection of methane in a planetary atmosphere may indicate the presence of recent geological activities or living organisms. Since 2004, trace amounts of methane (range from 60 ppb to under detection limit (< 0.05 ppb)) have been reported in various missions and observational studies. The source of methane on Mars and the explanation for the enormous discrepancy in the observed methane concentrations are still under active debate. In 2024, NASA reported that the only place on Mars where methane has been found is Gale Crater.

See also the section "detection of methane" for more details.

=== Sulfur dioxide ===
Sulfur dioxide (SO_{2}) in the atmosphere would be an indicator of current volcanic activity. It has become especially interesting due to the long-standing controversy of methane on Mars. If volcanoes have been active in recent Martian history, it would be expected to find SO_{2} together with methane in the current Martian atmosphere. No SO_{2} has been detected in the atmosphere, with a sensitivity upper limit set at 0.2 ppb. However, a team led by scientists at NASA Goddard Space Flight Center reported detection of SO_{2} in Rocknest soil samples analyzed by the Curiosity rover in March 2013.

=== Other trace gases ===
Carbon monoxide (CO) is produced by the photolysis of CO_{2} and quickly reacts with the oxidants in the Martian atmosphere to re-form CO_{2}. The estimated mean volume ratio of CO in the Martian atmosphere is 0.0747%.

Noble gases, other than helium and argon, are present at trace levels (neon at 2.5 ppmv, krypton at 0.3 ppmv and xenon at 0.08 ppmv) in the Martian atmosphere. The concentration of helium, neon, krypton and xenon in the Martian atmosphere has been measured by different missions. The isotopic ratios of noble gases reveal information about the early geological activities on Mars and the evolution of its atmosphere.

Molecular hydrogen (H_{2}) is produced by the reaction between odd hydrogen species in the middle atmosphere. It can be delivered to the upper atmosphere by mixing or diffusion, decompose to atomic hydrogen (H) by solar radiation and escape the Martian atmosphere. Photochemical modeling estimated that the mixing ratio of H_{2} in the lower atmosphere is about 15 ±5 ppmv.

== Vertical structure ==
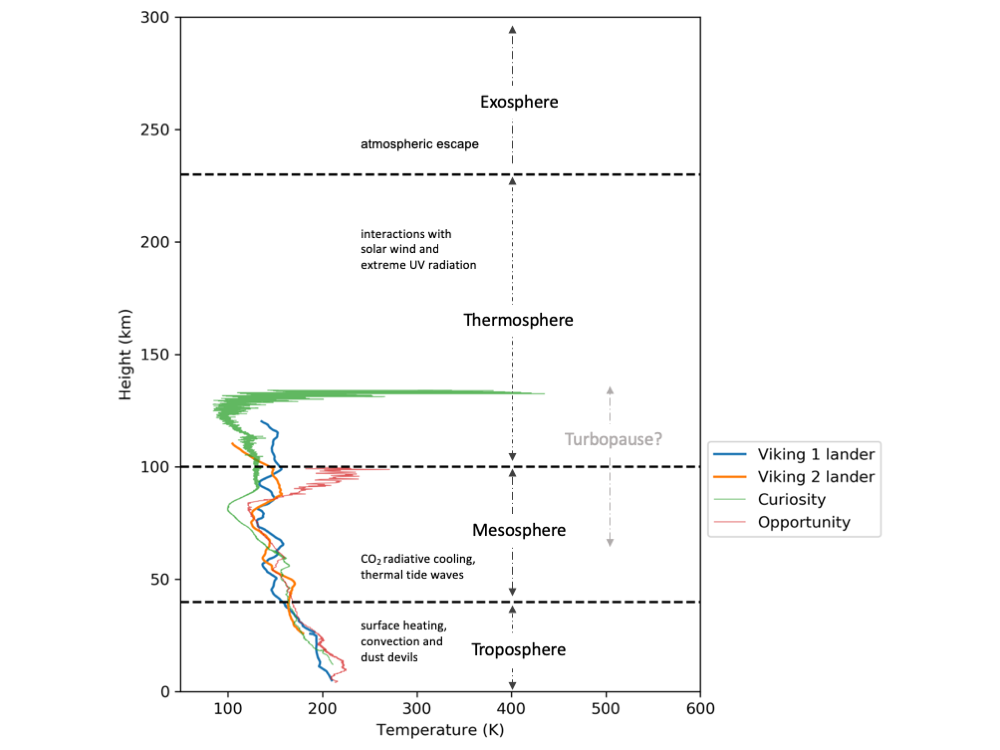
The vertical structure of the atmosphere of Mars overlying with temperature profiles retrieved from the entry probes of Mars landers. Data source: NASA Planetary Data System

The vertical temperature structure of the Martian atmosphere differs from Earth's atmosphere in many ways. Information about the vertical structure is usually inferred by using the observations from thermal infrared soundings, radio occultation, aerobraking, landers' entry profiles. Mars's atmosphere can be classified into three layers according to the average temperature profile:

- Troposphere (≈0–40 km): The layer where most of the weather phenomena (e.g. convection and dust storms) take place. Its dynamics is heavily driven by the daytime surface heating and the amount of suspended dust. Mars has a higher scale height of 11.1 km than Earth (8.5 km) because of its weaker gravity. The theoretical dry adiabatic lapse rate of Mars is 4.3 °C km^{−1}, but the measured average lapse rate is about 2.5 °C km^{−1} because the suspended dust particles absorb solar radiation and heat the air. The planetary boundary layer can extend to over 10 km thick during the daytime. The near-surface diurnal temperature range is huge (60 °C) due to the low thermal inertia. Under dusty conditions, the suspended dust particles can reduce the surface diurnal temperature range to only 5 °C. The temperature above 15 km is controlled by radiative processes instead of convection. Mars is also a rare exception to the "0.1-bar tropopause" rule found in the other atmospheres in our solar system.
- Mesosphere (≈40–100 km): The layer that has the lowest temperature. CO_{2} in the mesosphere acts as a cooling agent by efficiently radiating heat into space. Stellar occultation observations show that the mesopause of Mars locates at about 100 km (around 0.01 to 0.001 Pa level) and has a temperature of 100–120 K. The temperature can sometimes be lower than the frost point of CO_{2}, and detections of CO_{2} ice clouds in the Martian mesosphere have been reported.
- Thermosphere (≈100–230 km): The layer is mainly controlled by extreme UV heating. The temperature of the Martian thermosphere increases with altitude and varies by season. The daytime temperature of the upper thermosphere ranges from 175 K (at aphelion) to 240 K (at perihelion) and can reach up to 390 K, but it is still significantly lower than the temperature of Earth's thermosphere. The higher concentration of CO_{2} in the Martian thermosphere may explain part of the discrepancy because of the cooling effects of CO_{2} in high altitude. It is thought that auroral heating processes is not important in the Martian thermosphere because of the absence of a strong magnetic field in Mars, but the MAVEN orbiter has detected several aurora events.

Mars does not have a persistent stratosphere due to the lack of shortwave-absorbing species in its middle atmosphere (e.g. stratospheric ozone in Earth's atmosphere and organic haze in Jupiter's atmosphere) for creating a temperature inversion. However, a seasonal ozone layer and a strong temperature inversion in the middle atmosphere have been observed over the Martian south pole. The altitude of the turbopause of Mars varies greatly from 60 to 140 km, and the variability is driven by the CO_{2} density in the lower thermosphere. Mars also has a complicated ionosphere that interacts with the solar wind particles, extreme UV radiation and X-rays from Sun, and the magnetic field of its crust. The exosphere of Mars starts at about 230 km and gradually merges with interplanetary space.

The solar wind accelerates ions from Mars's upper atmosphere into space (video (01:13); 5 November 2015)

== Atmospheric dust and other dynamic features ==
=== Atmospheric dust ===
Under sufficiently strong wind (> 30 m/s), dust particles can be mobilized and lifted from the surface to the atmosphere. Some of the dust particles can be suspended in the atmosphere and travel by circulation before falling back to the ground. Dust particles can attenuate solar radiation and interact with infrared radiation, which can lead to a significant radiative effect on Mars. Orbiter measurements suggest that the globally-averaged dust optical depth has a background level of 0.15 and peaks in the perihelion season (southern spring and summer). The local abundance of dust varies greatly by seasons and years. During global dust events, Mars surface assets can observe optical depth that is over 4. Surface measurements also showed the effective radius of dust particles ranges from 0.6 μm to 2 μm and has considerable seasonality.

Dust has an uneven vertical distribution on Mars. Apart from the planetary boundary layer, sounding data showed that there are other peaks of dust mixing ratio at the higher altitude (e.g. 15–30 km above the surface).

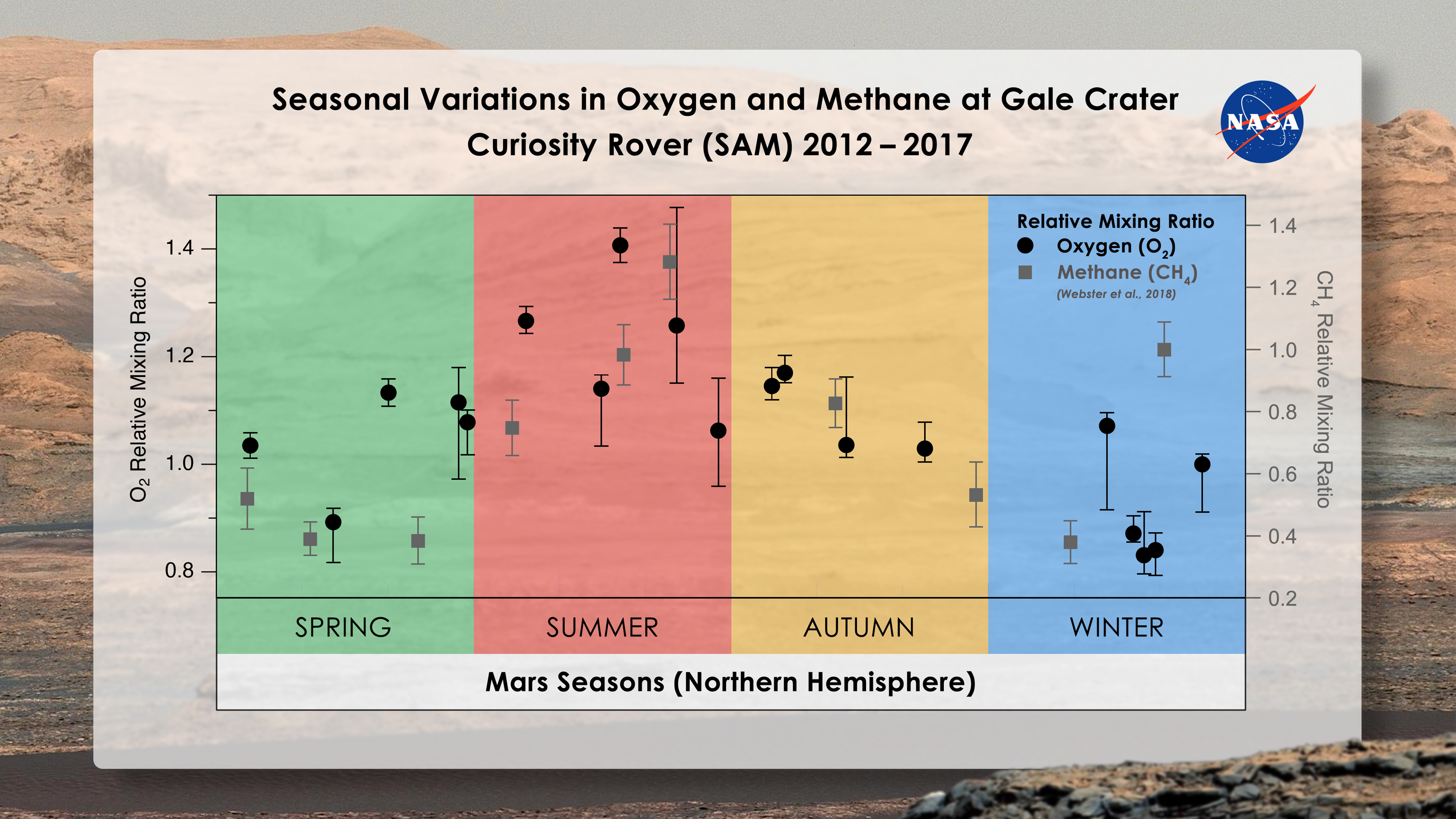
Seasonal variations in oxygen and methane at Gale crater

==== Dust storms ====
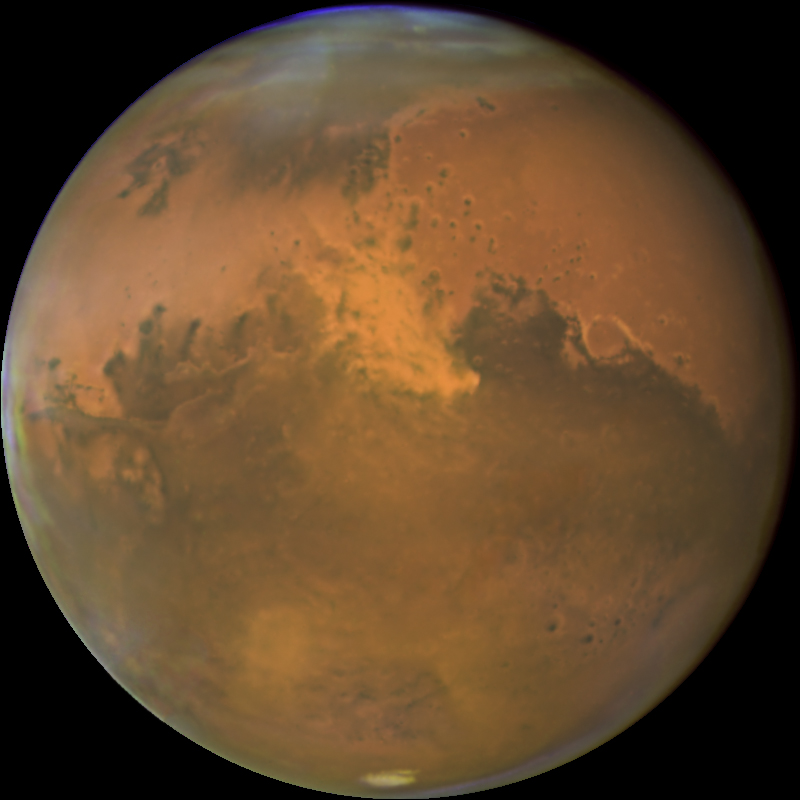
Difference of dust and water clouds: the orange cloud at the center of the image is a large dust cloud, the other white polar clouds are water clouds.

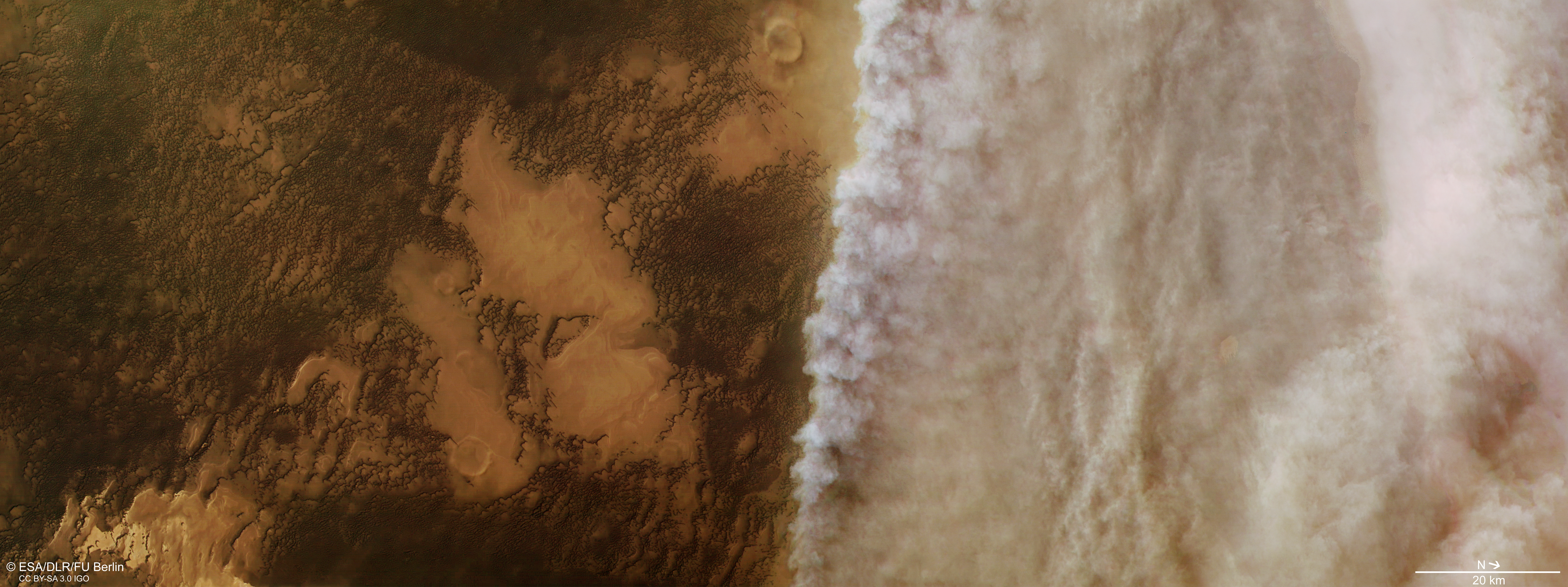
Detail of a Martian dust storm, as viewed from orbit

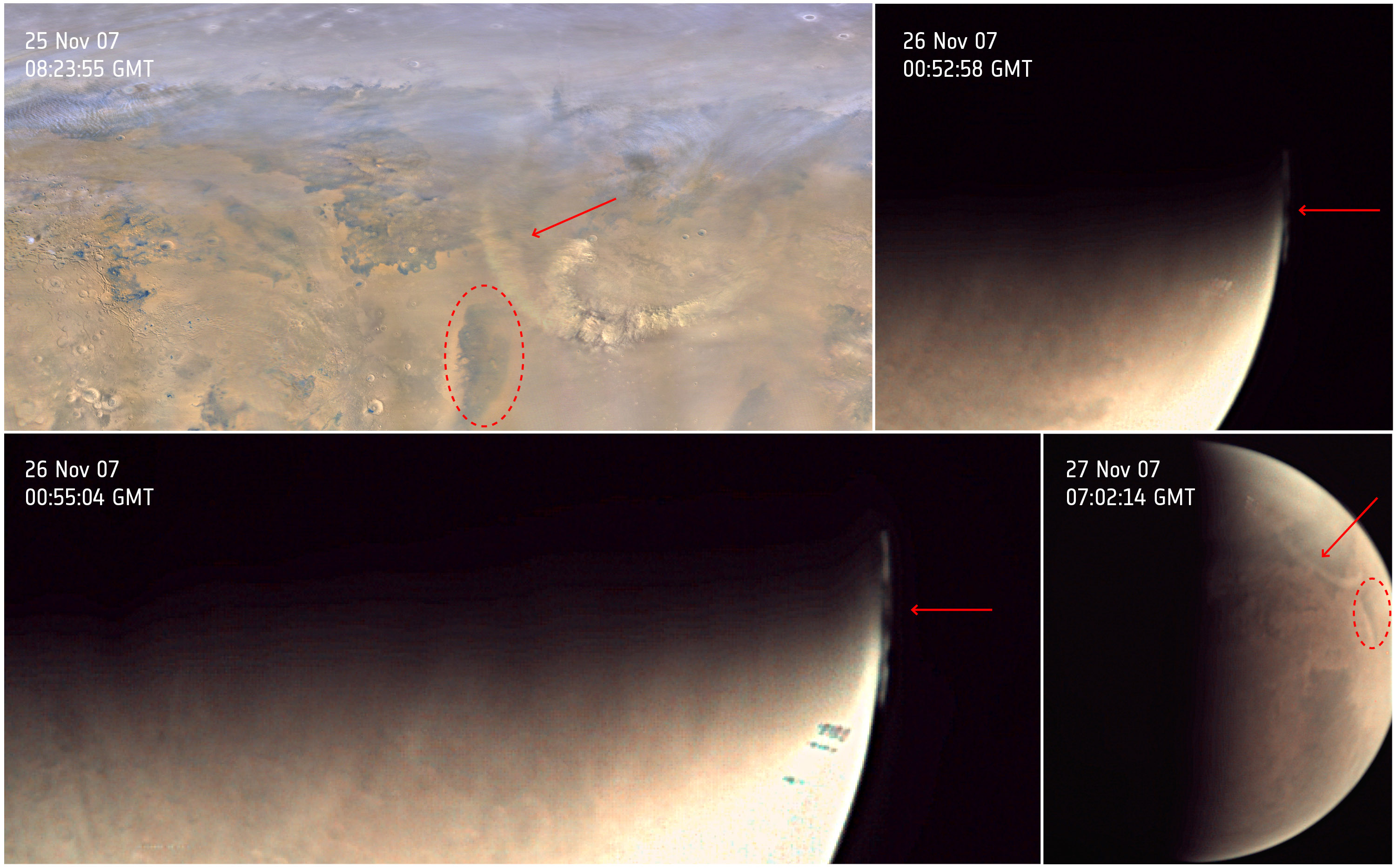
A 700 kilometer long dust storm front (marked by the red arrow) as viewed from orbit at different angles. The red circle of Martian terrain is just for orientation.

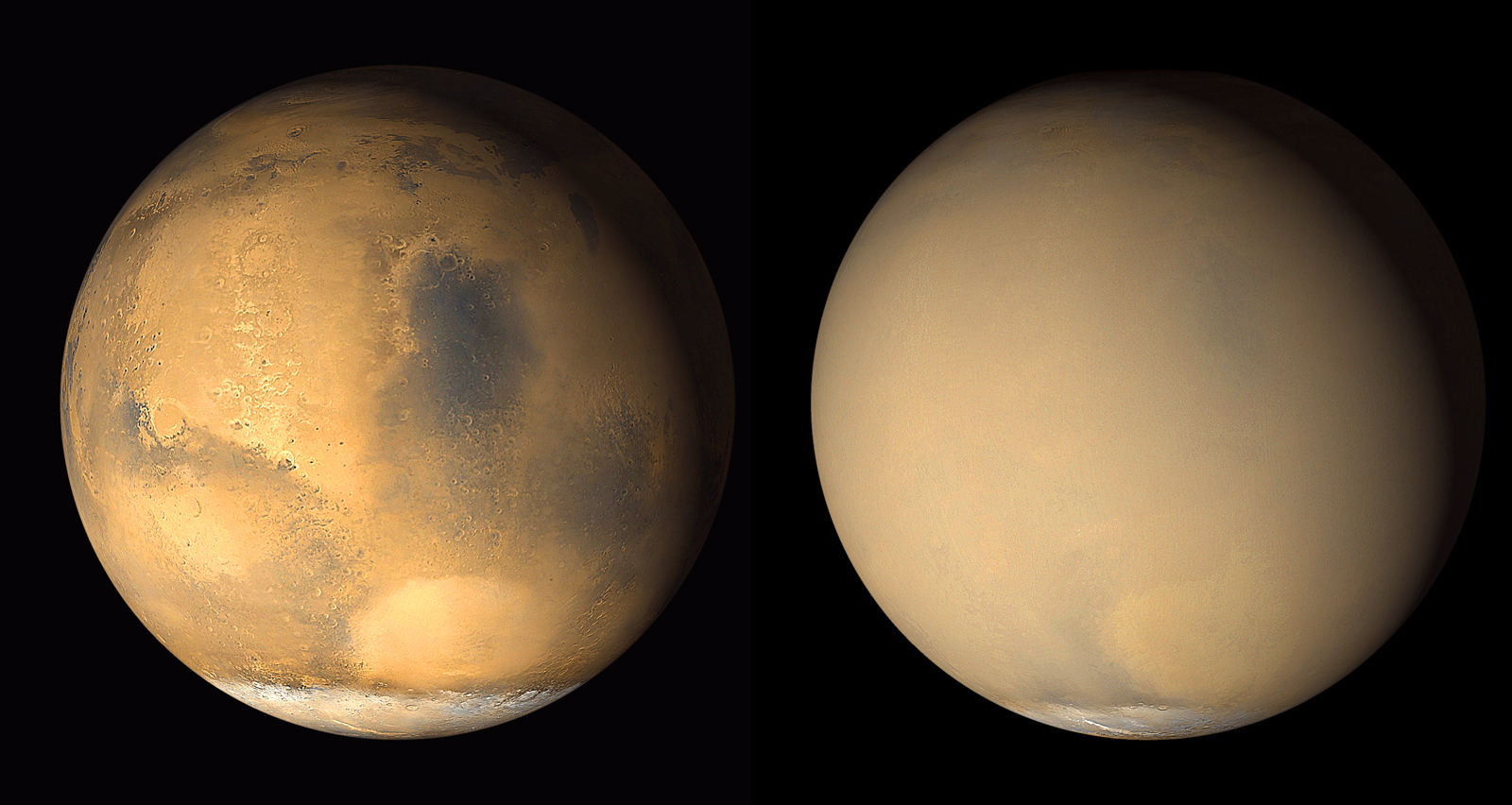
Mars without a dust storm in June 2001 (on left) and with a global dust storm in July 2001 (on right), as seen by Mars Global Surveyor

Local and regional dust storms are not rare on Mars. Local storms have a size of about 10^{3} km^{2} and occurrence of about 2000 events per Martian year, while regional storms of 10^{6} km^{2} large are observed frequently in southern spring and summer. Near the polar cap, dust storms sometimes can be generated by frontal activities and extra-tropical cyclones.

Global dust storms (area > 10^{6} km^{2} ) occur on average once every 3 Martian years. Observations showed that larger dust storms are usually the result of merging smaller dust storms, but the growth mechanism of the storm and the role of atmospheric feedbacks are still not well understood. Although it is thought that Martian dust can be entrained into the atmosphere by processes similar to Earth's (e.g. saltation), the actual mechanisms are yet to be verified, and electrostatic or magnetic forces may also play in modulating dust emission. Researchers reported that the largest single source of dust on Mars comes from the Medusae Fossae Formation.

On 1 June 2018, NASA scientists detected signs of a dust storm (see image) on Mars which resulted in the end of the solar-powered Opportunity rover's mission since the dust blocked the sunlight (see image) needed to operate. By 12 June, the storm was the most extensive recorded at the surface of the planet, and spanned an area about the size of North America and Russia combined (about a quarter of the planet). By 13 June, Opportunity rover began experiencing serious communication problems due to the dust storm.

Mars dust storm – optical depth tau – May to September 2018 (Mars Climate Sounder; Mars Reconnaissance Orbiter) (1:38; animation; 30 October 2018; file description)

==== Dust devils ====
A small dust devil on Mars – viewed by the Curiosity rover – (9 August 2020)

Dust devils are common on Mars. Like their counterparts on Earth, dust devils form when the convective vortices driven by strong surface heating are loaded with dust particles. Dust devils on Mars usually have a diameter of tens of meters and height of several kilometers, which are much taller than the ones observed on Earth. Study of dust devils' tracks showed that most of Martian dust devils occur at around 60°N and 60°S in spring and summer. They lift about 2.3 × 10^{11} kg of dust from land surface to atmosphere annually, which is comparable to the contribution from local and regional dust storms.

==== Wind modification of the surface ====
On Mars, the near-surface wind is not only emitting dust but also modifying the geomorphology of Mars over long time scales. Although it was thought that the atmosphere of Mars is too thin for mobilizing the sandy features, observations made by HiRISE showed that the migration of dunes is not rare on Mars. The global average migration rate of dunes (2 – 120 m tall) is about 0.5 meter per year. Atmospheric circulation models suggested repeated cycles of wind erosion and dust deposition can lead, possibly, to a net transport of soil materials from the lowlands to the uplands on geological timescales.

Movement of sandy features in Nili Patera dune field on Mars detected by HiRISE. Photo credit: NASA/JPL Caltech/U. Arizona/JHU-APL

=== Thermal tides ===
Solar heating on the day side and radiative cooling on the night side of a planet can induce pressure difference. Thermal tides, which are the wind circulation and waves driven by such a daily-varying pressure field, can explain a lot of variability of the Martian atmosphere. Compared to Earth's atmosphere, thermal tides have a larger influence on the Martian atmosphere because of the stronger diurnal temperature contrast. The surface pressure measured by Mars rovers showed clear signals of thermal tides, although the variation also depends on the shape of the planet's surface and the amount of suspended dust in the atmosphere. The atmospheric waves can also travel vertically and affect the temperature and water-ice content in the middle atmosphere of Mars.

=== Orographic clouds ===
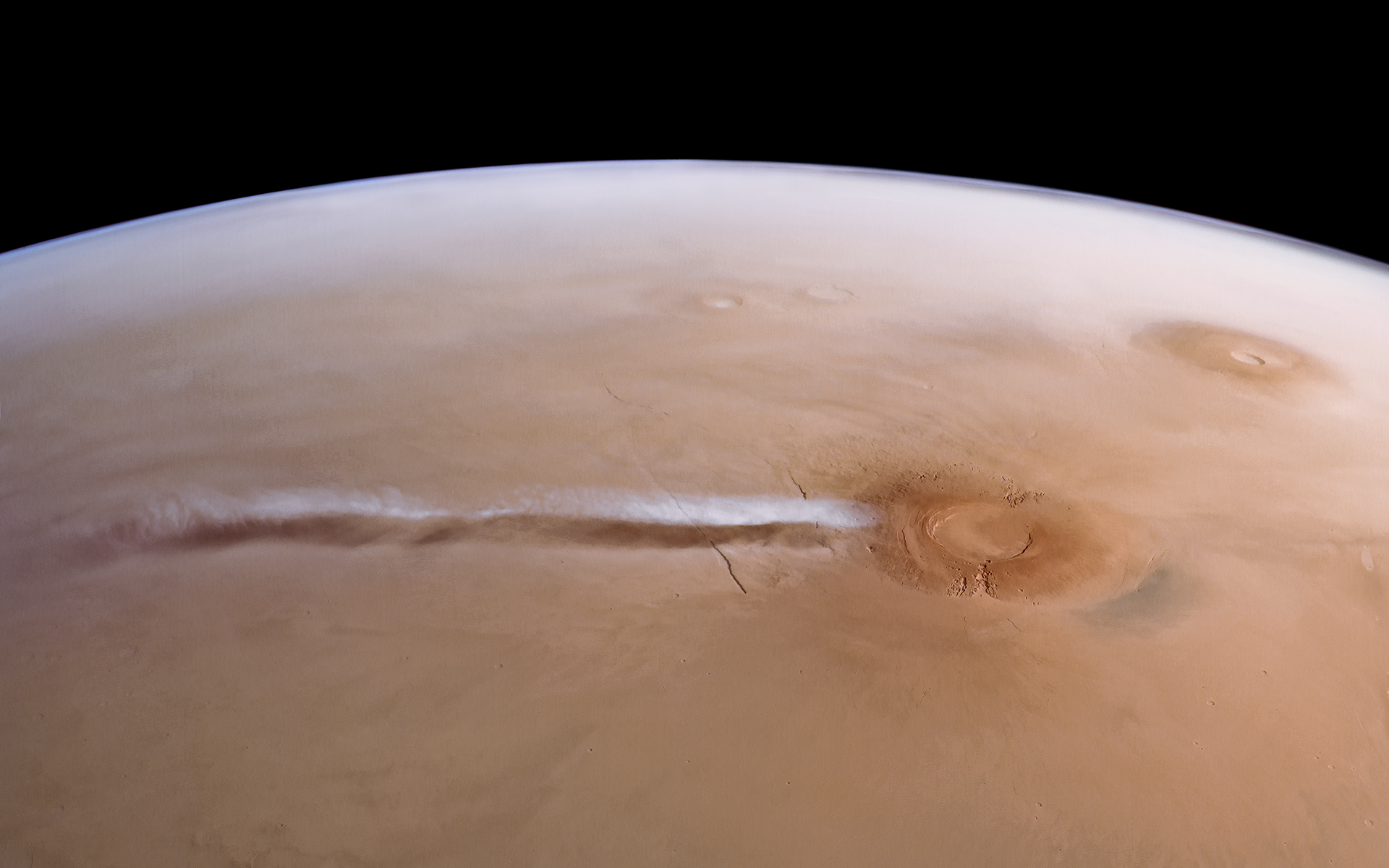
Water-ice clouds formed in the vicinity of the Arsia Mons volcano. The image was taken on 21 September 2018, but similar cloud formation events had been observed in the same site before. Photo credit: ESA/DLR/FU Berlin

On Earth, mountain ranges sometimes force an air mass to rise and cool down. As a result, water vapor becomes saturated and clouds are formed during the lifting process. On Mars, orbiters have observed a seasonally recurrent formation of huge water-ice clouds around the downwind side of the 20 km-high volcanoes Arsia Mons, which is likely caused by the same mechanism.

== Acoustic environment ==
Mars sounds (Perseverance) (video; 1:29; 1 April 2022)

In April 2022, scientists reported, for the first time, studies of sound waves on Mars. These studies were based on measurements by instruments on the Perseverance rover. The scientists found that the speed of sound is slower in the thin Martian atmosphere than on Earth. The speed of sound on Mars, within the audible bandwidth between 20 Hz – 20 kHz, varies depending on pitch, seemingly due to the low pressure and thermal turbulence of Martian surface air; and, as a result of these conditions, sound is much quieter, and live music would be more variable, than on Earth.

== Unexplained phenomena ==
=== Detection of methane ===
Methane (CH_{4}) is chemically unstable in the current oxidizing atmosphere of Mars. It would quickly break down due to ultraviolet radiation from the Sun and chemical reactions with other gases. Therefore, a persistent presence of methane in the atmosphere may imply the existence of a source to continually replenish the gas.

The ESA-Roscosmos Trace Gas Orbiter, which has made the most sensitive measurements of methane in Mars's atmosphere with over 100 global soundings, has found no methane to a detection limit of 0.05 parts per billion (ppb). However, there have been other reports of detection of methane by ground-based telescopes and the Curiosity rover. Trace amounts of methane, at the level of several ppb, were first reported in Mars's atmosphere by a team at the NASA Goddard Space Flight Center in 2003. Large differences in the abundances were measured between observations taken in 2003 and 2006, which suggested that the methane was locally concentrated and probably seasonal.

In 2014, NASA reported that the Curiosity rover detected a tenfold increase ('spike') in methane in the atmosphere around it in late 2013 and early 2014. Four measurements taken over two months in this period averaged 7.2 ppb, implying that Mars is episodically producing or releasing methane from an unknown source. Before and after that, readings averaged around one-tenth that level. On 7 June 2018, NASA announced a cyclical seasonal variation in the background level of atmospheric methane.

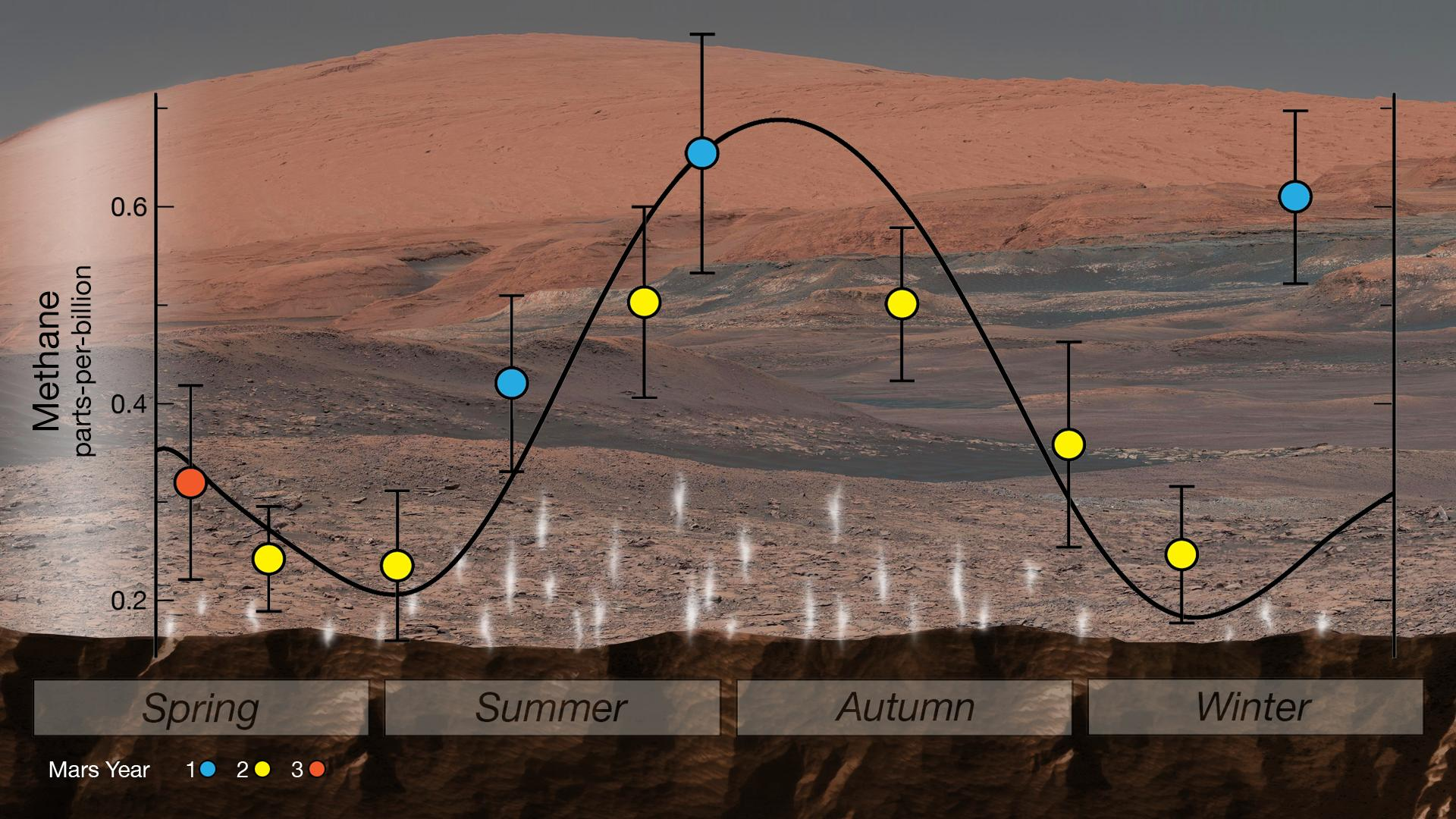
Curiosity detected a cyclical seasonal variation in atmospheric methane.

The principal candidates for the origin of Mars's methane include non-biological processes such as water-rock reactions, radiolysis of water, and pyrite formation, all of which produce H_{2} that could then generate methane and other hydrocarbons via Fischer–Tropsch synthesis with CO and CO_{2}. It has also been shown that methane could be produced by a process involving water, carbon dioxide, and the mineral olivine, which is known to be common on Mars. Living microorganisms, such as methanogens, are another possible source, but no other evidence for the presence of such organisms has been found on Mars. There are some suspicions about the detection of methane, which suggests that it may instead be caused by the undocumented terrestrial contamination from the rovers or a misinterpretation of measurement raw data.

=== Lightning events ===
In 2009, an Earth-based observational study reported detection of large-scale electric discharge events on Mars and proposed that they are related to lightning discharge in Martian dust storms. However, later observation studies showed that the result is not reproducible using the radar receiver on Mars Express and the Earth-based Allen Telescope Array. A laboratory study showed that the air pressure on Mars is not favorable for charging the dust grains, and thus it is difficult to generate lightning in Martian atmosphere. In 2025, The Mars 2020 rover Perseverance recorded putative audio recordings of lightning associated with dust devils and dust storms.

=== Super-rotating jet over the equator ===
Super-rotation refers to the phenomenon that atmospheric mass has a higher angular velocity than the surface of the planet at the equator, which in principle cannot be driven by inviscid axisymmetric circulations. Assimilated data and general circulation model (GCM) simulation suggest that super-rotating jet can be found in Martian atmosphere during global dust storms, but it is much weaker than the ones observed on slow-rotating planets like Venus and Titan. GCM experiments showed that the thermal tides can play a role in inducing the super-rotating jet. Nevertheless, modeling super-rotation still remains as a challenging topic for planetary scientists.

== History of atmospheric observations ==
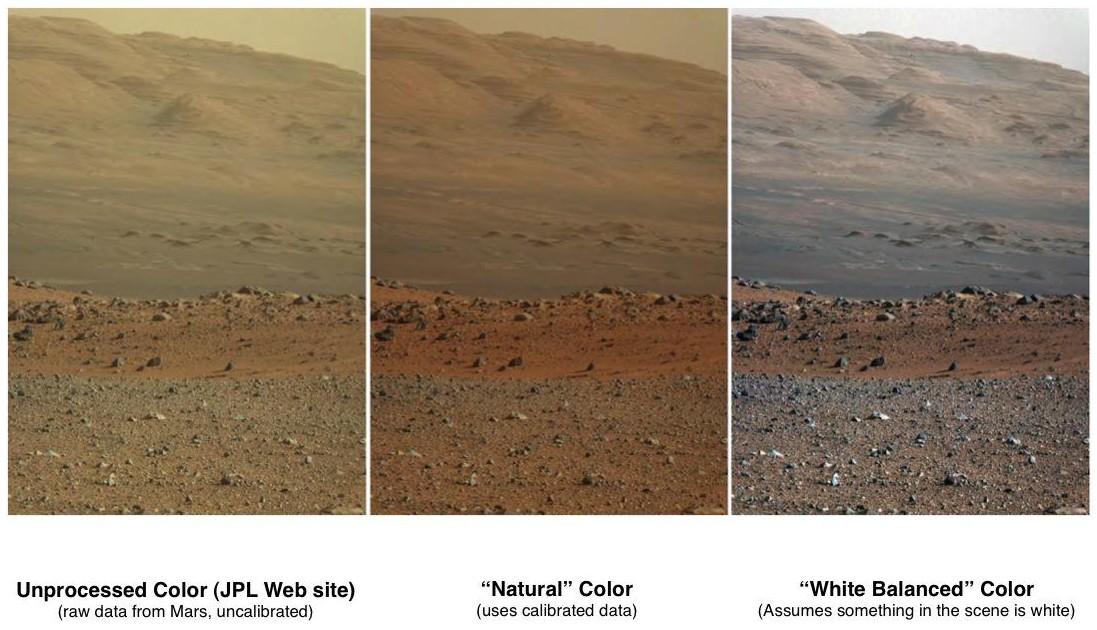
Comparison of color versions (raw, natural, white balance) of Mount Sharp (Aeolis Mons), illustrating the color of and lighting conditions on Mars and its atmosphere.

In 1784, German-born British astronomer William Herschel published an article about his observations of the Martian atmosphere in Philosophical Transactions of the Royal Society and noted the occasional movement of a brighter region on Mars, which he attributed to clouds and vapors. In 1809, French astronomer Honoré Flaugergues wrote about his observation of "yellow clouds" on Mars, which are likely to be dust storm events. In 1864, William Rutter Dawes observed that "the ruddy tint of the planet does not arise from any peculiarity of its atmosphere; it seems to be fully proved by the fact that the redness is always deepest near the centre, where the atmosphere is thinnest." Spectroscopic observations in the 1860s and 1870s led many to think the atmosphere of Mars is similar to Earth's. In 1894, though, spectral analysis and other qualitative observations by William Wallace Campbell suggested Mars resembles the Moon, which has no appreciable atmosphere, in many respects. In 1926, photographic observations by William Hammond Wright at the Lick Observatory allowed Donald Howard Menzel to discover quantitative evidence of Mars's atmosphere.

With an enhanced understanding of optical properties of atmospheric gases and advancement in spectrometer technology, scientists started to measure the composition of the Martian atmosphere in the mid-20th century. Lewis David Kaplan and his team detected the signals of water vapor and carbon dioxide in the spectrogram of Mars in 1964, as well as carbon monoxide in 1969. In 1965, the measurements made during Mariner 4's flyby confirmed that the Martian atmosphere is constituted mostly of carbon dioxide, and the surface pressure is about 400 to 700 Pa. After the composition of the Martian atmosphere was known, astrobiological research began on Earth to determine the viability of life on Mars. Containers that simulated environmental conditions on Mars, called "Mars jars", were developed for this purpose.

In 1976, two landers of the Viking program provided the first ever in-situ measurements of the composition of the Martian atmosphere. Another objective of the mission included investigations for evidence of past or present life on Mars (see Viking lander biological experiments). Since then, many orbiters and landers have been sent to Mars to measure different properties of the Martian atmosphere, such as concentration of trace gases and isotopic ratios. In addition, telescopic observations and analysis of Martian meteorites provide independent sources of information to verify the findings. The imageries and measurements made by these spacecraft greatly improve our understanding of the atmospheric processes outside Earth. The rover Curiosity and the lander InSight are still operating on the surface of Mars to carry out experiments and report the local daily weather. The rover Perseverance and helicopter Ingenuity, which formed the Mars 2020 program, landed in February 2021. The rover Rosalind Franklin is scheduled to launch in 2028.

== Potential for use by humans ==
The atmosphere of Mars is a resource of known composition available at any landing site on Mars. It has been proposed that human exploration of Mars could use carbon dioxide (CO_{2}) from the Martian atmosphere to make methane (CH_{4}) and use it as rocket fuel for the return mission. Mission studies that propose using the atmosphere in this way include the Mars Direct proposal of Robert Zubrin and the NASA Design Reference Mission study. Two major chemical pathways for use of the carbon dioxide are the Sabatier reaction, converting atmospheric carbon dioxide along with additional hydrogen (H_{2}) to produce methane (CH_{4}) and oxygen (O_{2}), and electrolysis, using a zirconia solid oxide electrolyte to split the carbon dioxide into oxygen (O_{2}) and carbon monoxide (CO).

In 2021, the NASA rover Perseverance was able to make oxygen on Mars. The process is complex and takes a lot of time to produce a small amount of oxygen. As of 2023, it had produced a total of 122 grams of oxygen and was able to produce 12 grams per hour. Martian air passes through a HEPA filter, is compressed and heated to 800 °C, and is then sent to a nickel-based cathode where the carbon dioxide is decomposed into oxygen ions and CO. A scandia-stabilized zirconia ceramic electrolyte then sorts and passes oxygen ions to the anode, where the oxygen ions recombine into O_{2}.

== Image gallery ==
Martian sky with clouds at sunset, viewed by InSight

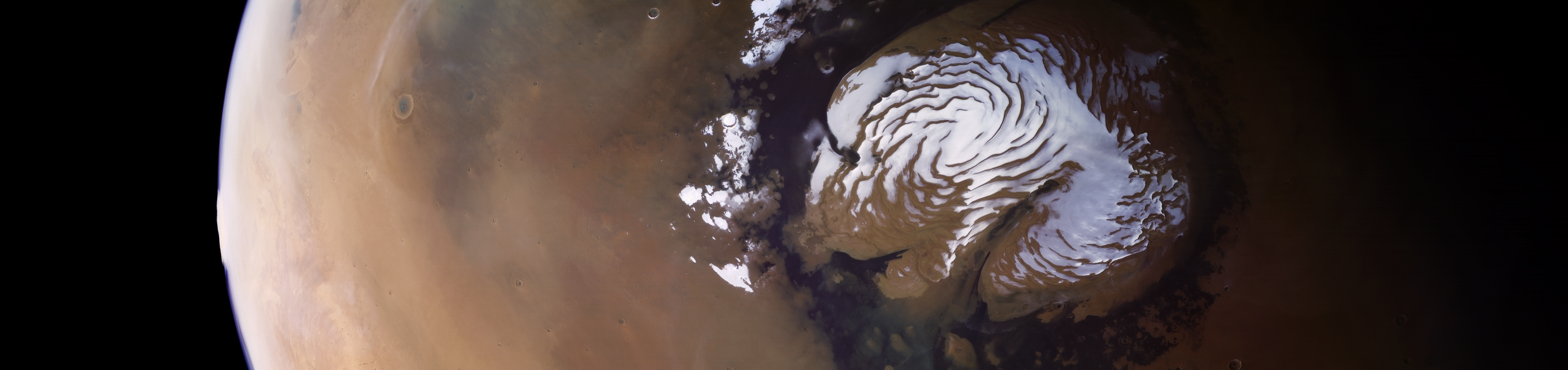
Polar ice cap with the depth of the atmosphere, as well as a large orographic cloud visible at the horizon over Olympus Mons
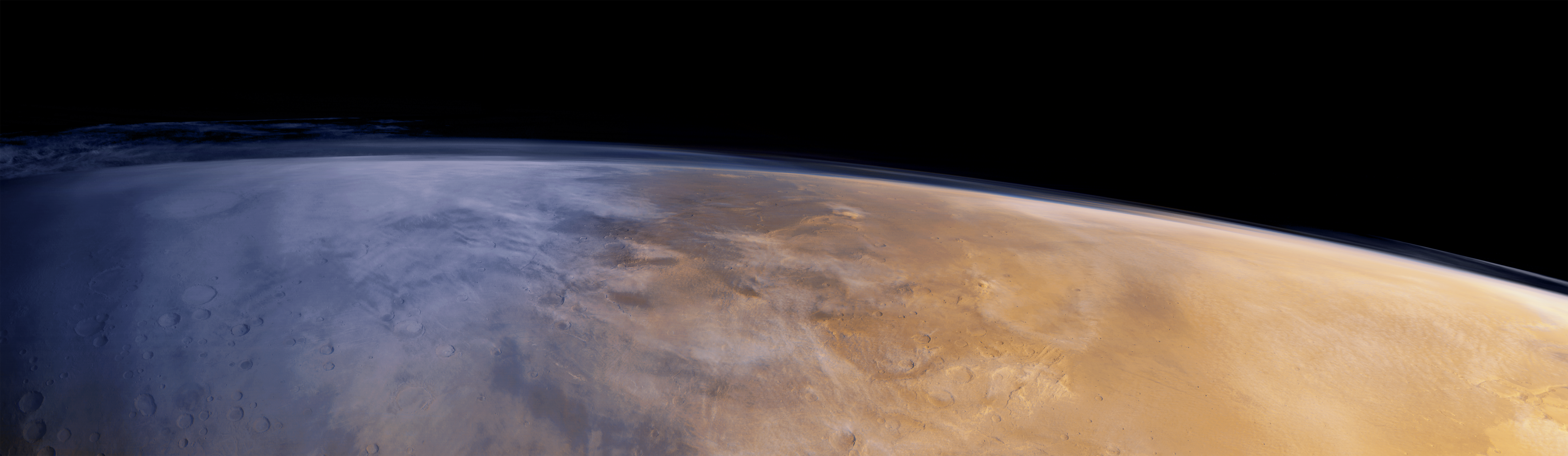
Martian atmosphere with cloud cover over Solis Planum
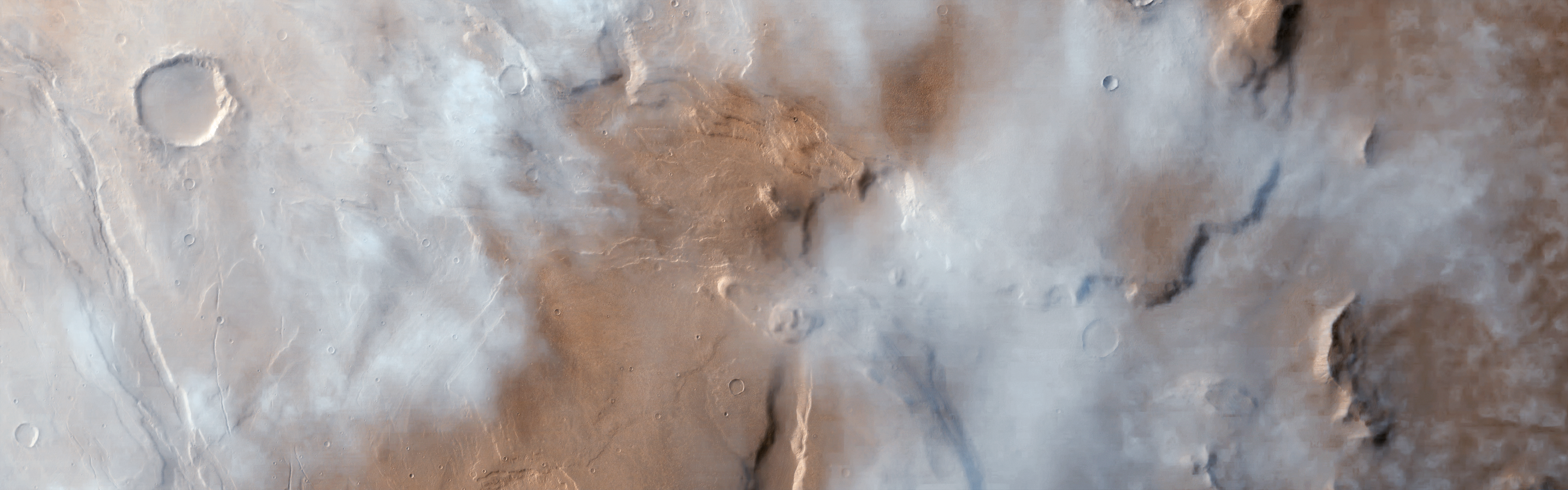
Cloud cover over Tempe Terra
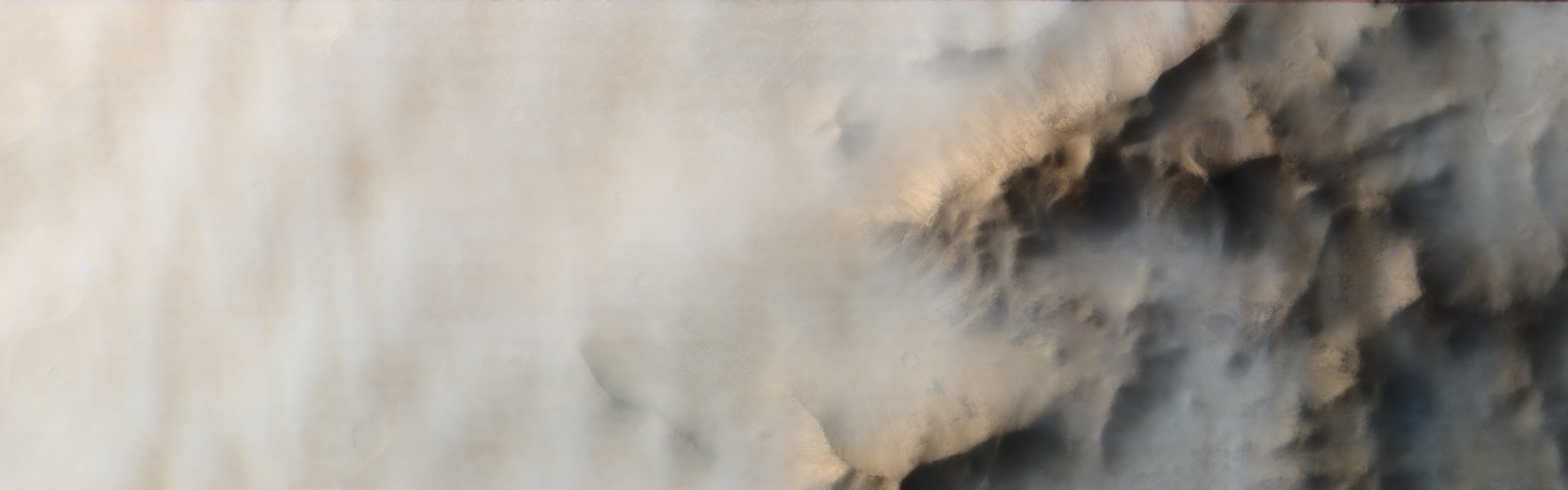
Cloud cover over Charitum Montes
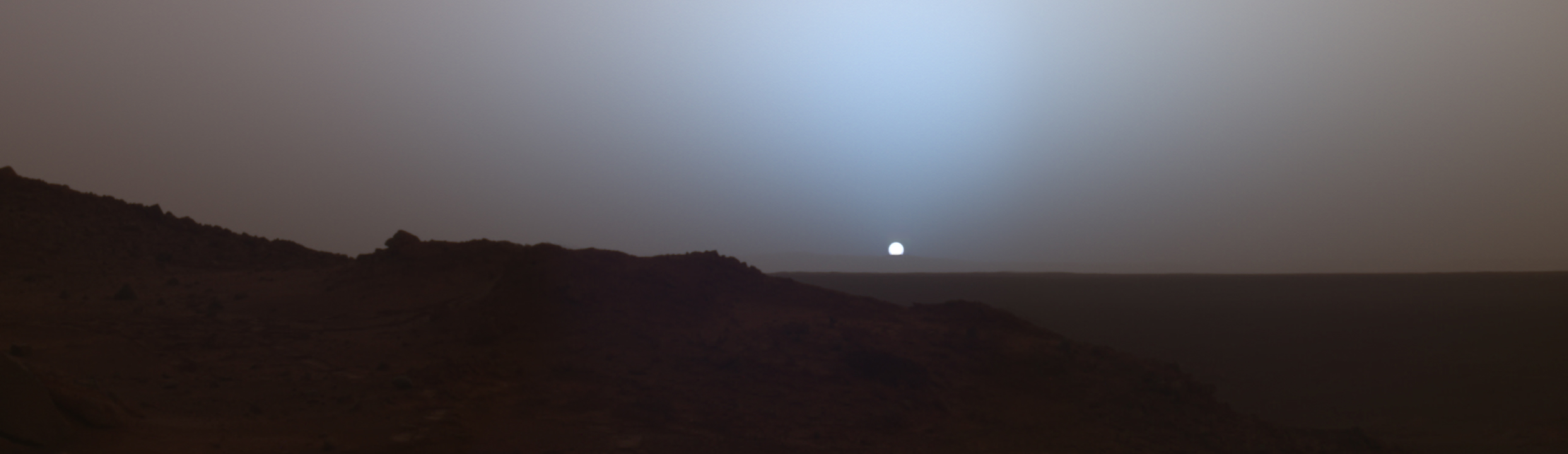
Martian sunset by Spirit rover at Gusev crater (May 2005).
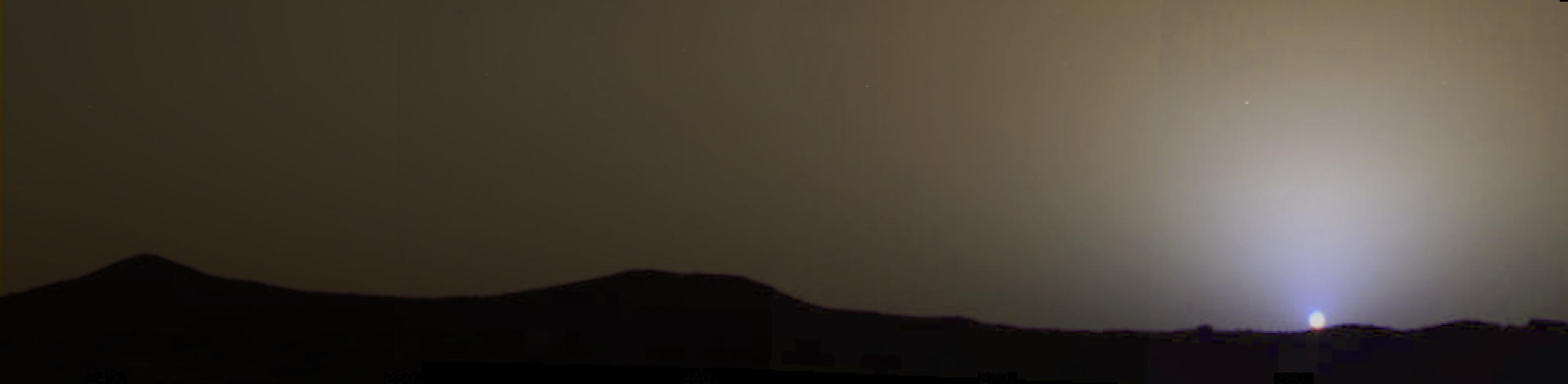
Martian sunset by Pathfinder at Ares Vallis (July 1997).

== See also ==
- Climate of Mars
- In situ resource utilization – Astronautical use of materials harvested in outer space
- Life on Mars – Assessments of possible life on Mars
- Mars MetNet – Cancelled science mission to Mars featuring semi-hard landing strategy
- Mars regional atmospheric modeling system
- MAVEN – NASA Mars orbiter (2013–2025)
- Seasonal flows on warm Martian slopes – Surface features on Mars
- Terraforming of Mars – Hypothetical modification of Mars into an Earth-like habitable planet
- Mars carbonate catastrophe
