= Roger A. Pielke =

American meteorologist (born 1946)

Roger A. Pielke Sr.
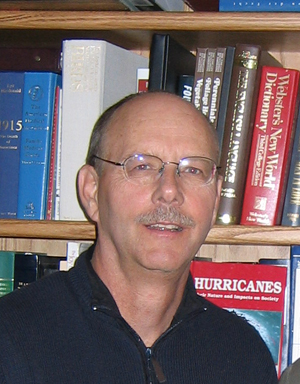
- Born: October 22, 1946 (age 79); United States
- Education: Towson State College (B.A., 1968), Pennsylvania State University (M.S., 1969; Ph.D., 1973)
- Known for: land and sea interactions with atmosphere, atmospheric dynamics, climate change, RAMS
- Awards: Leroy Meisinger Award (1977), Abell New Faculty Research and Graduate Program Award (1984), Abell Research Faculty Award (1987–88)
- Scientific career
- Fields: Meteorology, Climatology, Earth System Science
- Workplaces: University of Colorado Boulder, Colorado State University, Duke University, University of Virginia, NOAA Experimental Meteorology Lab
- Thesis: A three dimensional numerical model of the sea breezes over South Florida : a thesis in Meteorology

Notes
- Son Roger A. Pielke (Jr), political scientist (public policy and science, politicization of science, environment-society interactions)

Roger A. Pielke Sr. (born October 22, 1946) is an American meteorologist with interests in climate variability and climate change, environmental vulnerability, numerical modeling, atmospheric dynamics, land/ocean – atmosphere interactions, and large eddy/turbulent boundary layer modeling. He particularly focuses on mesoscale weather and climate processes but also investigates on the global, regional, and microscale.

== Background ==
Pielke was awarded a B.A. in mathematics at Towson State College in 1968, and then an M.S. and Ph.D. in meteorology at Pennsylvania State University (PSU) in 1969 and 1973, respectively.

From 1971 to 1974 he worked as a research scientist at the NOAA Experimental Meteorology Lab (EML), from 1974 to 1981 he was an associate professor at the University of Virginia (UVa), served the primary academic position of his career as a professor at Colorado State University (CSU) from 1981 to 2006, was deputy of Cooperative Institute for Research in the Atmosphere (CIRA) at Colorado State University from 1985 to 1988, from 1999 to 2006 was Colorado State Climatologist, at Duke University was a research professor from 2003 to 2006, and was a visiting professor at the University of Arizona from October–December 2004. Since 2005, Pielke has served as senior research scientist at the Cooperative Institute for Research in Environmental Sciences (CIRES) at CU-Boulder and an emeritus professor of the Department of Atmospheric Science at CSU. After retiring from CSU and he remains a CIRES emeritus researcher.

Pielke spearheaded development of the Regional Atmospheric Modeling System (RAMS) with William R. Cotton.

Pielke has served as Chairman and Member of the American Meteorological Society Committee on Weather Forecasting and Analysis, as Chief Editor of Monthly Weather Review, was elected a Fellow of the American Meteorological Society (AMS) in 1982 and a Fellow of the American Geophysical Union (AGU) in 2004, has served as Editor-in-Chief of the U.S. National Science Report to the International Union of Geodesy and Geophysics, as Co-Chief Editor of the Journal of the Atmospheric Sciences, and as Editor of Scientific Online Letters on the Atmosphere.

== On climate change ==
Although he had stated that carbon dioxide is not the predominant forcing of global warming, Pielke said in 2007 that he was not a "sceptical scientist" about climate change:

As I have summarized on the Climate Science weblog, humans activities do significantly alter the heat content of the climate system, although, based on the latest understanding, the radiative effect of CO_{2} has contributed, at most, only about 28% to the human-caused warming up to the present. The other 72% is still a result of human activities!

Pielke has criticized the IPCC, claiming they are over-simplifying the science involved, not properly communicating uncertainties in models, and being too focussed on CO_{2} while neglecting other climate forcing effects.

In 2010 Pielke revisited a question provided by Andrew Revkin "Is most of the observed warming over the last 50 years likely to have been due to the increase in greenhouse gas concentrations", Pielke stated that "the 2010 answer ... remains NO", and that "The added greenhouse gases from human activity clearly have a role in increasing the heat content of the climate system from what it otherwise would be", but "there are other equally or even more important significant human climate forcings" and furthermore "We now know, however, that the natural variations of atmospheric and ocean circulation features within the climate system produces global average heat changes that are substantially larger than what was known in 2005. The IPCC models have failed to adequately simulate this effect."

== Family ==
Pielke is married. He has two children. His son Roger A. Pielke Jr. is a political scientist and works in the field of climate policy.

== Publications ==
Pielke has published more than 300 scientific papers, 50 chapters in books, and co-edited 9 books. A listing of papers can be viewed at the Pielke Research Group website.

- Pielke, R.A., 1984: Mesoscale Meteorological Modeling. 1st Edition, Academic Press, New York.
- Pielke, R.A., 1990: The Hurricane. Routledge Press, London.
- Cotton, W.R. and R.A. Pielke, 1995: Human impacts on weather and climate, Cambridge University Press, New York.
- Pielke, R.A., 1995: A primer on weather and climate.
- Pielke, R.A. and R.P. Pearce, Editors, 1994: Mesoscale modeling of the atmosphere. American Meteorological Society Monograph, Volume 25.
- Pielke, R.A. Jr. and R.A. Pielke Sr., 1997: Hurricanes: Their nature and impacts on society. John Wiley and Sons, England.
- Pielke, R.A. Jr. and R.A. Pielke Sr., Editors, 2000: Storms, Volumes I and II, Routledge Press, London.
- Pielke, R.A Sr.., 2002: Mesoscale meteorological modeling. 2nd Edition, Academic Press, San Diego, California.
- Kabat, P., Claussen, M., Dirmeyer, P.A., J.H.C. Gash, L. Bravo de Guenni, M. Meybeck, R.A. Pielke Sr., C.J. Vorosmarty, R.W.A. Hutjes, and S. Lutkemeier, Editors, 2002: Vegetation, water, humans and the climate: A new perspective on an interactive system. Global Change – The IGBP Series Springer
