= Free-return trajectory =

Return of a spacecraft under gravity

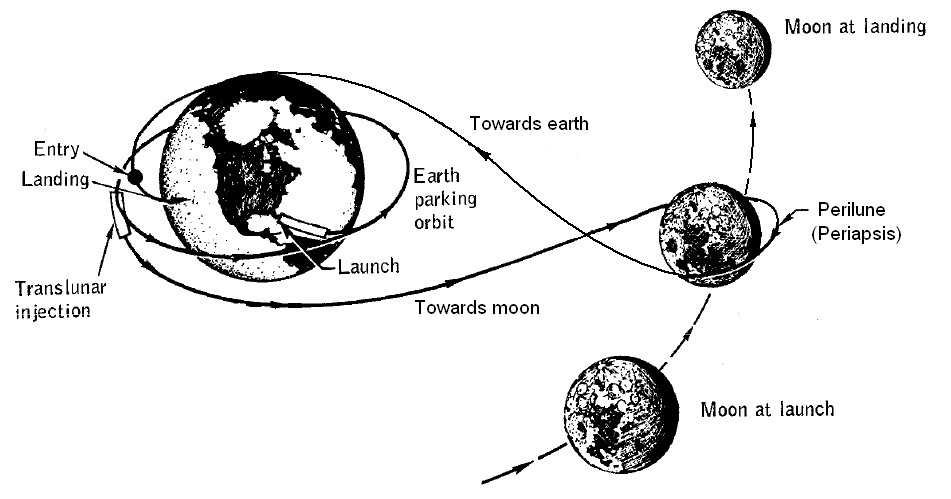
Sketch of a circumlunar free-return trajectory (not to scale), plotted on the rotating reference frame rotating with the Moon (Moon's motion only shown for clarity)

In orbital mechanics, a free-return trajectory is a trajectory of a spacecraft traveling away from a primary body (for example, the Earth) where gravity due to a secondary body (for example, the Moon) causes the spacecraft to return to the primary body without propulsion (hence the term free).

Many free-return trajectories are designed to intersect the atmosphere; however, periodic versions exist which pass the Moon and Earth at constant periapsis, which have been proposed for cyclers.

== Earth–Moon ==
The first spacecraft to use a free-return trajectory was the Soviet Luna 3 mission in October 1959. It used the Moon's gravity to send it back towards the Earth so that the photographs it had taken of the far side of the Moon could be downloaded by radio.

Symmetrical free-return trajectories were studied by Arthur Schwaniger of NASA in 1963 with reference to the Earth–Moon system. He studied cases in which the trajectory at some point crosses at a right angle to the line going through the center of the Earth and the center of the Moon, and also cases in which the trajectory crosses at right angles to the plane of the Moon's orbit. To distinguish between them:

Free-return trajectories from the Earth to the Moon, not to scale, viewed from the north in inertial coordinates. The Moon is shown where it is at the moment of closest approach by the spacecraft. (Note: These trajectories are shown in an inertial reference frame with the Earth stationary. In the Moon's reference frame, trajectory Bi appears similar to the mirror image of trajectory Bii. In Bi, the spaceship doesn't go around the Moon.)

- A circumlunar free-return trajectory around the Moon. The spacecraft passes behind the Moon. It moves there in a direction opposite to that of the Moon, or at least slower than the Moon in the same direction. If the craft's orbit begins in a normal (west to east) direction near Earth, then it makes a sort of figure 8 around the Earth and Moon when plotted in a coordinate system that rotates as the Moon goes around the Earth. (But the "figure 8" does not quite finish, coming back to Earth at a different position from where it departed.)
- A cislunar free-return trajectory. The spacecraft goes beyond the orbit of the Moon, returns to inside the Moon's orbit, moves in front of the Moon while being diverted by the Moon's gravity to a path away from the Earth to beyond the orbit of the Moon again, and is drawn back to Earth by Earth's gravity. (There is no real distinction between these trajectories and similar ones that never go beyond the Moon's orbit, but the latter may not get very close to the Moon, so are not considered as relevant.)

In both the circumlunar case and the cislunar case, the craft can be moving generally from west to east around the Earth (co-rotational), or from east to west (counter-rotational).

For trajectories in the plane of the Moon's orbit with small periselenum radius (close approach of the Moon), the flight time for a cislunar free-return trajectory is longer than for the circumlunar free-return trajectory with the same periselenum radius. Flight time for a cislunar free-return trajectory decreases with increasing periselenum radius, while flight time for a circumlunar free-return trajectory increases with periselenum radius.

The speed at a perigee of 6555 km from the centre of the Earth for trajectories passing between 2000 and 20 000 km from the Moon is between 10.84 and 10.92 km/s regardless of whether the trajectory is cislunar or circumlunar or whether it is co-rotational or counter-rotational.

Using the simplified model where the orbit of the Moon around the Earth is circular, Schwaniger found that there exists a free-return trajectory in the plane of the orbit of the Moon which is periodic. After returning to low altitude above the Earth (the perigee radius is a parameter, typically 6555 km) the spacecraft would start over on the same trajectory. This periodic trajectory is counter-rotational (it goes from east to west when near the Earth). It has a period of about 650 hours (compare with a sidereal month, which is 655.7 hours, or 27.3 days). Considering the trajectory in an inertial (non-rotating) frame of reference, the perigee occurs directly under the Moon when the Moon is on one side of the Earth. Speed at perigee is about 10.91 km/s. After three days it reaches the Moon's orbit, but now more or less on the opposite side of the Earth from the Moon. After a few more days, the craft reaches its (first) apogee and begins to fall back toward the Earth, but as it approaches the Moon's orbit, the Moon arrives, and there is a gravitational interaction. The craft passes on the near side of the Moon at a radius of 2150 km (410 km above the surface) and is thrown back outwards, where it reaches a second apogee. It then falls back toward the Earth, goes around to the other side, and goes through another perigee close (still in the non-rotating frame of reference) to where the first perigee had taken place. By this time the Moon has moved almost half an orbit and is again directly over the craft at perigee. Other cislunar trajectories are similar but do not end up in the same situation as at the beginning, so cannot repeat.

There will of be similar trajectories with periods of about two sidereal months, three sidereal months, and so on. In each case, the two apogees will be further and further away from Earth. These were not considered by Schwaniger.

This kind of trajectory can occur for similar three-body problems. The problem is an example of a circular restricted three-body problem.

While in a true free-return trajectory no propulsion is applied, in practice there may be small mid-course corrections or other maneuvers.

A free-return trajectory may be the initial trajectory to allow a safe return in the event of a systems failure; this was applied in the Apollo 8, Apollo 10, and Apollo 11 lunar missions. In such a case a free return to a suitable reentry situation is more useful than returning to near the Earth, but then needing propulsion anyway to prevent moving away from it again. Since all went well, these Apollo missions did not have to take advantage of the free return and inserted into orbit upon arrival at the Moon. The atmospheric entry interface velocity upon return from the Moon is approximately 36,500 ft/s (11.1 km/s; 40,100 km/h; 24,900 mph) whereas the more common spacecraft return velocity from low Earth orbit (LEO) is approximately 7.8 km/s (28,000 km/h; 17,000 mph).

Due to the lunar landing site restrictions that resulted from constraining the launch to a free return that flew by the Moon, subsequent Apollo missions, starting with Apollo 12 and including the ill-fated Apollo 13, used a hybrid trajectory that launched to a highly elliptical Earth orbit that fell short of the Moon with effectively a free return to the atmospheric entry corridor. They then performed a mid-course maneuver to change to a trans-Lunar trajectory that was not a free return. This retained the safety characteristics of being on a free return upon launch and only departed from free return once the systems were checked out and the Lunar Module was docked with the command module, providing back-up maneuver capabilities. Within hours after the accident, Apollo 13 used the Lunar Module to maneuver from its planned trajectory to a circumlunar free-return trajectory. Apollo 13 was the only Apollo mission to actually turn around the Moon in a free-return trajectory (however, two hours after perilune, propulsion was applied to speed the return to Earth by 10 hours and move the landing spot from the Indian Ocean to the Pacific Ocean).

Artemis II in 2026 also used a free-return trajectory around the Moon.

== Earth–Mars ==
A free-return transfer orbit to Mars is also possible. As with the Moon, this option is mostly considered for crewed missions. Robert Zubrin, in his book The Case for Mars, discusses various trajectories to Mars for his mission design Mars Direct. The Hohmann transfer orbit can be made free-return. It takes 250 days (0.68 years) in the transit to Mars, and in the case of a free-return style abort without the use of propulsion at Mars, 1.5 years to get back to Earth, at a total delta-v requirement of 3.34 km/s. Zubrin advocates a slightly faster transfer, that takes only 180 days to Mars, but 2 years back to Earth in case of an abort. This route comes also at the cost of a higher delta-v of 5.08 km/s. Zubrin writes that faster routes have a significantly higher delta-v cost and free-return duration (e.g. transfer to Mars in 130 days takes 7.93 km/s delta-v and 4 years on the free return), and so he advocates for the 180-day transfer. A free return is also the part of various other mission designs, such as Mars Semi-Direct and Inspiration Mars.

There also exists the option of two- or three-year free-returns that do not rely on the gravity of Mars, but are simply transfer orbits with periods of 2 or 1.5 years, respectively. A two-year free return means from Earth to Mars (aborted there) and then back to Earth all in 2 years. The entry corridor (range of permissible path angles) for landing on Mars is limited, and experience has shown that the path angle is hard to fix (e.g. ±0.5°). This limits entry into the atmosphere to less than 9 km/s. On this assumption, a two-year return is not possible for some years, and for some years a delta-v kick of 0.6 to 2.7 km/s at Mars may be needed to get back to Earth.

NASA published the Design Reference Architecture 5.0 for Mars in 2009, advocating a 174-day transfer to Mars, which is close to Zubrin's proposed trajectory. It cites a delta-v requirement of approximately 4 km/s for the trans-Mars injection, but does not mention the duration of a free return to Earth.

== See also ==
- Gravity turn in orbital redirection
- Patched conic approximation
- Distant retrograde orbit
