= Mars to Stay =

Mars colonization architecture proposing no return vehicles

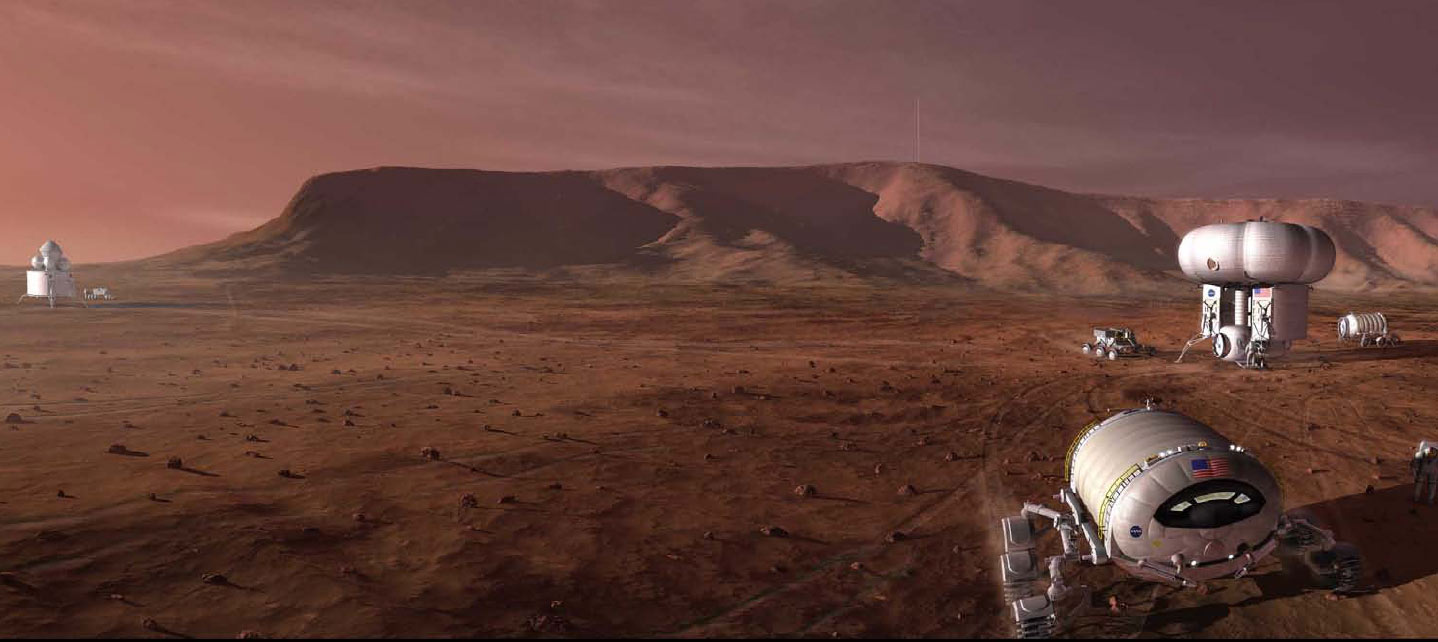
Concept for NASA Design Reference Mission Architecture 5.0 (2009)

Mars to Stay missions propose that astronauts sent to Mars for the first time should intend to remain there. Unused emergency return vehicles would be recycled into settlement construction as soon as the habitability of Mars becomes evident to the initial pioneers. Mars to Stay missions are advocated both to reduce cost and to ensure permanent settlement of Mars. Among many notable Mars to Stay advocates, former Apollo astronaut Buzz Aldrin has been particularly outspoken, suggesting in numerous forums "Forget the Moon, Let’s Head to Mars!" and, in June 2013, Aldrin promoted a crewed mission "to homestead Mars and become a two-planet species". In August 2015, Aldrin, in association with the Florida Institute of Technology, presented a "master plan", for NASA consideration, for astronauts, with a "tour of duty of ten years", to colonize Mars before the year 2040. The Mars Underground, Mars Homestead Project / Mars Foundation, Mars One (defunct in 2019), and Mars Artists Community advocacy groups and business organizations have also adopted Mars to Stay policy initiatives.

The earliest formal outline of a Mars to Stay mission architecture was given at the Case for Mars VI Workshop in 1996, during a presentation by George Herbert titled "One Way to Mars".

== Proposals ==
=== Arguments for settlement missions ===
Since returning the astronauts from the surface of Mars is one of the most difficult parts of a Mars mission, the idea of a one-way trip to Mars has been proposed several times. Space activist Bruce Mackenzie, for example, proposed a one-way trip to Mars in a presentation "One Way to Mars – a Permanent Settlement on the First Mission" at the 1998 International Space Development Conference, arguing that since the mission could be done with less difficulty and expense if the astronauts were not required to return to Earth, the first mission to Mars should be a settlement, not a visit.

Paul Davies, writing in The New York Times in 2004, made similar arguments. Under Davies' plan, an initial colony of four astronauts equipped with a small nuclear reactor and a couple of rover vehicles would make their own oxygen, grow food, and even initiate building projects using local raw materials. Supplemented by food shipments, medical supplies, and replacement gadgets from Earth, the colony would be indefinitely sustained.

=== Original Aldrin plan ===
Under Mars to Stay mission architectures, the first humans to travel to Mars would typically be in six-member teams. After this initial landing, subsequent missions would raise the number of persons on Mars to 30, thereby beginning a Martian settlement. Since the Martian surface offers some of the natural resources and elements necessary to sustain a robust, mature, industrialized human settlement—unlike, for example the Moon—a permanent Martian settlement is thought to be the most effective way to ensure that humanity becomes a space-faring, multi-planet species.

A Mars to Stay mission following Aldrin's proposal would enlist astronauts in the following timeline:

- Age 30: an offer to help settle Mars is extended to select pioneers
- Age 30–35: training and social conditioning for long-duration isolation and time-delay communications
- Age 35–65: development of sheltered underground living spaces
- Age 65: an offer to return to Earth or retire on Mars is given to first-generation settlers

As Aldrin has said, "who knows what advances will have taken place. The first generation can retire there, or maybe we can bring them back."

=== "To Boldly Go: A One-Way Human Mission to Mars" ===
An article by Dirk Schulze-Makuch (Washington State University) and Paul Davies (Arizona State University) from the 2010 article The Human Mission to Mars: Colonizing the Red Planet highlights their mission plans as:

- No base on the Moon is needed. Given the broad variety of resources available on Mars, the long-term survival of Martian settlers is much more feasible than Lunar settlers.
- Since Mars affords neither an ozone shield nor magnetospheric protection, robots would prepare a basic modular base inside near-surface lava tubes and ice caves for the human settlers.
- A volunteer signing up for a one-way mission to Mars would do so with the full understanding that they will not return to Earth; Mars exploration would proceed for a long time on the basis of outbound journeys only.
- The first human contingent would consist of a crew of four, ideally (if budget permits) distributed between two two-man spacecraft for mission redundancy.
- Over time humans on Mars will increase with follow-up missions. Several subsurface biospheres would be created until there were 150+ individuals in a viable gene pool. Genetic engineering would further contribute to the health and longevity of settlers.

The astronauts would be sent supplies from Earth regularly. This proposal was picked up for discussion in a number of public sources.

=== Mars One ===
A proposal for a one-way human settlement mission to Mars was put forward in 2012 by the Mars One, a private spaceflight project led by Dutch entrepreneur Bas Lansdorp to establish a permanent human colony on Mars. Mars One was a Dutch not-for-profit foundation, a Stichting. The proposal was to send a communication satellite and pathfinder lander to the planet by 2018 and, after several stages, land four humans on Mars for permanent settlement in 2027. A new set of four astronauts would then arrive every two years. 200,000 applications were started; about 2,500 were complete enough for consideration, from which one hundred applicants were chosen. Further selections were planned to narrow this down to six groups of four before training began in 2016. It was hoped that a reality television show, participant fees, and donations would generate the funding for the project.

The project was criticized by experts as a 'scam' and as 'delusional'. On January 15, 2019, a court decision was settled to liquidate the organization, sending it into bankruptcy administration.

=== Strive to Stay: Emergency Return Only ===
In response to feedback following the EarthLight Institute's "Mars Colony 2030" project at NewSpace 2012 and the announcement of Mars One, Eric Machmer proposed conjunction-class missions be planned with a bias to stay (if low gravity, radiation, and other factors present no pressing health issues), so that, if at the end of each 550-day period during a conjunction-class launch window no adverse health effects were observed, settlers would continue research and construction through another 550-day period. In the meantime, additional crews and supplies would continue to arrive, starting their own 550-day evaluation periods. Health tests would be repeated during subsequent 550-day periods until the viability of human life on Mars was proven. Once settlers determine that humans can live on Mars without negative health effects, emergency return vehicles would be recycled into permanent research bases.

== Initial and permanent settlement ==
Initial explorers leave equipment in orbit and at landing zones scattered considerable distances from the main settlement. Subsequent missions therefore are assumed to become easier and safer to undertake, with the likelihood of back-up equipment being present if accidents in transit or landing occur.

Large subsurface, pressurized habitats would be the first step toward human settlement; as Dr. Robert Zubrin suggests in the first chapter of his book Mars Direct, these structures can be built as Roman-style atria in mountainsides or underground with easily produced Martian brick. During and after this initial phase of habitat construction, hard-plastic radiation and abrasion-resistant geodesic domes could be deployed on the surface for eventual habitation and crop growth. Nascent industry would begin using indigenous resources: the manufacture of plastics, ceramics and glass could be easily achieved.

The longer-term work of terraforming Mars requires an initial phase of global warming to release atmosphere from the Martian regolith and to create a water-cycle. Three methods of global warming are described by Zubrin, who suggests they are best deployed in tandem: orbital mirrors to heat the surface; factories on the ground to pump halocarbons into the atmosphere; and the seeding of bacteria that can metabolize water, nitrogen and carbon to produce ammonia and methane (these gases would aid in global warming). While the work of terraforming Mars is on-going, robust settlement of Mars would continue.

Zubrin, in his 1996 book (revised 2011) The Case for Mars, acknowledges any Martian colony will be partially Earth-dependent for centuries. However, Zubrin suggests Mars may be profitable for two reasons. First, it may contain concentrated supplies of metals equal to or of greater value than silver, which have not been subjected to millennia of human scavenging; it is suggested such ores may be sold on Earth for profit. Secondly, the concentration of deuterium—an extremely expensive but essential fuel for the as-yet non-existent nuclear fusion power industry—is five times greater on Mars. Humans emigrating to Mars, under this paradigm, are presumed to have an industry; it is assumed the planet will be a magnet for settlers as wage costs will be high. Because of the labor shortage on Mars and its subsequent high pay-scale, Martian civilization and the value placed upon each individual's productivity is proposed as a future engine of both technological and social advancement.

== Risks ==
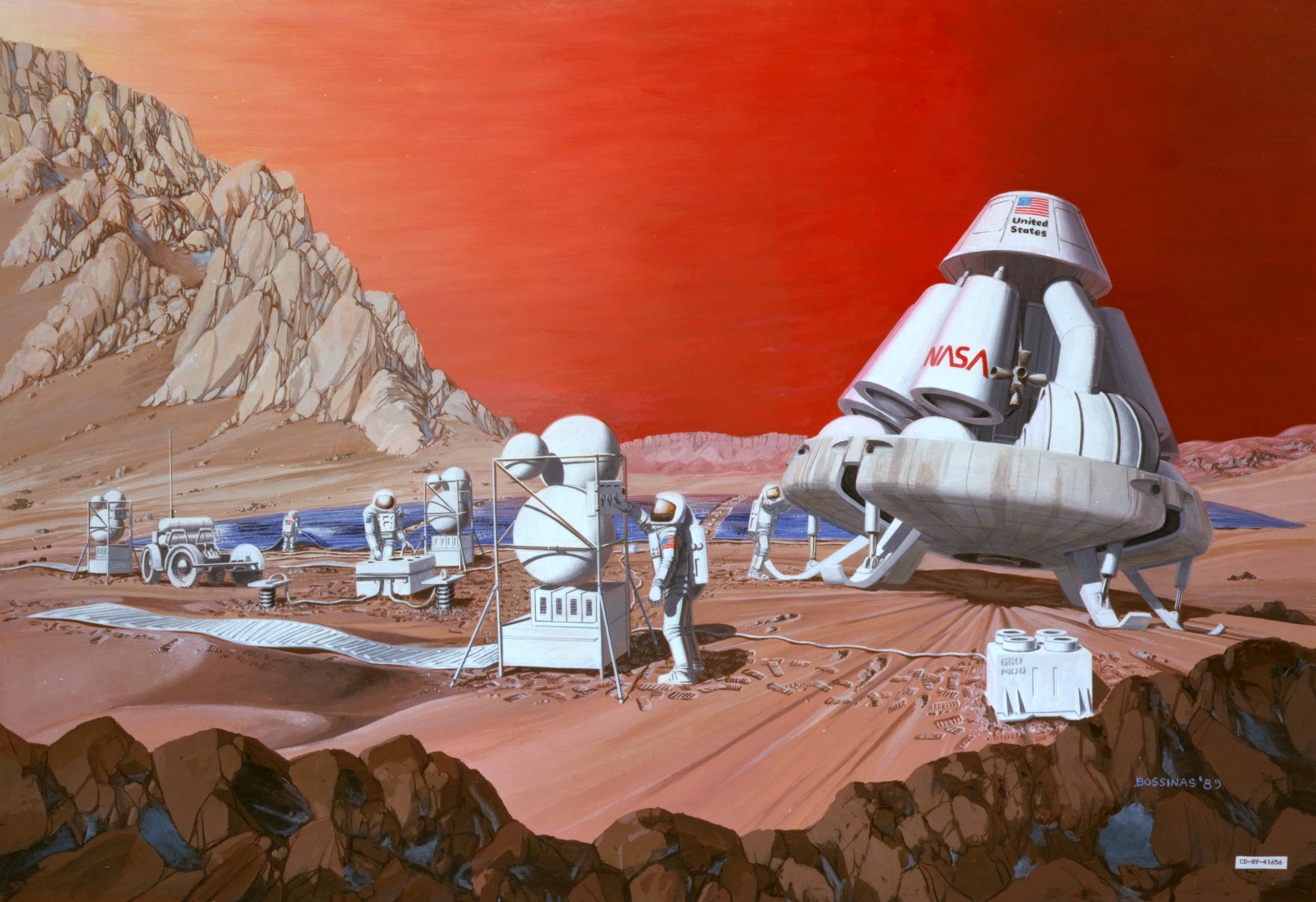
Artist's conception of a human mission on Mars 1989 painting by Les Bossinas of Lewis Research Center for NASA

In the fifth chapter of "Mars Direct", Zubrin addresses the idea that radiation and zero-gravity are unduly hazardous. He claims cancer rates do increase for astronauts who have spent extensive time in space, but only marginally. Similarly, while zero-gravity presents challenges, near total recovery of musculature and immune system vitality is presumed by all Mars to Stay mission plans once settlers are on the Martian surface. Several experiments, such as the Mars Gravity Biosatellite, have been proposed to test this hypothetical assumption, but until humans have lived in Martian gravity conditions (38% of Earth's), human long-term viability in such low gravity will remain only a working assumption. Back-contamination—humans acquiring and spreading hypothetical Martian viruses—is described as "just plain nuts", because there are no host organisms on Mars for disease organisms to have evolved.

In the same chapter, Zubrin rejects suggestions the Moon should be used as waypoint to Mars or as a preliminary training area. "It is ultimately much easier to journey to Mars from low Earth orbit than from the Moon and using the latter as a staging point is a pointless diversion of resources." While the Moon may superficially appear a good place to perfect Mars exploration and habitation techniques, the two bodies are radically different. The Moon has no atmosphere, no analogous geology and a much greater temperature range and rotational period of illumination. It is argued Antarctica, deserts of Earth, and precisely controlled chilled vacuum chambers on easily accessible NASA centers on Earth provide much better training grounds at lesser cost.

== Public reception ==
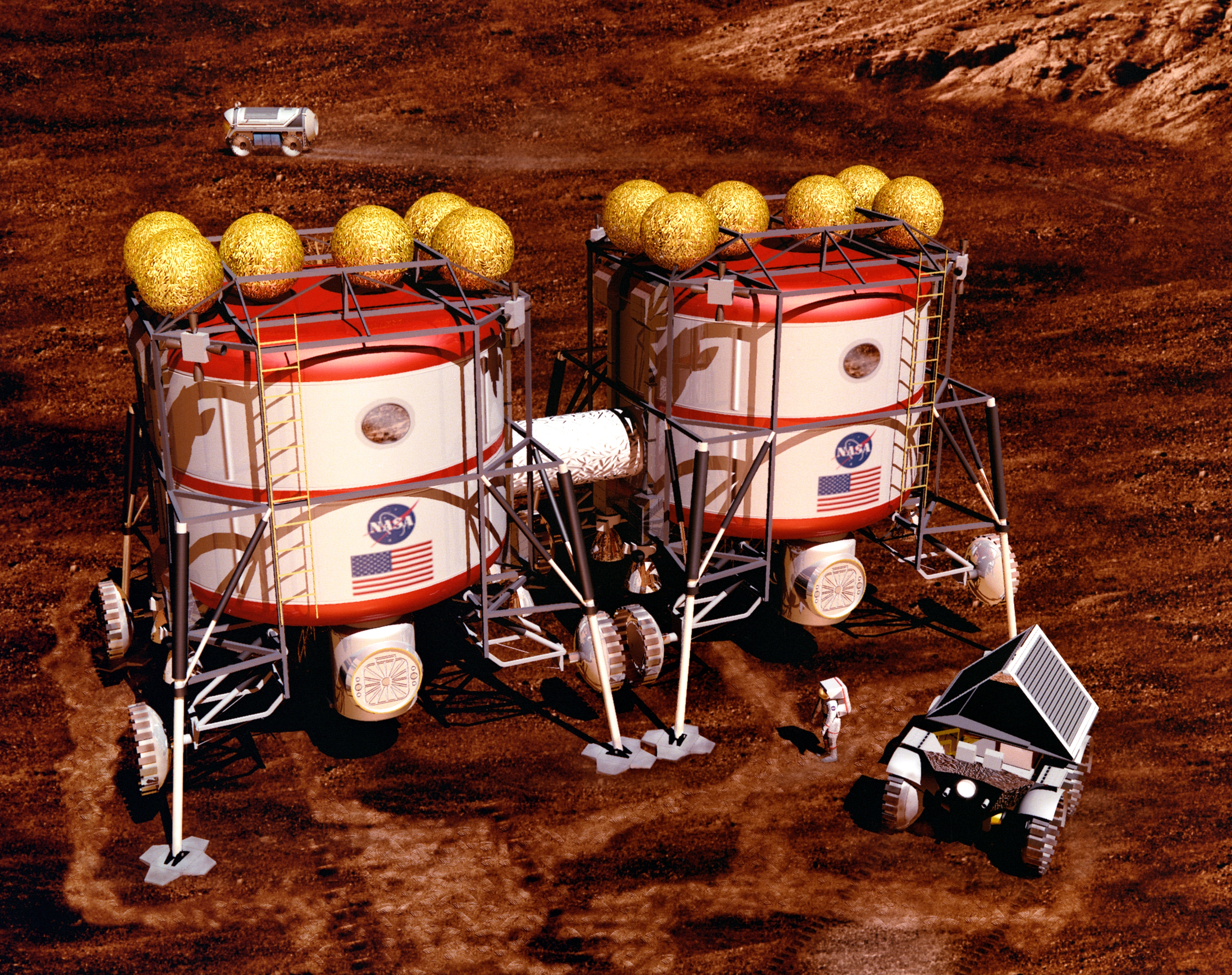
Artist's conception of a Mars Habitat 1993 by John Frassanito and Associates for NASA

"Should the United States space program send a mission to Mars, those astronauts should be prepared to stay there," said Lunar astronaut Buzz Aldrin during an interview on "Mars to Stay" initiative. The time and expense required to send astronauts to Mars, argues Aldrin, "warrants more than a brief sojourn, so those who are on board should think of themselves as pioneers. Like the Pilgrims who came to the New World or the families who headed to the Wild West, they should not plan on coming back home." The Moon is a shorter trip of two or three days, but according to Mars advocates it offers virtually no potential for independent settlements. Studies have found that Mars, on the other hand, has vast reserves of frozen water, all of the basic elements, and more closely mimics both gravitational (roughly 1/3 of Earth's while the moon is 1/6) and illumination conditions on Earth. "It is easier to subsist, to provide the support needed for people there than on the Moon." In an interview with reporters, Aldrin said Mars offers greater potential than Earth's satellite as a place for habitation:

If we are going to put a few people down there and ensure their appropriate safety, would you then go through all that trouble and then bring them back immediately, after a year, a year and a half? ... They need to go there more with the psychology of knowing that you are a pioneering settler and you don't look forward to go back home again after a couple of years.

A comprehensive statement of a rationale for "Mars to Stay" was laid out by Buzz Aldrin in a May 2009 Popular Mechanics article, as follows:

The agency's current Vision for Space Exploration will waste decades and hundreds of billions of dollars trying to reach the Moon by 2020—a glorified rehash of what we did 40 years ago. Instead of a steppingstone to Mars, NASA's current lunar plan is a detour. It will derail our Mars effort, siphoning off money and engineering talent for the next two decades. If we aspire to a long-term human presence on Mars—and I believe that should be our overarching goal for the foreseeable future—we must drastically change our focus. Our purely exploratory efforts should aim higher than a place we've already set foot on six times. In recent years my philosophy on colonizing Mars has evolved. I now believe that human visitors to the Red Planet should commit to staying there permanently. One-way tickets to Mars will make the missions technically easier and less expensive and get us there sooner. More importantly, they will ensure that our Martian outpost steadily grows as more homesteaders arrive. Instead of explorers, one-way Mars travelers will be 21st-century pilgrims, pioneering a new way of life. It will take a special kind of person. Instead of the traditional pilot/scientist/engineer, Martian homesteaders will be selected more for their personalities—flexible, inventive and determined in the face of unpredictability. In short, survivors.

The Mars Artists Community has adopted Mars to Stay as their primary policy initiative. During a 2009 public hearing of the U.S. Human Space Flight Plans Committee at which Dr. Robert Zubrin presented a summary of the arguments in his book The Case for Mars, dozens of placards reading "Mars Direct Cowards Return to the Moon" were placed throughout the Carnegie Institute. The passionate uproar among space exploration advocates—both favorable and critical—resulted in the Mars Artists Community creating several dozen more designs, with such slogans as, "Traitors Return to Earth" and "What Would Zheng He Do?"

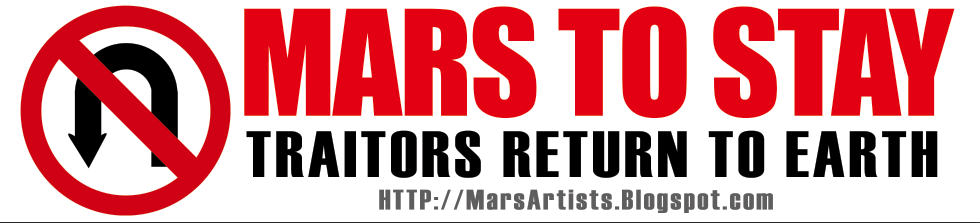
Mars Artists design, August 2009

In October 2009, Eric Berger of the Houston Chronicle wrote of "Mars to Stay" as perhaps the only program that can revitalize the United States' space program:

What if NASA could land astronauts on Mars in a decade, for not ridiculously more money than the $10 billion the agency spends annually on human spaceflight? It's possible ... relieving NASA of the need to send fuel and rocketry to blast humans off the Martian surface, which has slightly more than twice the gravity of the moon, would actually reduce costs by about a factor of 10, by some estimates.

Hard Science Fiction writer Mike Brotherton has found "Mars to Stay" appealing for both economic and safety reasons, but more emphatically, as a fulfillment of the ultimate mandate by which "our manned space program is sold, at least philosophically and long-term, as a step to colonizing other worlds". Two-thirds of the respondents to a poll on his website expressed interest in a one-way ticket to Mars "if mission parameters are well-defined" (not suicidal).

In June 2010, Buzz Aldrin gave an interview to Vanity Fair in which he restated "Mars to Stay":

Did the Pilgrims on the Mayflower sit around Plymouth Rock waiting for a return trip? They came here to settle. And that's what we should be doing on Mars. When you go to Mars, you need to have made the decision that you're there permanently. The more people we have there, the more it can become a sustaining environment. Except for very rare exceptions, the people who go to Mars shouldn't be coming back. Once you get on the surface, you're there.

An article by Dirk Schulze-Makuch (Washington State University) and Paul Davies (Arizona State University) from the book The Human Mission to Mars: Colonizing the Red Planet summarizes their rationale for Mars to Stay:

[Mars to stay] would obviate the need for years of rehabilitation for returning astronauts, which would not be an issue if the astronauts were to remain in the low-gravity environment of Mars. We envision that Mars exploration would begin and proceed for a long time on the basis of outbound journeys only.

In November 2010, Keith Olbermann started an interview with Derrick Pitts, Planetarium Director at the Franklin Institute in Philadelphia, by quoting from the Dirk Schulze-Makuch and Paul Davies article, saying, "The Astronauts would go to Mars with the intention of staying for the rest of their lives, as trailblazers of a permanent human Mars colony." In response to Olbermann's statement that "the authors claim a one-way ticket to Mars is no more outlandish than a one-way ticket to America was in 1620", Pitts defends Mars to Stay initiatives by saying "they begin to open the doors in a way that haven't been opened before".

In a January 2011 interview, X Prize founder Peter Diamandis expressed his preference for Mars to Stay research settlements:

Privately funded missions are the only way to go to Mars with humans because I think the best way to go is on "one-way" colonization flights and no government will likely sanction such a risk. The timing for this could well be within the next 20 years. It will fall within the hands of a small group of tech billionaires who view such missions as the way to leave their mark on humanity.

In March 2011, Apollo 14 pilot Edgar Mitchell and Apollo 17's geologist Harrison Schmitt, among other noted Mars exploration advocates published an anthology of Mars to Stay architectures titled, A One Way Mission to Mars: Colonizing the Red Planet. From the publisher's review:

Answers are provided by a veritable who's who of the top experts in the world. And what would it be like to live on Mars? What dangers would they face? Learn first hand, in the final, visionary chapter about life in a Martian colony, and the adventures of a young woman, Aurora, who is born on Mars. Exploration, discovery, and journeys into the unknown are part of the human spirit. Colonizing the cosmos is our destiny. The Greatest Adventure in the History of Humanity awaits us. Onward to Mars!

August 2011, Professor Paul Davies gave a plenary address to the opening session of the 14th Annual International Mars Society Convention on cost-effective human mission plans for Mars titled "One-Way Mission to Mars".

== New York Times op-eds ==
"Mars to Stay" has been explicitly proposed by two op-ed pieces in The New York Times.

Following a similar line of argument to Buzz Aldrin, Lawrence Krauss asks in an op-ed, "Why are we so interested in bringing the Mars astronauts home again?" While the idea of sending astronauts aloft never to return may be jarring upon first hearing, the rationale for one-way exploration and settlement trips has both historical and practical roots. For example, colonists and pilgrims seldom set off to the New World with the expectation of a return trip. As Lawrence Krauss writes, "To boldly go where no one has gone before does not require coming home again."

If it sounds unrealistic to suggest that astronauts would be willing to leave home never to return ... consider the results of several informal surveys I and several colleagues have conducted recently. One of my peers in Arizona recently accompanied a group of scientists and engineers from the Jet Propulsion Laboratory on a geological survey. He asked how many would be willing to go on a one-way mission into space. Every member of the group raised their hand.

Additional immediate and pragmatic reasons to consider one-way human space exploration missions are explored by Krauss. Since much of the cost of a voyage to Mars will be spent on returning to Earth, if the fuel for the return is carried on board, this greatly increases the mission mass requirement – that in turn requires even more fuel. According to Krauss, "Human space travel is so expensive and so dangerous ... we are going to need novel, even extreme solutions if we really want to expand the range of human civilization beyond our own planet." Delivering food and supplies to pioneers via uncrewed spacecraft is less expensive than designing an immediate return trip.

In an earlier 2004 op-ed for The New York Times, Paul Davies says motivation for the less expensive, permanent "one-way to stay option" arises from a theme common in "Mars to Stay" advocacy: "Mars is one of the few accessible places beyond Earth that could have sustained life [... and] alone among our sister planets, it is able to support a permanent human presence."

Why is going to Mars so expensive? ... It takes a lot of fuel to blast off Mars and get back home. If the propellant has to be transported there from Earth, costs of a launching soar. Without some radical improvements in technology, the prospects for sending astronauts on a round-trip to Mars any time soon are slim, whatever the presidential rhetoric. What's more, the president's suggestion of using the Moon as a base — a place to assemble equipment and produce fuel for a Mars mission less expensively — has the potential to turn into a costly sideshow. There is, however, an obvious way to slash the costs and bring Mars within reach of early human exploration. The answer lies with a one-way mission.

Davies argues that since "some people gleefully dice with death in the name of sport or adventure [and since] dangerous occupations that reduce life expectancy through exposure to hazardous conditions or substances are commonplace", we ought to not find the risks involved in a Mars to Stay architecture unusual. "A century ago, explorers set out to trek across Antarctica in the full knowledge that they could die in the process, and that even if they succeeded their health might be irreversibly harmed. Yet governments and scientific societies were willing sponsors of these enterprises." Davies then asks, "Why should it be different today?"

== See also ==
- Colonization of Mars
- Effect of spaceflight on the human body – Medical issues associated with spaceflight
- Health threat from cosmic rays – Cancer causing exposure to ionizing radiation in spaceflight
- Human outpost – Human habitats located in environments inhospitable for humans
- Human spaceflight – Spaceflight with a crew or passengers
- In situ resource utilization – Astronautical use of materials harvested in outer space
- Inspiration Mars Foundation – Defunct, proposed a crewed flyby mission
- List of crewed Mars mission plans
- List of missions to Mars
- Human mission to Mars – Proposed concepts
- Mars analog habitat – Research simulating the environment on Mars
- Mars Direct – Proposal for a crewed Mars mission
- Mars One – Defunct foundation and company that promoted Mars colonization
- NewSpace – Spaceflight not by a government
- Space medicine – Application of medicine during spaceflight
- Terraforming of Mars – Hypothetical modification of Mars into an Earth-like habitable planet
- The Case for Mars – Robert Zubrin book on potential colonization
