= Austere Human Missions to Mars =

NASA concept for a human Mars mission

Austere Human Missions to Mars is a concept for a human mission to Mars by the United States space agency, NASA. Released in 2009, it proposed a modified and even less costly version of Design Reference Architecture (DRA) 5.0, itself a combination of nearly 20 years of Mars planning design work. The mission profile was for a conjunction class with a long surface stay, pre-deployed cargo, aerocapture and propulsive capture, and some in-situ resource production. As of 2015, the concept had not yet been adapted to the Space Launch System that replaced NASA's Constellation program in 2011.

== Key measures ==
Technologically and financially the concept remains conservative, with both peak yearly and total funding to be less than the ISS up to the first mission. The plan would use standardized systems to launch a crew of 4 every four years, but accomplish the same major goals as DRA 5.0, which included a crew of six.

Scaled down from DRA 5.0 and its requirements, it claims to be still acceptable from a science and exploration standpoint.

Simplifications and cost cutting are obtained mainly by avoiding high risk or high cost technology development and maximizing development and production commonality:

- Using a blunt-body entry vehicle having no deployable decelerators
- Aerobraking rather than aerocapture for placing the crewed element into low Mars orbit
- Avoiding the use of liquid hydrogen with its low temperature and large volume issues
- Standard bipropellant propulsion for the landers and ascent vehicle
- Radioisotope surface power systems rather than a nuclear reactor or large area deployable solar arrays
- Multiple Ares V launchers used for setting up and maintaining the Mars installations

== Mission ==
=== Equipment ===
The mission comprises the following basic equipment:

- Crew exploration vehicle (CEV, Orion class), lifts the crew to earth orbit where it docks to the Transit Hab, and takes it down to earth on return
- Mars Transit Habitat (TransHab), takes the crew to Mars orbit and stays there until a crew returns, shielded against radiation, supports a crew of four for up to three years
- Mars descent/ascent vehicle (MDV and MAV), takes the crew from the orbit down to Mars surface and vice versa
- Contingency Consumables Module (CCM), can be jettisoned if depleted
- Mars surface habitat (SurfHab), where the crew lives on the planet, transferred once in advance
- Surface Power and Logistics Module, transferred once in advance to provide basic surface machinery

=== Procedures ===
A standardized liquid oxygen/liquid hydrogen (LOX/LH2) propulsive stage, like Ares V or its follower SLS Block 2, would send the Descent/Ascent Vehicle (DAV), Mars Surface Habitat and Cargo elements to Mars orbit uncrewed. The DAV would aerocapture into Mars orbit, preparing it for rendezvous with the crewed Transit Habitat to arrive later. The Surface Habitat and Cargo would likely do direct entry. One advantage of the combined Descent/Ascent Vehicle as the spacecraft used for the crewed landing, is that it could perform an abort to orbit. A number of technologies for the descent stages were looked at, especially supersonic retro-propulsion for Mars atmospheric entry, but were otherwise very traditional with a large heat shield and retro rockets for final landing.

Some concepts for the Surface Habitat include an inflatable structure and using the descent propellant tanks for waste storage. Estimated Mass of the Surface Habitat in the study was 52 metric tons. The Power/Logistics lander had the same predicted Mass (they would weigh less on Mars than on Earth). The Power/Logistic module would contain 2 Pressurized Rovers, with space for 2-Crew each. The pressurized rovers would be powered by a 5 kilowatt Stirling radioisotope generator on each rover. The P/L module would also include 2 mobile generators for surface power, as well as additional consumables and science equipment.

The surface habitat would have two 5 kilowatt radioisotope Stirling generators and an ISRU oxygen generator. Unlike DRA 5.0 or Mars Direct however, In-situ resource utilization (ISRU) would not be used to produce propellent for the ascent into Mars orbit.

After remote controlled deployment of this equipment on Mars, the Transit Habitat would carry the crew to the planet where it docks with the pre-sent MAV. The MAV lands on the surface where the crew lives in the habitat supported by the power and logistics module. After finishing their research they use the ascent vehicle to return to the Mars Transit Habitat, see also Mars Orbit Rendezvous. It brings them back to earth orbit, from where they return to the surface with the Orion spacecraft.

== See also ==
- Advanced Stirling radioisotope generator
- Mars Design Reference Mission
