= The Millennial Project =

Book by Marshall Savage

The Millennial Project: Colonizing the Galaxy in Eight Easy Steps
- Author: Marshall T. Savage
- Illustrator: Keith Spangle
- Language: English
- Subject: Space Colonization Advocacy
- Genre: Futurology
- Publisher: Little, Brown and Company
- Publication date: 1992 and 1994
- Publication place: United States
- Media type: Print (Hardcover)
- Pages: 508 pp
- ISBN: 0-316-77165-1
- OCLC: 30319063
- Dewey Decimal: 629.4 20
- LC Class: TL795.7 .S28 1994

The Millennial Project: Colonizing the Galaxy in Eight Easy Steps by Marshall T. Savage is a book (published in 1992 and reprinted in 1994 with an introduction by Arthur C. Clarke) in the field of exploratory engineering that gives a series of concrete stages the author believes will lead to interstellar colonization. Many specific scientific and engineering details are presented, as are numerous issues involved in space colonization.

== The book's thesis ==
Savage takes a Malthusian view of the exponential growth of human population and life in general, and also recommends the exponential growth of blue-green algae for sustenance. He states that it is humanity's destiny to colonize every star in the galaxy. He draws heavily on the Fermi paradox (briefly stated as, "If there is intelligent life in space, why haven't we found it yet?") to support his position that it is humanity's burden alone to ignite the universe with the "spark of Life." In The Millennial Project, he calls for the creation of an international foundation to realize these goals. Originally known as the First Millennial Foundation (founded by Savage in 1987), the organization changed its name to the Living Universe Foundation.

== The steps of the project ==
The "Eight Easy Steps" proposed by Savage are as follows:

1. Foundation – constitute an organization convened to realize these destinies.
2. Aquarius – build arcologies in the tropical oceans as a first step to learning how to build ("grow") colonies in space using a method not unlike that used by living corals developed by Prof. Wolf Hartmut Hilbertz and applying his concept of Cybertecture. They also would generate income to fund later steps.
3. Bifrost – first step in actually getting off the Earth using ground-based free-electron-laser-powered laser-propelled Waverider. Leik Myrabo, an aerospace engineering professor at Rensselaer Polytechnic Institute, demonstrated the feasibility of using ground-based lasers to propel objects into orbit in 1988.
4. Asgard – build a space station in geosynchronous orbit.
5. Avalon – build colonies on the Moon by doming over the craters and creating miniature ecologies.
6. Elysium – start terraforming Mars to "create a living planet to sustain us" connected with Earth through Buzz Aldrin's proposed Mars Transit System, an example of Earth-Mars cycler.
7. Solaria – mine asteroids to create asteroid colonies and Asgard-like stations throughout the Solar System to create a Dyson cloud.
8. Galactia – colonize beyond the Solar System, expand throughout the galaxy heading to a level 3 on the Kardashev scale, a method of measuring a civilization's level of energy production and consumption.

In the early stages of the Project, Savage recommends Spirulina algae as a primary foodstuff, supplemented by seafood mariculture from the cities of the Aquarius phase.

The Living Universe Foundation, previously known as the First Millennial Foundation, is an organization that supports ocean and space colonization more or less based upon the book The Millennial Project. Space Environments Ecovillage in Bastrop, Texas, is one of the few LUF projects that have materialized so far.

== Criticisms ==
The book has drawn some criticism in that while it is replete with details concerning OTEC construction and space colonization, it touches very little on the subject of how governments and societies will need to change to enact the Project. Defenders and the author himself maintain that one man writing one book cannot be expected to write out the entire course of human development over the next millennium.

== See also ==
- Mining the Sky by John S. Lewis
- The Case For Mars by Robert Zubrin
- The High Frontier: Human Colonies in Space by Gerard O'Neill
- Engines of Creation by K. Eric Drexler
- Antimatter rocket
- Asteroid mining
- Beam-powered propulsion
- Closed Ecological Life Support System or CELSS
- Inflatable space habitat
- In-Situ Resource Utilization
- Kessler Syndrome
- Lightcraft
- Mass launcher
- Ocean thermal energy conversion
- Project Valkyrie
- Biorock
- Space geostrategy
- Terraforming of Mars
- Prof. Wolf Hartmut Hilbertz
- Human outpost
