= First Landing =

2002 novel by Robert Zubrin

First Landing is a 2002 science fiction novel by Robert Zubrin that tells the story of the first crewed space expedition to Mars. Zubrin is the head of the Mars Society, an organization lobbying the real world NASA to send astronauts to Mars. The plan used to accomplish their mission in the book is the same one advocated by his group.

In the novel, the explorers discover bacteria life on Mars and are abandoned due to political circumstances, and must fend for themselves if they want to return to Earth, thus highlighting many of the more robust features of Zubrin's plan for Mars.

Zubrin also wrote The Case for Mars, a detailed nonfiction explanation of the same plan.

== Editions ==
- ISBN 0-441-00963-8 (paperback, 2002)
- ISBN 0-441-00859-3 (hardcover, 2002)
