= Mining the Sky =

Non-fiction book by John S. Lewis published in 1997

Mining the Sky: Untold Riches from the Asteroids, Comets, and Planets
- Author: John S. Lewis
- Subject: Asteroid mining
- ISBN: 0-201-32819-4

Mining the Sky: Untold Riches from the Asteroids, Comets, and Planets is a 1997 book by University of Arizona Planetary Sciences professor emeritus John S. Lewis that describes possible routes for accessing extraterrestrial resources, either for use on Earth or for enabling space colonization. Each issue or proposal is evaluated for its effects on humanity, physics and economic feasibility based on planetary science. For instance, Chapter 5 ("Asteroids and Comets in our Backyard") exhaustively catalogs the types of near-Earth objects (asteroids and extinct comets whose orbits intersect Earth's), assessing both the harms likely from possible collisions with Earth (the subject of Lewis's previous book, Rain of Iron and Ice) on the one hand, and their potential for profitable exploitation on the other.

To illustrate this potential, Lewis includes an order-of-magnitude estimate of the economic value of the smallest known metallic (M-type) near-Earth asteroid: 3554 Amun. With its diameter of 2 kilometers and assumed composition similar to typical iron-type meteorites, he calculated a mass of 3×10^{10} (30 billion) tons and a 1996 market value of $8 trillion for its iron and nickel alone, another $6 trillion for its cobalt, and $6 trillion more for its platinum-group metals. (Of course these numerical values must not be taken too seriously, partly due to the large variations in commodity prices with time, and even more because of the great impact on market prices such huge quantities of materials—especially precious materials—would inevitably have. They merely serve to suggest that the economic benefits of obtaining such enormous resources would probably far exceed the costs involved in accessing them.)

In general, like previous space advocates such as Princeton's Gerard K. O'Neill, Lewis responds to the limits to growth on Earth with detailed plans to first ameliorate them by accessing space resources on Earth, followed by human space colonization of the entire Solar System. In this light, he asserts that "Shortage of resources is not a fact; it is an illusion born of ignorance". He claims that colonies built with the natural resources of the asteroid belt alone, including limitless space-based solar power, could eventually support a vast civilization of "several tens of quadrillion (10^{16})s of people". He closes the book with an assertion that this vast population could be a very good thing. "Intelligent life, once liberated by the resources of space, is the greatest resource in the solar system ... the highest fulfillment of life is unbounded intelligence and compassion"

== See also ==
- The Millennial Project: Colonizing the Galaxy in Eight Easy Steps by space advocate Marshall Savage
- The Case for Mars: The Plan to Settle the Red Planet and Why We Must by space advocate Robert Zubrin
- The High Frontier: Human Colonies in Space by Gerard K. O'Neill
- Space advocacy
- Outline of space technology
- Space colonization
- Space-based solar power
- Asteroid mining
- Space elevator
- Skyhook (structure)
