= 3554 Amun =

Aten asteroid

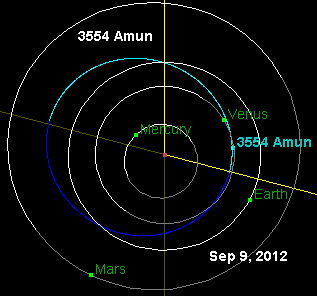
- Orbit diagram of asteroid Amun with location as of September 9, 2012

Discovery
- Discovered by: C. Shoemaker; E. M. Shoemaker
- Discovery date: 4 March 1986

Designations
- Named after: Amun
- Alternative designations: 1986 EB
- Minor planet category: Aten; Venus-crosser asteroid

Orbital characteristics
- Epoch 13 January 2016 (JD 2457400.5)
- Uncertainty parameter 0
- Observation arc: 10923 days (29.91 yr)
- Aphelion: 1.24677 AU (186.514 Gm)
- Perihelion: 0.700578 AU (104.8050 Gm)
- Semi-major axis: 0.973675 AU (145.6597 Gm)
- Eccentricity: 0.28048
- Orbital period (sidereal): 0.961 yr (350.9 d)
- Mean anomaly: 184.781°
- Mean motion: 1.02585°/day
- Inclination: 23.3626°
- Longitude of ascending node: 358.627°
- Argument of perihelion: 359.392°
- Earth MOID: 0.250204 AU (37.4300 Gm)

Physical characteristics
- Mean diameter: 3.341 km
- Mass: ~ 1.6×10^{13} kg
- Synodic rotation period: 2.53001 h (0.105417 d)
- Geometric albedo: 0.1284±0.024
- Spectral type: M-type asteroid
- Absolute magnitude (H): 15.82

3554 Amun is an Aten asteroid, meaning it crosses Earth's orbit, and a Venus-crosser. It was discovered on 4 March 1986 by Carolyn and Eugene Shoemaker at Mount Palomar Observatory, and named for the ancient Egyptian deity Amun. Amun was the fifth Aten asteroid to be numbered.

Photometric observations of 3554 Amun during 2017–2018 were combined to determine a rotation period of 2.53029±0.00002 hours. It has been classified as an M-type asteroid in the Tholen taxonomy, X-type in the Bus taxonomy, and C-, X-, and D-type in the Bus-DeMeo taxonomy. The featureless optical spectrum has a similar slope to the Tagish Lake meteorite, although 3554 Amun is not considered the source. The infrared spectrum of 3554 Amun was found to match a D-type asteroid taxonomy. The estimated diameter is 3.341 kilometers, making it one of the smallest known asteroids to have an M-type classification.

Amun was once considered metallic, based on an M-type optical spectrum. In Mining the Sky, planetary scientist John S. Lewis calculated the purported value of a metallic 3554 Amun at $20 trillion. (6178) 1986 DA is another M-type near-Earth asteroid with lower inclination that is actually metallic.

Amun passes close to Venus, and in 1964, 2034, and 2103 comes within 10 million km of it.
