= John S. Lewis =

American planetary scientist (born 1941)

- Born: John Simpson Lewis Jr. June 27, 1941 (age 85); Trenton, New Jersey
- Education: Princeton University; Dartmouth College; University of California, San Diego
- Spouse: Peg
- Awards: James B Macelwayne Award of the American Geophysical Union, NASA Exceptional Scientific Achievement Medal
- Scientific career
- Fields: chemistry of the Solar System, space resources, impact hazards
- Thesis: (1968)
- Doctoral advisor: Harold Urey
- Other academic advisors: George B. Field, Alexander Kaczmarczyk, Robert Pease
- Notable students: David Grinspoon; Thomas David Jones; Stewart Nozette

John S. Lewis (born June 27, 1941) is a Professor Emeritus of planetary science at the University of Arizona’s Lunar and Planetary Laboratory. His interests in the chemistry and formation of the Solar System and the economic development of space have made him a leading proponent of turning potentially hazardous near-Earth objects into attractive space resources.

== Career ==
The son of John Simpson Lewis, a YMCA professional, and Elsie Dinsmore Vandenbergh, a school teacher. Lewis received his B.S. in chemistry from Princeton University in 1962 as a National Merit Scholar. He then continued his education at Dartmouth College receiving his M.A. in inorganic chemistry in 1964. He received his Ph.D in geochemistry and cosmochemistry from University of California, San Diego in 1968, where he studied under Harold Urey. Prior to joining the University of Arizona, Lewis taught space sciences and cosmochemistry at the Massachusetts Institute of Technology.

An expert on the composition and chemistry of asteroids and comets, Lewis has written such popular science books as Rain of Iron and Ice and Mining the Sky: Untold Riches from the Asteroids, Comets, and Planets. Lewis is a frequent commentator on the Chinese network CCTV when China broadcasts its major missions live.

He was a member of the Board of Directors of American Rocket Company and is currently Chief Scientist at Deep Space Industries.

Raised a Presbyterian, Lewis became a Mormon, in 1980.

In February 2013, Lewis assumed the role of Chief Scientist for the firm Deep Space Industries. Lewis focuses on strategic planning, mission development and processing concepts for Deep Space.

== Publications ==
- Lewis, John S.; Prinn, Ronald G. (1984). Planets and Their Atmospheres: Origin and Evolution. Academic Press. ISBN 0124465803.
- Lewis, John S.; Lewis, Ruth A. (1987). Space Resources: Breaking the Bonds of Earth. Columbia University Press. ISBN 0231064985.
- Lewis, John S.; Matthews, Mildred Shapley (1993). Resources of Near-Earth Space. University of Arizona Press. ISBN 0816514046.
- Lewis, John S. (1995). Physics and Chemistry of the Solar System. Elsevier Science. ISBN 0124467407.
- Lewis, John S. (1996). Rain of Iron and Ice: The Very Real Threat of Comet and Asteroid Bombardment. Basic Books. ISBN 0201489503.
- Lewis, John; Lewis, Professor John S. (1997). Mining the Sky: Untold Riches from the Asteroids, Comets, and Planets. Basic Books. ISBN 0201479591.
- Lewis, John S. (1998). Worlds Without End: The Exploration of Planets Known and Unknown. Basic Books. ISBN 0738200115.
- Lewis, John S.; Lewis, Professor John S. (2000). Comet and Asteroid Impact Hazards on a Populated Earth: Computer Modeling. Academic Press. ISBN 0124467601.
- Lewis, John S. (2014). Asteroid mining 101: wealth for a new space economy. Deep Space Industries Incorporated. ISBN 978-0-9905842-0-9.

== See also ==
- Marshall Savage - author of The Millennial Project: Colonizing the Galaxy in Eight Easy Steps
- Gerard O'Neill - author of The High Frontier: Human Colonies in Space
- James Benson - founder of the SpaceDev company
- The Case for Mars: The Plan to Settle the Red Planet and Why We Must by Robert Zubrin
- Engines of Creation by K. Eric Drexler
- Asteroid 3554 Amun
