= Mars Direct =

Proposal for a crewed Mars mission

Mars Direct is a proposal for a human mission to Mars which purports to be both cost-effective and possible with current technology. It was originally detailed in a research paper by Martin Marietta engineers Robert Zubrin and David Baker in 1990, and later expanded upon in Zubrin's 1996 book The Case for Mars. It now serves as a staple of Zubrin's speaking engagements and general advocacy as head of the Mars Society, an organization devoted to the colonization of Mars.

== History ==
=== Space Exploration Initiative ===
On July 20, 1989, US President George H. W. Bush announced plans for what came to be known as the Space Exploration Initiative (SEI). In a speech on the steps of the National Air and Space Museum he described long-term plans which would culminate in a human mission to the surface of Mars.

By December 1990, a study to estimate the project's cost determined that long-term expenditure would total approximately 450 billion dollars spread over 20 to 30 years. The "90 Day Study" as it came to be known (also "90 Day Report" from people such as Zubrin), evoked a hostile Congressional reaction towards SEI given that it would have required the largest single government expenditure since World War II. Within a year, all funding requests for SEI had been denied.

Dan Goldin became NASA Administrator on April 1, 1992, officially abandoning plans for near-term human exploration beyond Earth orbit with the shift towards a "faster, better, cheaper" strategy for robotic exploration.

=== Development ===
While working at Martin Marietta designing interplanetary mission architectures, Robert Zubrin perceived a fundamental flaw in the SEI program. Zubrin came to understand that if NASA's plan was to fully utilize as many technologies as possible in support of sending the mission to Mars, it would become politically untenable. In his own words:

The exact opposite of the correct way to do engineering.

Zubrin's alternative to this "Battlestar Galactica" mission strategy (dubbed so by its detractors for the large, nuclear powered spaceships that supposedly resembled the science-fiction spaceship of the same name) involved a longer surface stay, a faster flight-path in the form of a conjunction class mission, in situ resource utilization and craft launched directly from the surface of Earth to Mars as opposed to be being assembled in orbit or by a space-based drydock. After receiving approval from management at Marietta, a 12-man team within the company began to work out the details of the mission. While they focused primarily on more traditional mission architectures, Zubrin began to collaborate with colleague David Baker's extremely simple, stripped-down and robust strategy. Their goal to "use local resources, travel light, and live off the land" became the hallmark of Mars Direct.

== Mission scenario ==
=== First launch ===
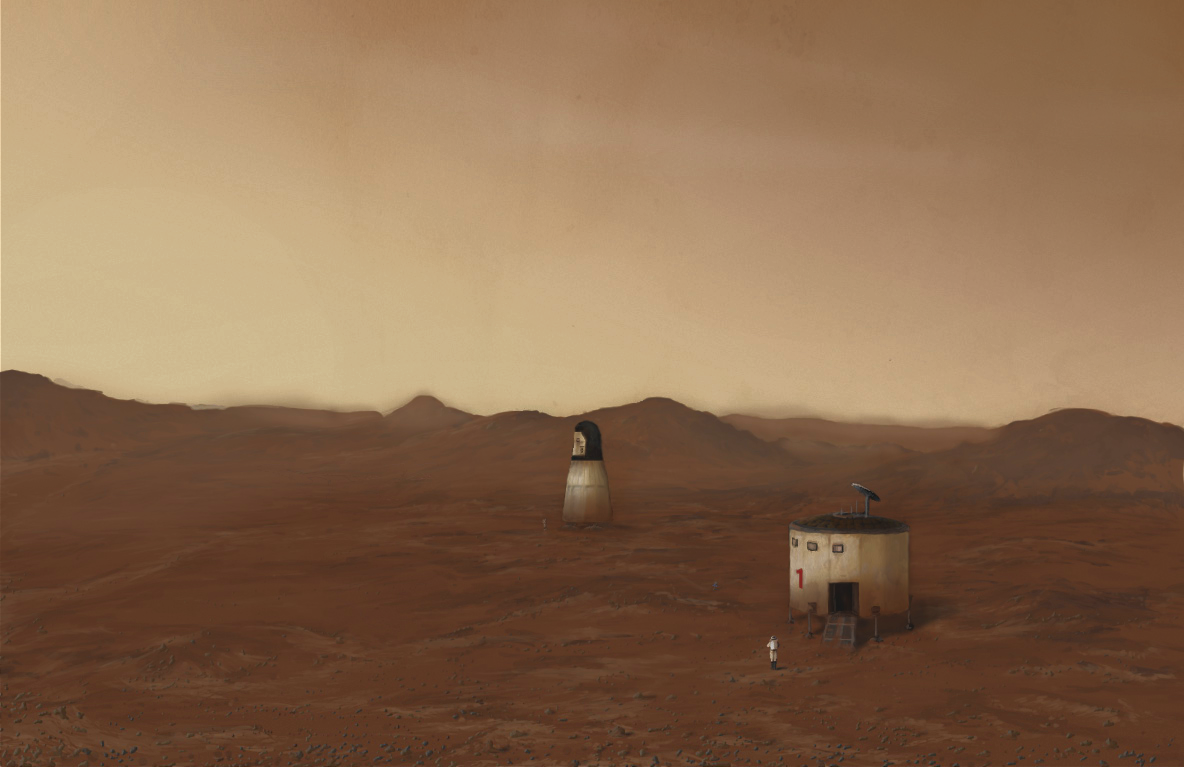
Artist depiction of the Habitat Unit and the Earth Return Vehicle on Mars

The first flight of the Ares rocket (not to be confused with the similarly named rocket of the now defunct Constellation program) would take an uncrewed Earth Return Vehicle to Mars after a 6-month cruise phase, with a supply of hydrogen, a chemical plant and a small nuclear reactor. Once there, a series of chemical reactions (the Sabatier reaction coupled with electrolysis) would be used to combine a small amount of hydrogen (8 tons) carried by the Earth Return Vehicle with the carbon dioxide of the Martian atmosphere to create up to 112 tonnes of methane and oxygen. This relatively simple chemical-engineering procedure was used regularly in the 19th and 20th centuries, and would ensure that only 7% of the return propellant would need to be carried to the surface of Mars.

96 tonnes of methane and oxygen would be needed to send the Earth Return Vehicle on a trajectory back home at the conclusion of the surface stay; the rest would be available for Mars rovers. The process of generating fuel is expected to require approximately ten months to complete.

=== Second launch ===
Some 26 months after the Earth Return Vehicle is originally launched from Earth, a second vehicle, the Mars Habitat Unit, would be launched on a 6-month long low-energy transfer trajectory to Mars, and would carry a crew of four astronauts (the minimum number required so that the team can be split in two without leaving anyone alone). The Habitat Unit would not be launched until the automated factory aboard the ERV had signaled the successful production of chemicals required for operation on the planet and the return trip to Earth. During the trip, artificial gravity would be generated by tethering the Habitat Unit to the spent upper stage of the booster, and setting them rotating about a common axis. This rotation would produce a comfortable 1 g working environment for the astronauts, freeing them of the debilitating effects of long-term exposure to weightlessness.

==== Landing and surface operations ====
Upon reaching Mars, the upper stage would be jettisoned, with the Habitat Unit aerobraking into Mars orbit before soft-landing in proximity to the Earth Return Vehicle. Precise landing would be supported by a radar beacon started by the first lander. Once on Mars, the crew would spend 18 months on the surface, carrying out a range of scientific research, aided by a small rover vehicle carried aboard their Mars Habitat Unit, and powered by the methane produced by the Earth Return Vehicle.

==== Return and follow-up missions ====
To return, the crew would use the Earth Return Vehicle, leaving the Mars Habitat Unit for the possible use of subsequent explorers. On the return trip to Earth, the propulsion stage of the Earth Return Vehicle would be used as a counterweight to generate artificial gravity for the trip back.

Follow-up missions would be dispatched at 2 year intervals to Mars to ensure that a redundant ERV would be on the surface at all times, waiting to be used by the next crewed mission or the current crew in an emergency. In such an emergency scenario, the crew would trek hundreds of kilometers to the other ERV in their long-range vehicle.

== Components ==
The Mars Direct proposal includes a component for a Launch Vehicle "Ares", an Earth Return Vehicle (ERV) and a Mars Habitat Unit (MHU).

=== Launch Vehicle ===
The plan involves several launches making use of heavy-lift boosters of similar size to the Saturn V used for the Apollo missions, which would potentially be derived from Space Shuttle components. This proposed rocket is dubbed "Ares", which would use space shuttle Advanced Solid Rocket Boosters, a modified shuttle external tank, and a new Lox/LH2 third stage for the trans-Mars injection of the payload. Ares would put 121 tonnes into a 300 km circular orbit, and boost 47 tonnes toward Mars.

=== Earth Return Vehicle ===
The Earth Return Vehicle is a two-stage vehicle. The upper stage comprises the living accommodation for the crew during their six-month return trip to Earth from Mars. The lower stage contains the vehicle's rocket engines and a small chemical production plant.

=== Mars Habitat Unit ===
The Mars Habitat Unit is a 2- or 3-deck vehicle providing a comprehensive living and working environment for a Mars crew. In addition to individual sleeping quarters which provide a degree of privacy for each of the crew and a place for personal effects, the Mars Habitat Unit includes a communal living area, a small galley, exercise area, and hygiene facilities with closed-cycle water purification. The lower deck of the Mars Habitat Unit provides the primary working space for the crew: small laboratory areas for carrying out geology and life science research; storage space for samples, airlocks for reaching the surface of Mars, and a suiting-up area where crew members prepare for surface operations. Protection from harmful radiation while in space and on the surface of Mars (e.g. from solar flares) would be provided by a dedicated "storm shelter" in the core of the vehicle.

The Mars Habitat Unit would also include a small pressurized rover that is stored in the lower deck area and assembled on the surface of Mars. Powered by a methane engine, it is designed to extend the range over which astronauts can explore the surface of Mars out to 320 km.

Since it was first proposed as a part of Mars Direct, the Mars Habitat Unit has been adopted by NASA as a part of their Mars Design Reference Mission, which uses two Mars Habitat Units – one of which flies to Mars uncrewed, providing a dedicated laboratory facility on Mars, together with the capacity to carry a larger rover vehicle. The second Mars Habitat Unit flies to Mars with the crew, its interior given over completely to living and storage space.

To prove the viability of the Mars Habitat Unit, the Mars Society has implemented the Mars Analogue Research Station Program (MARS), which has established a number of prototype Mars Habitat Units around the world.

== Reception ==
Baker pitched Mars Direct at the Marshall Spaceflight Center in April 1990, where reception was very positive. The engineers flew around the country to present their plan, which generated significant interest. When their tour culminated in a demonstration at the National Space Society they received a standing ovation. The plan gained rapid media attention shortly afterwards.

Resistance to the plan came from teams within NASA working on the Space Station and advanced propulsion concepts. The NASA administration rejected Mars Direct. Zubrin remained committed to the strategy, and after parting with David Baker, attempted to convince the new NASA administration of Mars Direct's merits in 1992.

After being granted a small research fund at Martin Marietta, Zubrin and his colleagues successfully demonstrated an in-situ propellant generator which achieved an efficiency of 94%. No chemical engineers partook in the development of the demonstration hardware. After showing the positive results to the Johnson Space Center, the NASA administration still held several reservations about the plan.

In November 2003, Zubrin was invited to speak to the U.S. Senate committee on the future of space exploration. Two months later, the Bush administration announced the creation of the Constellation program, a human spaceflight initiative with the goal of sending humans to the Moon by 2020. While a Mars mission was not specifically detailed, a plan to reach Mars based on utilizing the Orion spacecraft was tentatively developed for implementation in the 2030s. In 2009 the Obama administration began a review of the Constellation program, and after budgetary concerns, the program was cancelled in 2010.

There are a variety of psychological and sociological issues that could affect long-duration expeditionary space missions. Early human spaceflight missions to Mars are expected by some to have significant psycho-social problems to overcome, as well as provide considerable data for refining mission design, mission planning, and crew selection for future missions.

== Revisions ==
Since Mars Direct was initially conceived, it has undergone regular review and development by Zubrin himself, the Mars Society, NASA, Stanford University and others.

=== Mars Semi-Direct ===
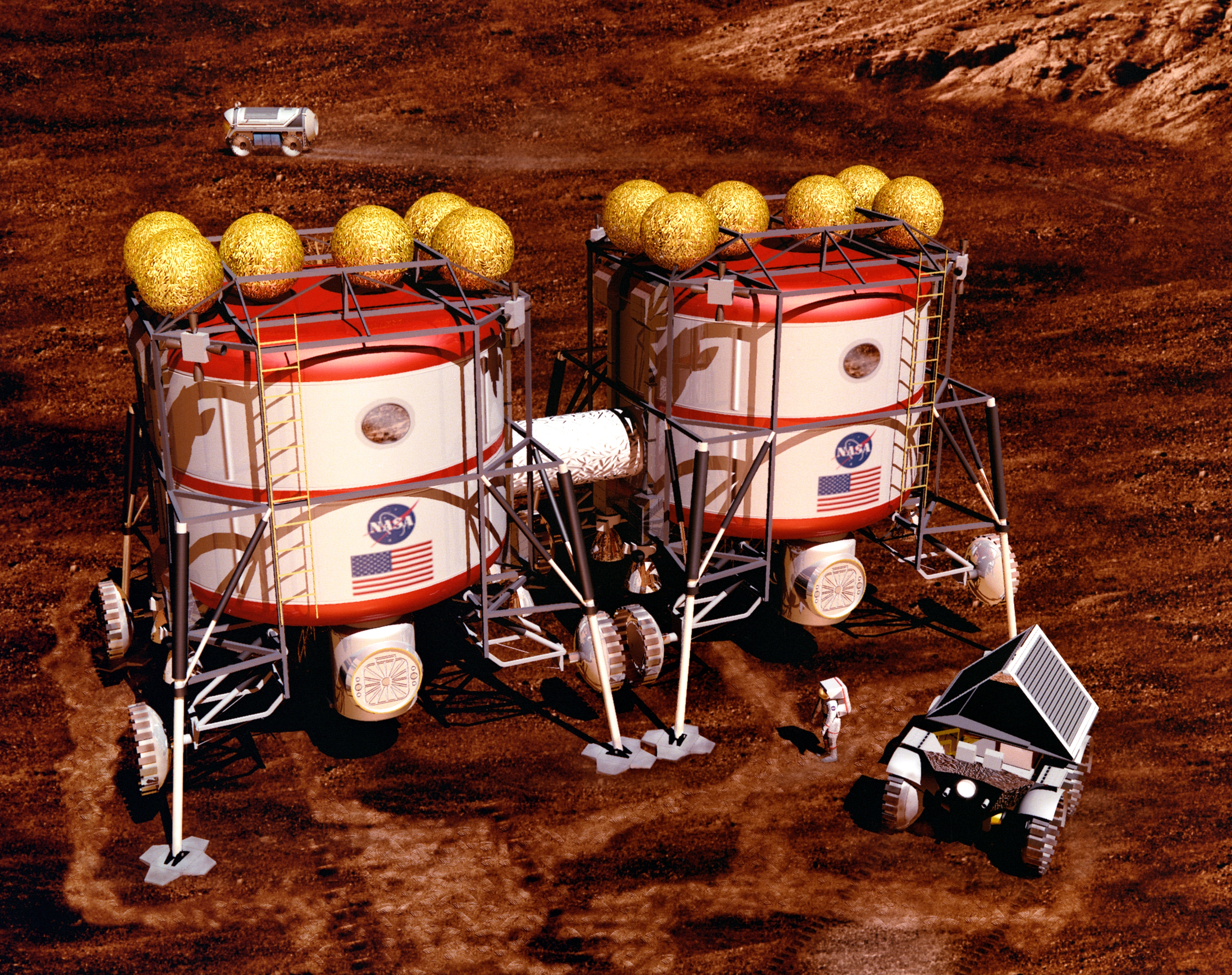
Artist's rendering of Mars Semi-Direct/DRA 1.0: The Manned Habitat Unit is "docked" alongside a pre placed habitat that was sent ahead of the Earth Return Vehicle.

Zubrin and Weaver developed a modified version of Mars Direct, called Mars Semi-Direct, in response to some specific criticisms. This mission consists of three spacecraft and includes a "Mars Ascent Vehicle" (MAV). The ERV remains in Mars orbit for the return journey, while the uncrewed MAV lands and manufactures propellants for the ascent back up to Mars orbit. The Mars Semi-Direct architecture has been used as the basis of a number of studies, including the NASA Design Reference Missions.

When subjected to the same cost-analysis as the 90-day report, Mars Semi-Direct was predicted to cost 55 billion dollars over 10 years, capable of fitting into the existing NASA budget.

Mars Semi-Direct became the basis of the Design Reference Mission 1.0 of NASA, replacing the Space Exploration Initiative.

=== Design Reference Mission ===
The NASA model, referred to as the Design Reference Mission, on version 5.0 as of September 1, 2012, calls for a significant upgrade in hardware (at least three launches per mission, rather than two), and sends the ERV to Mars fully fueled, parking it in orbit above the planet for subsequent rendezvous with the MAV.

=== Mars Direct and SpaceX ===
With the potentially imminent advent of low-cost heavy lift capability, Zubrin has posited a dramatically lower cost human Mars mission using hardware developed by space transport company SpaceX. In this simpler plan, a crew of two would be sent to Mars by a single Falcon Heavy launch, the Dragon spacecraft acting as their interplanetary cruise habitat. Additional living space for the journey would be enabled through the use of inflatable add-on modules if required. The problems associated with long-term weightlessness would be addressed in the same manner as the baseline Mars Direct plan, a tether between the Dragon habitat and the TMI (Trans-Mars Injection) stage acting to allow rotation of the craft.

The Dragon's heatshield characteristics could allow for a safe descent if landing rockets of sufficient power were made available. Research at NASA's Ames Research Center has demonstrated that a robotic Dragon would be capable of a fully propulsive landing on the Martian surface. On the surface, the crew would have at their disposal two Dragon spacecraft with inflatable modules as habitats, two ERVs, two Mars ascent vehicles and 8 tonnes of cargo.

=== Other Studies ===
The Mars Society and Stanford studies retain the original two-vehicle mission profile of Mars Direct, but increase the crew size to six. A study by Donald Barker and AIAA called Solar System Longboats also uses a two-vehicle system and a crew of six, but splits it between a two identical vehicle pairs (each with a crew of three, but capable of carrying all six in an emergency), as well as adding an inflatable living space and a water-based radiation shelter to the ERV.

Mars Society Australia developed their own four-person Mars Oz reference mission, based on Mars Semi-Direct. This study uses horizontally landing, bent biconic shaped modules, and relies on solar power and chemical propulsion throughout, where Mars Direct and the DRMs used nuclear reactors for surface power and, in the case of the DRMs for propulsion as well. The Mars Oz reference mission also differs in assuming, based on space station experience, that spin gravity will not be required.

== Mars Analogue Research Stations ==
The Mars Society has argued the viability of the Mars Habitat Unit concept through their Mars Analogue Research Station program. These are two or three decked vertical cylinders ~8 m in diameter and 8 m high. Mars Society Australia plans to build its own station based on the Mars Oz design. The Mars Oz design features a horizontal cylinder 4.7 m in diameter and 18 m long, with a tapered nose. A second similar module will function as a garage and power and logistics module.

Mars Direct was featured on a Discovery Channel programs Mars: The Next Frontier in which issues were discussed surrounding NASA funding of the project, and on Mars Underground, where the plan is discussed more in-depth.

== Alternatives ==
"Mars to Stay" proposals involve not returning the first immigrant/explorers immediately, or ever. It has been suggested the cost of sending a four or six person team could be one fifth to one tenth the cost of returning that same four or six person team. Depending on the specific approach taken, a quite complete lab could be sent and landed for less than the cost of sending back even 50 kilos of Martian rocks. Twenty or more persons could be sent for the cost of returning four.

== In fiction ==
- Mars Direct is the mission mode used in Gregory Benford's novel The Martian Race, Geoffrey A. Landis's novel Mars Crossing, Larry Niven's novel Rainbow Mars, Robert M. Blevins's novel The 13th Day of Christmas, as well as Zubrin's own novel, First Landing.
- Mars Direct forms the basis for the 2000 film Mission to Mars.
- In the Futurama episode "The Luck of the Fryrish", a short clip shows the first man on Mars with a spacecraft that resembles the Mars Habitat Unit.
- In the West Wing episode "The Warfare of Genghis Khan", a NASA staffer describes Mars Direct to the skeptical White House Deputy Chief of Staff Josh Lyman and is able to convince him of its merit.
- Both Mars Direct and Mars for Less concepts figure prominently in Brian Enke's 2005 novel, Shadows of Medusa.

== See also ==
- Exploration of Mars
- Human mission to Mars – Proposed concepts
- Inspiration Mars – Defunct, proposed a crewed flyby mission
- List of crewed Mars mission plans
- Mars One – Defunct foundation and company that promoted Mars colonization
