= The Case for Mars =

Robert Zubrin book on potential colonization

The Case for Mars: The Plan to Settle the Red Planet and Why We Must
- Author: Robert Zubrin; Richard Wagner
- Language: English
- Subject: Non-fiction; Science
- Publisher: Touchstone
- Publication date: 1996
- Pages: 368
- ISBN: 978-0684835501
- OCLC: 34906203
- Dewey Decimal: 919.9/2304-dc20
- LC Class: QB641.Z83 1996

The Case for Mars: The Plan to Settle the Red Planet and Why We Must is a nonfiction science book by Robert Zubrin, first published in 1996, and revised and updated in 2011.

The book details Zubrin's Mars Direct plan to make the first human landing on Mars. The plan focuses on keeping costs down by making use of automated systems and available materials on Mars to manufacture the return journey's fuel in situ. The book also reveals possible Mars colony designs and weighs the prospects for a colony's material self-sufficiency and for the terraforming of Mars.

== Mars Direct ==
The Mars Direct plan was originally detailed by Zubrin and David Baker in 1990. The Case for Mars is, according to Zubrin, a comprehensive condensation for laymen of many years' work and research. Chapters 1 and 4 deal primarily with Mars Direct.

== Colonization ==
For Robert Zubrin, the attractiveness of Mars Direct does not rest on a single cost-effective mission. He envisions a series of regular Martian missions with the ultimate goal of colonization, which he details in the seventh through ninth chapters. As initial explorers leave hab-structures on the planet, subsequent missions become easier to undertake.

Large mall-like structures buried in regolith, pressurized habitats would be the first step toward human settlement; the book suggests they can be built as Roman-style atria on the surface and then be buried with regolith, with easily produced Martian brick. During and after this initial phase of habitat construction, hard-plastic radiation- and abrasion-resistant geodesic domes could be deployed on the surface for eventual habitation and crop growth. Nascent industry would begin using indigenous resources: the manufacture of plastics, ceramics and glass.

The larger work of terraforming requires an initial phase of global warming to release atmosphere from the regolith and to create a water cycle. Three methods of global warming are described in the work and, Zubrin suggests, are probably best deployed in tandem: orbital mirrors to heat the surface; factories on the surface to pump halocarbons such as perfluromethane into the atmosphere; and the seeding of bacteria which can metabolize water, nitrogen and carbon to produce ammonia and methane (these would aid in global warming). While the work of warming Mars is on-going, true colonization can begin.

The Case for Mars acknowledges that any Martian colony will be partially Earth-dependent for centuries. However, it suggests that Mars may be a profitable place for two reasons. First, it may contain concentrated supplies of metals of equal or greater value to silver which have not been subjected to millennia of human scavenging and may be sold on Earth for profit. Secondly, the concentration of deuterium – a possible fuel for commercial nuclear fusion – is five times greater on Mars. Humans emigrating to Mars thus have an assured industry and the planet will be a magnet for settlers as wage costs will be high. The book asserts that “the labor shortage that will prevail on Mars will drive Martian civilization toward both technological and social advances.”

== Wider considerations ==
While detailing the exploration and colonization, The Case for Mars also addresses a number of attendant scientific and political factors.

=== Risks confronted ===
The fifth chapter analyzes various risks that putatively rule out a long-term human presence on Mars. Zubrin dismisses the idea that radiation and zero-gravity are unduly hazardous. He claims that cancer rates do increase for astronauts who have spent extensive time in space, but only marginally. Similarly, while zero-gravity presents challenges, “near total recovery of musculature and immune system occurs after reentry and reconditioning to a one-gravity environment.” Furthermore, since his plan has the spacecraft spinning at the end of a long tether to create artificial gravity, worries about zero gravity do not apply to this mission in any case. Back-contamination – humans acquiring and spreading Martian viruses – is described as "just plain nuts", because there are no host organisms on Mars for disease organisms to have evolved.

In the same chapter, Zubrin decisively denounces and rejects suggestions that the Moon should be used as waypoint to Mars or as a training area. It is ultimately much easier to journey to Mars from low Earth orbit than from the Moon and using the latter as a staging point is a pointless diversion of resources. While the Moon may superficially appear a good place to perfect Mars exploration and habitation techniques, the two bodies are radically different. The Moon has no atmosphere, no analogous geology and a much greater temperature range and rotational period. Antarctica or desert areas of Earth provide much better training grounds at lesser cost.

=== Viability ===
In the third and tenth chapters, The Case for Mars addresses the politics and costs of the ideas described. The authors argue that the colonization of Mars is a logical extension of the settlement of North America. They envision a frontier society, providing opportunities for innovation and social experimentation.

Zubrin suggests three models to provide the will and capital to drive Mars exploration forward: the J.F.K. model, in which a far-sighted U.S. leader provides the funding and mobilizes national public opinion around the idea; the Sagan model, in which international co-operation is the driving force; and the Gingrich approach, which emphasizes incentives and even prizes for private sector actors who take on research and development tasks. In keeping with the third idea, Zubrin describes twelve challenges that address various aspects of the exploration program. A monetary prize – from five hundred million to twenty billion dollars – is offered to companies who successfully complete the challenges.

The prize-based approach to hardware development has emerged within the private aeronautics community, though not yet on the scale envisioned by Zubrin. Ventures such as the Ansari X-Prize and Robert Bigelow's America's Space Prize seek low-cost spaceflight development through private enterprise, and crucially, for the attainment of very specific predetermined goals in order to win the prizes.

The underlying political and economic problems of raising sufficient capital for terraforming using halocarbon emissions has been critiqued by John Hickman.

== Translations ==
In 1997, a Polish translation of the book was published under the title Czas Marsa: dlaczego i w jaki sposób musimy skolonizować Czerwoną Planetę (The age of Mars: why and how must we colonize the Red Planet) (ISBN 8371800371).

In 2017, a Russian translation of the book was published under the title of Курс на Марс (On Course for Mars) (ISBN 978-5-699-75295-9).

== See also ==
- Mars Society – Advocacy group for Mars exploration
- Colonization of Mars
- Human mission to Mars – Proposed concepts
- Mars exploration
- Mars One – Defunct foundation and company that promoted Mars colonization
- Mars to Stay – Mars colonization architecture proposing no return vehicles
- Inspiration Mars – Defunct, proposed a crewed flyby mission
- List of crewed Mars mission plans
- The Millennial Project by space advocate Marshall Savage
- Mining the Sky by space advocate John S. Lewis
- Engines of Creation by nanotechnologist and space advocate K. Eric Drexler
- The High Frontier: Human Colonies in Space by space advocate Gerard O'Neill
