= Mars Design Reference Mission =

Conceptual design studies for crewed missions to Mars

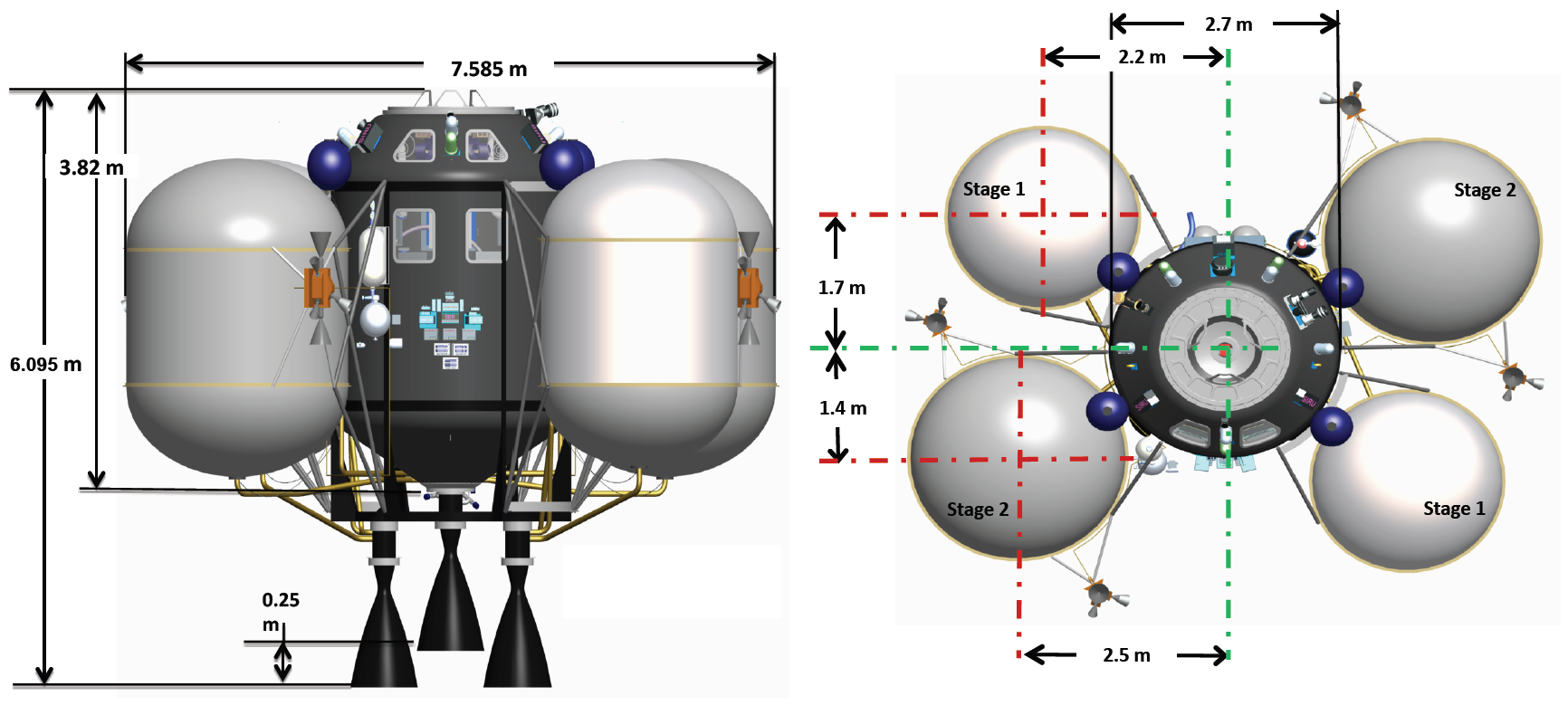
Mars Ascent Vehicle for six people from DRA5

The NASA Mars Design Reference Mission ("DRM") refer to a series of NASA conceptual design studies of the missions to send humans to Mars. The related term, Design Reference Architecture (DRA), refers to the entire sequences of missions and supporting infrastructure.

These are reference baseline studies summarizing the current technology and possible approaches for a human mission to Mars, and are not actual mission programs. According to NASA, the documents "represent a 'snapshot' of work in progress in support of planning for future human exploration of the Martian surface." The design reference missions are used for technology trade studies, to analyze the effect of different approaches to the mission.

== Reference Design Mission (1993) ==
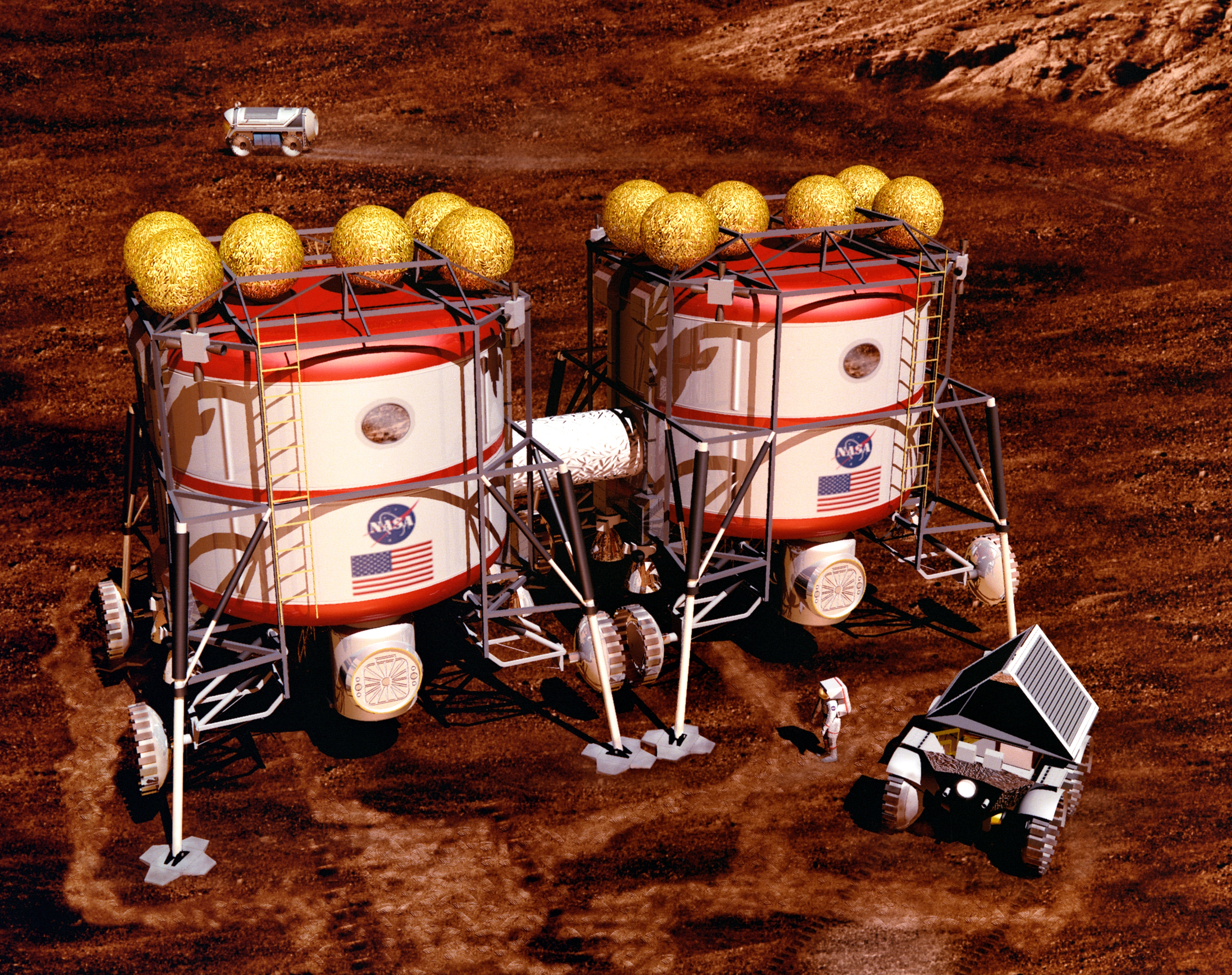
Artist concept of a Mars habitat, 1993

The first Mars Design Reference Mission was a NASA study completed in May 1993, under the auspices of the Space Exploration Initiative (SEI). The objective was to develop a "Reference Mission" based on previous studies and data, where the Reference Mission serves as a basis for comparing different approaches and criteria from future studies.

The study was based on Robert Zubrin's Mars Direct mission design. Thus dubbed Mars Semi-Direct by Zubrin, it also made several significant changes, for instance accounting for a larger crew and a dedicated Mars Ascent Vehicle that was to do an Apollo-style Mars-orbit rendezvous with the Earth Return Vehicle, which was to remain in orbit. The Design Reference Mission replaced the preceding SEI as the standing mission plan.

=== Approach and results ===
- Limit the time that the crew is exposed to the harsh space environment by employing fast transits to and from Mars and abort to the surface strategy
- Use local resources to reduce mission mass
- Use split-mission strategy to pre-deploy mission hardware to reduce mass and minimize risk to the crew
- Examine three human missions to Mars beginning in 2009
- Use advanced space propulsion (e.g., nuclear thermal propulsion) for in-space transportation
- Send payloads directly to Mars using a large launch vehicle (200+ t to low Earth orbit)
- Use nuclear surface power for robust continuous power

The conclusions of the study were that the total mission mass was approximately 900 metric tons for the first crew (3 cargo vehicles, 1 piloted vehicle). The study pointed out that development of the large launch vehicle is a long-lead and expensive system, and approaches using smaller launch vehicles should be investigated.

== Design Reference Mission 2.0 ==
In 1997, a NASA Mars Exploration Study Team was put together and made a more detailed version of the original design reference mission. The plan describes the first human missions to Mars with concept of operations and technologies to be used as a first cut at an architecture. According to the report:

Personnel representing several NASA field centers have formulated a "Reference Mission" addressing human exploration of Mars. This report summarizes their work and describes a plan for the first human missions to Mars, using approaches that are technically feasible, have reasonable risks, and have relatively low costs. The architecture for the Mars Reference Mission builds on previous work of the Synthesis Group (1991) and Zubrin's (1991) concepts for the use of propellants derived from the Martian Atmosphere. In defining the Reference Mission, choices have been made. In this report, the rationale for each choice is documented; however, unanticipated technology advances or political decisions might change the choices in the future.

According to Portree "Subsequent DRM evolution focused on minimizing spacecraft weight in an effort to reduce estimated mission cost." Although not officially given a designation "2.0", the 1997 "scrubbed" (that is, mass reduced) version is referred to by the designation 2.0 in later documents.

== Design Reference Mission 3.0 ==
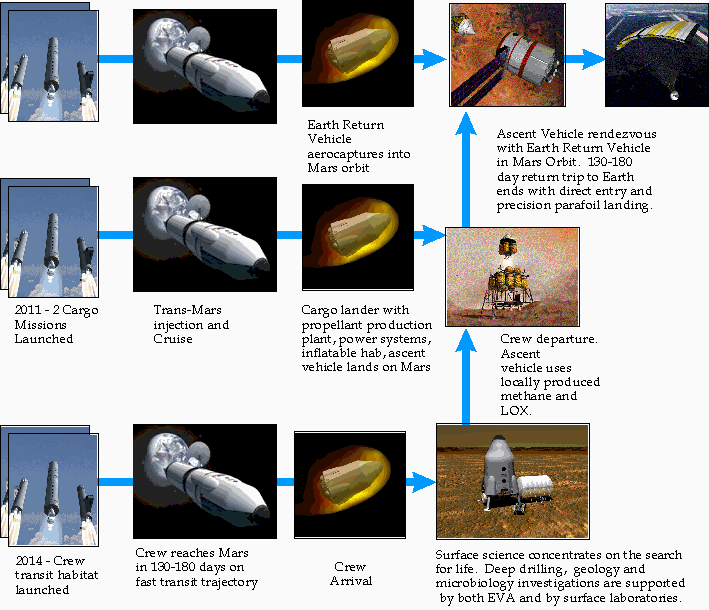
Design Reference Mission 3.0

Design Reference Mission 3.0 was a continuation of the 1997 study performed by the NASA Mars Exploration Team, with the report published in June 1998 as an addendum to the 1997 study. The stated purpose of the Reference Mission was to stimulate further thought and development of alternative approaches: "It is intended to identify and clarify system "drivers", or significant sources of cost, performance, risk, and schedule variation. It does not represent a final or recommended approach to human Mars missions. Several alternative scenarios, including human exploration missions to the Moon, Asteroids, or other targets beyond Earth orbit as well as employing different technical approaches to solving mission and technology challenges, are currently under study by the Exploration Team. Comparing alternative approaches provides the basis for continual improvement to technology investment plans and general understanding of future human exploration missions. The Addendum represents a "snapshot" of work in progress in support of planning for future human exploration missions through May 1998.

The report of the Reference Mission Version 3.0 states:

From the work of the original Reference Mission (Version 1.0), the strategy for the human exploration of Mars has evolved from its original form to one of reduced system mass, use of a smaller, more reasonable launch vehicle, and use of more current technology. The steps which have been taken by the Exploration Team are motivated by the need to reduce the mass of the payload delivery flights, as well as the overall mission cost, without introducing additional mission risk. By eliminating the need for a large heavy-lift launch vehicle and deleting the redundant habitat delivery flight in Version 3.0, two launches from the Earth were eliminated. The net result is a current Version 3.0 Reference Mission which requires an injected mass of approximately one-half that of the 1993/94 Reference Mission."

== Design Reference Mission 4.0 ==
The objective of Design Reference Mission 4 in 1998 was to refine DRM 3.0 to improve identified weaknesses, provide further refinement of systems design and concepts, and improve risk abatement strategy.

DRM 4.0 examined both nuclear thermal propulsion and solar electric propulsion variants of the Mars transportation system.

=== Principal results ===
Principal results of the study were

- Incorporation of a round-trip crew transfer vehicle reduces system reliability requirement from five to three years, but requires an additional rendezvous in Mars orbit
- End-to-end solar electric propulsion vehicle mission concept is shown to be a viable concept, but vehicle packaging and size remain tall-poles
- Total mission mass estimates:
  - Solar electric propulsion: 467 tonnes
  - Nuclear thermal propulsion: 436 tonnes
  - Chemical with aerobraking: 657 tonnes (similar but not identical mission concept)

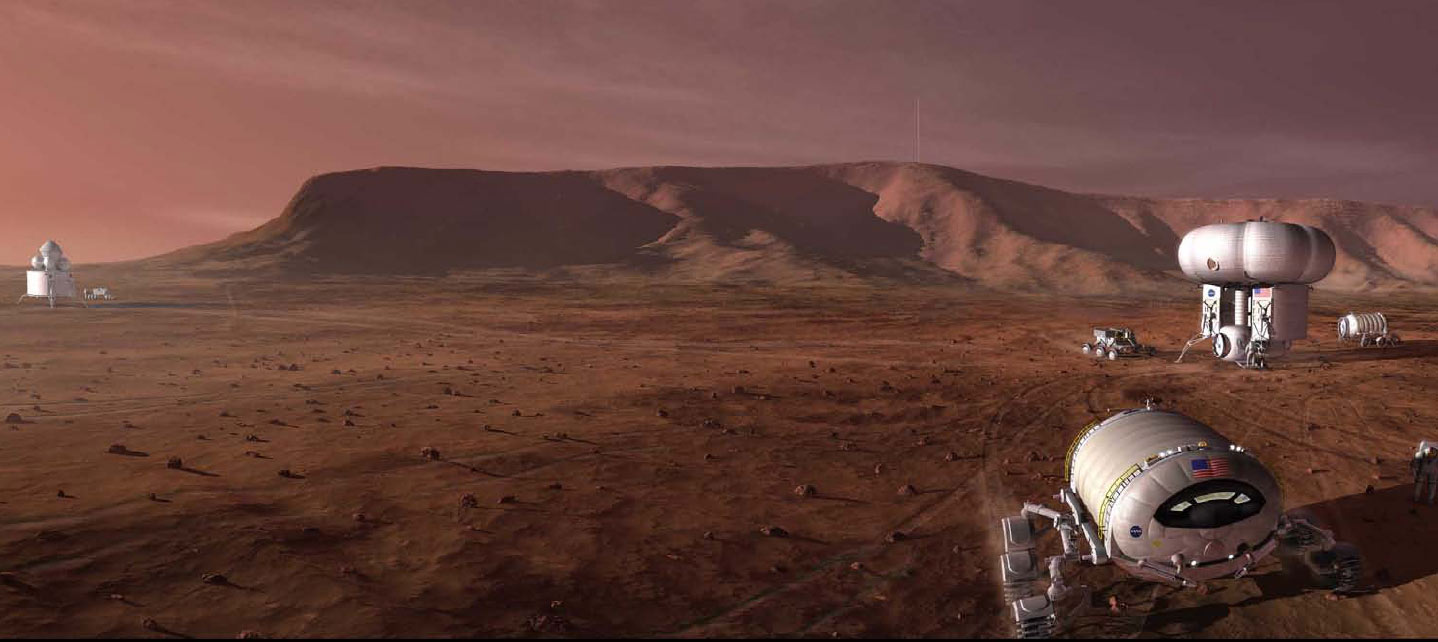
Concept for NASA Design Reference Mission Architecture 5.0 (2009)

== Design Reference Architecture 5.0 ==
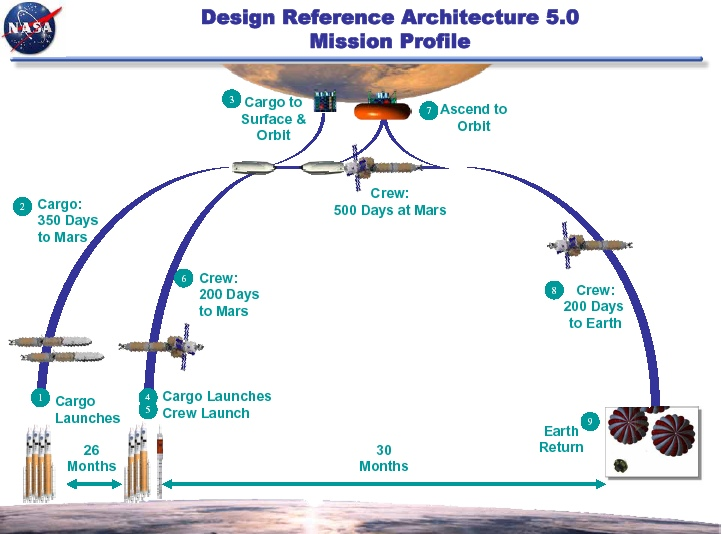
Diagram of some Earth and Mars mission designs

NASA Design Reference Mission 5.0 was done in 2009 with an addendum in July 2009, and a second addendum in March 2014.

There is also a version of DRA5 called Austere Human Missions to Mars, produced in 2009 that has a reduced amount of hardware and number of goals.

As of 2024, 5.0 is the most recent version of the Design Reference mission.

== See also ==
- List of crewed Mars mission plans
- Mars sample return mission – Mars mission to collect rock and dust samples
