= Terraforming of Mars =

Hypothetical modification of Mars into an Earth-like habitable planet

An artist's conception of the process of terraforming Mars.

The terraforming of Mars is a hypothetical procedure that would consist of a planetary engineering project or concurrent projects aspiring to transform Mars from a planet hostile to life to one that could sustainably host humans and other lifeforms free of protection or mediation. The process would involve the modification of the planet's extant climate, atmosphere, and surface through a variety of resource-intensive initiatives, as well as the installation of a novel ecological system or systems.

Justifications for choosing Mars over other potential terraforming targets include the presence of water and a geological history that suggests it once harbored a dense atmosphere similar to Earth's. Hazards and difficulties include low gravity, toxic soil, low light levels relative to Earth's, and the lack of a magnetic field.

Although new techniques have emerged that could raise Mars's average global temperature by tens of degrees within a few decades, the terraforming of Mars is considered to be infeasible using present-day technology. Disagreement exists about whether future technology should render the planet habitable. Reasons for supporting terraforming the planet include allaying concerns about resource consumption and depletion on Earth and arguments that the alteration and settlement of other planets decreases the odds of humanity's extinction. Reasons for objecting to terraforming the planet include ethical concerns about terraforming, and the considerable energy and resource costs that such an undertaking would involve.

== Motivation and side effects ==
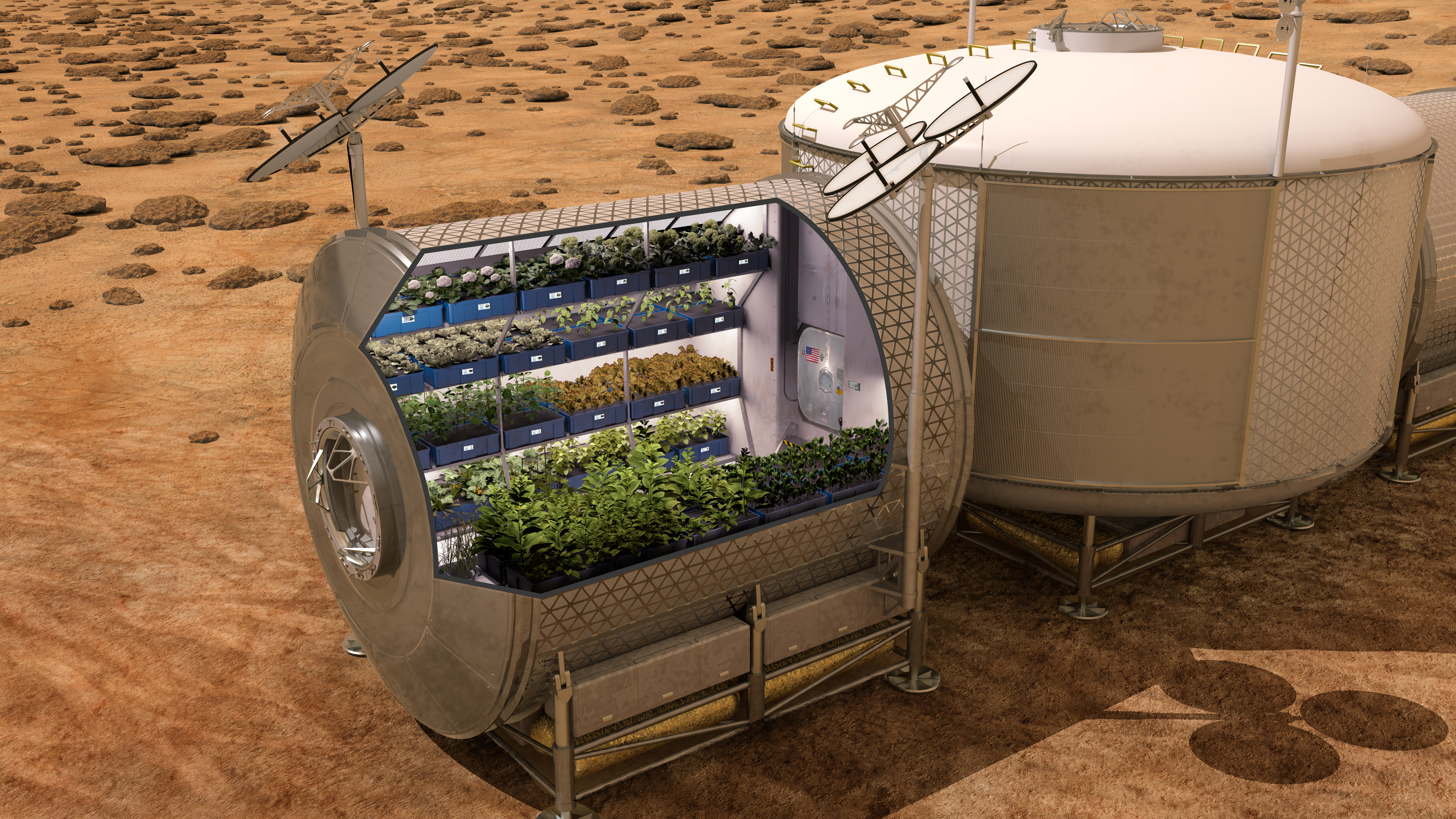
An illustration of plants growing in a hypothetical Mars base.

Future population growth, demand for resources, and an alternate solution to the doomsday argument may require human colonization of bodies other than Earth, such as Mars, the Moon, and other objects. Space colonization would facilitate harvesting the Solar System's energy and material resources.

In many aspects, Mars is the most Earth-like of all the other planets in the Solar System. It is thought that Mars had a more Earth-like environment early in its geological history, with a thicker atmosphere and abundant water that was lost over the course of hundreds of millions of years through atmospheric escape. Given the foundations of similarity and proximity, Mars would make one of the most plausible terraforming targets in the Solar System.

Research on terraforming Mars continues to advance. Mars, once terraformed, could become humanity's last hope in the event of various catastrophes, such as an unlimited nuclear war that could result in high radioactive contamination of the Earth, uncontrolled global warming, or an epidemic of particularly virulent bacteria or viruses.

Side effects of some methods of terraforming include the potential displacement or destruction of any indigenous life if such life exists.

== Challenges and limitations ==
This diagram shows the change in the atmosphere escaping from Mars if it was close to the average temperature on Earth. Mars is thought to have been warm in the past, due to evidence of liquid water on the surface, and terraforming would make it warm again. At these temperatures oxygen and nitrogen would escape into space much faster than they do today.

The Martian environment presents several terraforming challenges to overcome and the extent of terraforming may be limited by certain key environmental factors. The process of terraforming aims to mitigate the following distinctions between Mars and Earth, among others:

- Reduced light levels (about 60% of Earth)
- Low surface gravity (38% of Earth's)
- Unbreathable atmosphere
- Low atmospheric pressure (about 1% of Earth's; well below the Armstrong limit)
- Ionizing solar and cosmic radiation at the surface
- Average temperature −63 °C (210 K; −81 °F) compared to Earth average of 14 °C (287 K; 57 °F)
- Molecular instability — bonds between atoms break down in critical molecules such as organic compounds
- Global dust storms
- No natural food source
- Toxic soil
- No global magnetic field to shield against the solar wind

=== Countering the effects of space weather ===
Mars has no intrinsic global magnetic field, but the solar wind directly interacts with the atmosphere of Mars, leading to the formation of a magnetosphere from magnetic field tubes. This poses challenges for mitigating solar radiation and retaining an atmosphere.

The lack of a magnetic field, its relatively small mass, and its atmospheric photochemistry, all would have contributed to the evaporation and loss of its surface liquid water over time. Solar wind–induced ejection of Martian atmospheric atoms has been detected by Mars-orbiting probes, indicating that the solar wind has stripped the Martian atmosphere over time. The current loss rate of CO_{2} from Mars's atmosphere to space is equivalent to approximately 1 millibar per billion years.

For comparison, while Venus has a dense atmosphere, it has only traces of water vapor (20 ppm) as it lacks a large, dipole-induced, magnetic field. Earth's ozone layer provides additional protection. Ultraviolet light is blocked before it can dissociate water into hydrogen and oxygen.

=== Low gravity and pressure ===
The surface gravity on Mars is 38% of that on Earth. It is not known if this is enough to prevent the health problems associated with weightlessness.

Mars's CO_{2} atmosphere has about 1% the pressure of the Earth's at sea level. It is estimated that there is sufficient CO_{2} ice in the regolith and the south polar cap to form a 30 to 60 kilopascals [kPa] (4.4 to 8.7 psi) atmosphere if it is released by planetary warming. The reappearance of liquid water on the Martian surface would add to the warming effects and atmospheric density, but the lower gravity of Mars requires 2.6 times Earth's column airmass to obtain the optimum 100 kPa (15 psi) pressure at the surface. Additional volatiles to increase the atmosphere's density must be supplied from an external source, such as redirecting several massive asteroids (40–400 billion tonnes total) containing ammonia (NH_{3}) as a source of nitrogen.

=== Breathing on Mars ===
Current conditions in the Martian atmosphere, at less than 1 kPa (0.15 psi) of atmospheric pressure, are significantly below the Armstrong limit of 6 kPa (0.87 psi) where very low pressure causes exposed bodily liquids such as saliva, tears, and the liquids wetting the alveoli within the lungs to boil away. Without a pressure suit, no amount of breathable oxygen delivered by any means will sustain oxygen-breathing life for more than a few minutes. In the NASA technical report Rapid (Explosive) Decompression Emergencies in Pressure-Suited Subjects, after exposure to pressure below the Armstrong limit, a survivor reported that his "last conscious memory was of the water on his tongue beginning to boil". In these conditions humans die within minutes unless a pressure suit provides life support.

If Mars's atmospheric pressure could rise above 19 kPa (2.8 psi), then a pressure suit would not be required. Visitors would only need to wear a mask that supplied 100% oxygen under positive pressure. A further increase to 24 kPa (3.5 psi) of atmospheric pressure would allow a simple mask supplying pure oxygen. This might look similar to mountain climbers who venture into pressures below 37 kPa (5.4 psi), also called the death zone, where an insufficient amount of bottled oxygen has often resulted in hypoxia with fatalities. If the increase in atmospheric pressure was achieved by increasing CO_{2}, or other toxic gas, the mask would have to ensure the external atmosphere did not enter the breathing apparatus. CO_{2} concentrations as low as 1% cause drowsiness in humans. Concentrations of 7% to 10% may cause suffocation, even in the presence of sufficient oxygen. (See Carbon dioxide toxicity.)

In 2021, the NASA Mars rover Perseverance was able to make oxygen on Mars. The process is complex and takes a considerable amount of time to produce a small amount of oxygen. considered various methods of raising Mars' temperature without replenishing the atmosphere with nitrogen. It would then be possible to create a thin atmosphere composed primarily of oxygen, but still capable of supporting human life.

== Advantages ==
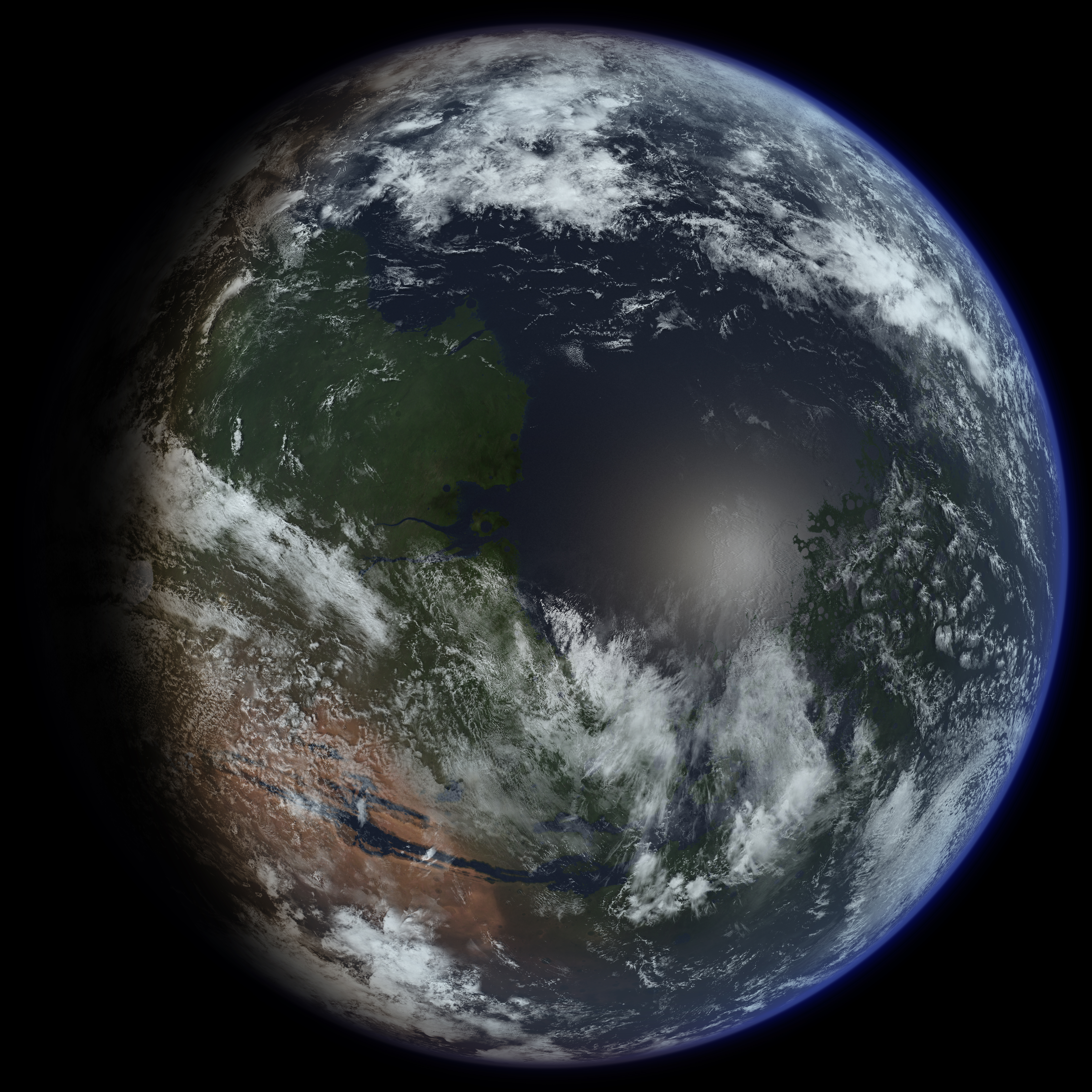
A hypothetical terraformed Mars

Mars exists on the outer edge of the habitable zone, a region of the Solar System where liquid water on the surface may be supported if concentrated greenhouse gases could increase the atmospheric pressure. The lack of both a magnetic field and geologic activity on Mars may be a result of its relatively small size, which allowed the interior to cool more quickly than Earth's, although the details of such a process are still not well understood.

There are strong indications that Mars once had an atmosphere as thick as Earth's during an earlier stage in its development, and that its pressure supported abundant liquid water at the surface. Although water appears to have once been present on the Martian surface, ground ice currently exists from mid-latitudes to the poles. The soil and atmosphere of Mars contain many of the main elements crucial to life, including sulfur, nitrogen, hydrogen, oxygen, phosphorus and carbon.

Any climate change induced in the near term is likely to be driven by greenhouse warming produced by an increase in atmospheric carbon dioxide (CO_{2}) and a consequent increase in atmospheric water vapor. These two gases are the only likely sources of greenhouse warming that are available in large quantities in Mars's environment. Large amounts of water ice exist below the Martian surface, and on the surface at the poles, where it is mixed with dry ice, frozen CO_{2}. Significant amounts of water are located at the south pole of Mars, which, if melted, would correspond to a planetwide ocean 5–11 meters deep.

Frozen carbon dioxide (CO_{2}) at the poles sublimes into the atmosphere during the Martian summers, and small amounts of water residue are left behind, which fast winds sweep off the poles at speeds approaching 400 km/h (250 mph). This seasonal occurrence transports large amounts of dust and water ice into the atmosphere, forming Earth-like ice clouds.

Most of the oxygen in the Martian atmosphere is present as carbon dioxide (CO_{2}), the main atmospheric component. Molecular oxygen (O_{2}) only exists in trace amounts. Large amounts of oxygen can be also found in metal oxides on the Martian surface, and in the soil, in the form of per-nitrates. An analysis of soil samples taken by the Phoenix lander indicated the presence of perchlorate, which has been used to liberate oxygen in chemical oxygen generators. Electrolysis could be employed to separate water on Mars into oxygen and hydrogen if sufficient liquid water and electricity were available. However, if vented into the atmosphere it would escape into space.

== Proposed methods and strategies ==
Comparison of dry atmosphere
Atmospheric property	Mars	Earth
Pressure	0.61 kPa (0.088 psi)	101.3 kPa (14.69 psi)
Carbon dioxide (CO_{2})	96.0%	0.04%
Argon (Ar)	2.1%	0.93%
Nitrogen (N_{2})	1.9%	78.08%
Oxygen (O_{2})	0.145%	20.94%

Terraforming Mars would entail three major interlaced changes: building up the magnetosphere, building up the atmosphere, and raising the temperature. The atmosphere of Mars is relatively thin and has a very low surface pressure. Because its atmosphere consists mainly of CO_{2}, a known greenhouse gas, once Mars begins to heat, the CO_{2} may help to keep thermal energy near the surface. As it heats, more CO_{2} should enter the atmosphere from the frozen reserves on the poles, enhancing the greenhouse effect. This means that the two processes of building the atmosphere and heating it would augment each other, favoring terraforming. However, it would be difficult to keep the atmosphere together because of the lack of a protective global magnetic field against erosion by the solar wind.

=== Importing ammonia ===
One method of augmenting the Martian atmosphere is to introduce ammonia (NH_{3}). Large amounts of ammonia are likely to exist in frozen form on minor planets orbiting in the outer Solar System. It might be possible to redirect the orbits of these or smaller ammonia-rich objects so that they collide with Mars, thereby transferring the ammonia into the Martian atmosphere. Ammonia is not stable in the Martian atmosphere. It breaks down into (diatomic) nitrogen and hydrogen after a few hours.

Thus, though ammonia is a powerful greenhouse gas, it is unlikely to generate much planetary warming. was the first to demonstrate a realistic method of replenishing the Martian atmosphere with the missing components (primarily nitrogen). The required mass (about 10^{19} kg of bodies from the Kuiper Belt) could be brought to Mars using thermonuclear propulsion (based on a fusion reactor) and gravity assist.

=== Importing hydrocarbons ===
Another way to create a Martian atmosphere would be to import methane (CH_{4}) or other hydrocarbons, which are common in Titan's atmosphere and on its surface. The methane could be vented into the atmosphere where it would act to compound the greenhouse effect. Like ammonia (NH_{3}), methane (CH_{4}) is a relatively light gas. It is even less dense than ammonia and so would similarly be lost into space if it was introduced, and at a faster rate than ammonia. Even if a method could be found to prevent it escaping into space, methane can exist in the Martian atmosphere for only a limited period before it is destroyed. Estimates of its lifetime range from 0.6–4 years.

=== Use of fluorine compounds ===
Especially powerful greenhouse gases, such as sulfur hexafluoride, chlorofluorocarbons (CFCs), or perfluorocarbons (PFCs), have been suggested both as a means of initially warming Mars and of maintaining long-term climate stability. These gases are proposed for introduction because they generate a greenhouse effect thousands of times stronger than that of CO_{2}. Fluorine-based compounds such as sulphur hexafluoride and perfluorocarbons are preferable to chlorine-based ones as the latter destroys ozone. It has been estimated that approximately 0.3 microbars of CFCs would need to be introduced into Mars's atmosphere to sublimate the south polar CO_{2} glaciers.

This is equivalent to a mass of approximately 39 million tonnes, that is, about three times the amount of CFCs manufactured on Earth from 1972 to 1992, when CFC production was banned by international treaty. Maintaining the temperature would require continual production of such compounds as they are destroyed due to photolysis. It has been estimated that introducing 170 kilotons of optimal greenhouse compounds (CF_{3}CF_{2}CF_{3}, CF_{3}SCF_{2}CF_{3}, SF_{6}, SF_{5}CF_{3}, SF_{4}(CF_{3})_{2}) annually would be sufficient to maintain a 70-K greenhouse effect given a terraformed atmosphere with earth-like pressure and composition.

Typical proposals envision producing the gases on Mars using locally extracted materials, nuclear power, and a significant industrial effort. The potential for mining fluorine-containing minerals to obtain the raw material necessary for the production of CFCs and PFCs is supported by mineralogical surveys of Mars, that estimate the elemental presence of fluorine in the bulk composition of Mars at 32 ppm by mass, as compared to 19.4 ppm for the Earth.

Alternatively, CFCs might be introduced by sending rockets with payloads of compressed CFCs on collision courses with Mars. When the rockets crashed into the surface they would release their payloads into the atmosphere. A steady barrage of these "CFC rockets" would need to be sustained for a little over a decade while Mars is changed chemically and becomes warmer.

=== Use of engineered aerosol ===
A 2024 study proposed using nanorods consisting of a conductive material, such as aluminum or iron, made by processing Martian minerals. These nanorods would scatter and absorb the thermal infrared upwelling from the surface, warming the planet. This process is claimed to be over 5,000 times more effective, in terms of warming per unit mass, than warming using fluorine compounds. A 2026 follow-up modeling study reported that Mars radiative-dynamical feedbacks support engineered-aerosol warming, and suggested Mars-warming particles that are more than 10,000 times more effective (per unit mass) than warming using fluorine compounds.

=== Use of orbital mirrors ===
Mirrors made of thin aluminized PET film could be placed in orbit around Mars to increase the total insolation it receives. This would direct the sunlight onto the surface and could increase Mars's surface temperature directly. The 125 km radius mirror could be positioned as a statite, using its effectiveness as a solar sail to orbit in a stationary position relative to Mars, near the poles, to sublimate the CO_{2} ice sheet and contribute to the warming greenhouse effect. However, certain problems have been found with this. The main concern is the difficulty of launching large mirrors from Earth. It has been proposed that small solar sails launched into a 1,000 km sun synchronous Earth orbit could self-navigate to Mars.

=== Use of nuclear weapons ===
It has been proposed that terraforming Mars could be achieved by detonating nuclear weapons on the Martian polar ice caps to vaporize them and release carbon dioxide and water vapor into the atmosphere. Carbon dioxide and water vapor are greenhouse gases, and the resultant thicker atmosphere would trap heat from the Sun, increasing the planet's temperature. The formation of liquid water could be very favorable for oxygen-producing plants, and thus, human survival.

Studies suggest that even if all the CO_{2} trapped in Mars's polar ice and regolith were released, it would not be enough to provide significant greenhouse warming to turn Mars into an Earth-like planet. Another criticism is that it would stir up enough dust and particles to block out a significant portion of the incoming sunlight, causing a nuclear winter, the opposite of the goal.

=== Albedo reduction ===
Reducing the albedo of the Martian surface would also make more efficient use of incoming sunlight in terms of heat absorption. This could be done by spreading dark dust from Mars's moons, Phobos and Deimos, which are among the blackest bodies in the Solar System; or by introducing dark extremophile microbial life forms such as lichens, algae and bacteria. The ground would then absorb more sunlight, warming the atmosphere. However, Mars is already the second-darkest planet in the solar system, absorbing over 70% of incoming sunlight, so the scope for darkening it further is small.

If algae or other green life were established, it would also contribute a small amount of oxygen to the atmosphere, though not enough to allow humans to breathe. The conversion process to produce oxygen is highly reliant upon water, without which the CO_{2} is mostly converted to carbohydrates. Because on Mars atmospheric oxygen is lost into space, unless an artificial magnetosphere were to be created; see "Protecting the atmosphere" below, such life would need to be cultivated inside a closed system.

In April 2012, scientists reported that lichen survived and showed remarkable results on the adaptation capacity of photosynthetic activity within the simulation time of 34 days under Martian conditions in the Mars Simulation Laboratory (MSL) maintained by the German Aerospace Center (DLR).

One final issue with albedo reduction is the common Martian dust storms. These cover the entire planet for weeks, and increase the albedo and block sunlight from reaching the surface. This has been observed to cause a surface temperature drop which the planet takes months to recover from. Once the dust settles it then covers whatever it lands on, effectively erasing the albedo reduction material from the view of the Sun.

=== Funded research: ecopoiesis ===
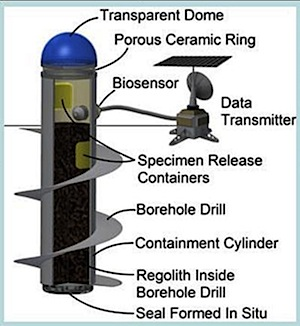
The Mars Ecopoiesis Test Bed showing its transparent dome to allow for solar heat and photosynthesis, and the cork-screw system to collect and seal Martian soil together with oxygen-producing Earth organisms. Total length is about 7 centimetres (2.8 in).

Since 2014, the NASA Institute for Advanced Concepts (NIAC) program and Techshot Inc have been working together to develop sealed biodomes that would employ colonies of oxygen-producing cyanobacteria and algae for the production of molecular oxygen (O_{2}) on Martian soil. First they need to test if it works on a small scale on Mars. The proposal is called Mars Ecopoiesis Test Bed. Eugene Boland is the Chief Scientist at Techshot, a company located in Greenville, Indiana.

They intend to send small canisters of extremophile photosynthetic algae and cyanobacteria aboard a future rover mission. The rover would cork-screw the 7 cm (2.8 in) canisters into selected sites likely to experience transients of liquid water, drawing some Martian soil and then release oxygen-producing microorganisms to grow within the sealed soil. The hardware would use Martian subsurface ice as its phase changes into liquid water. The system would then look for oxygen given off as metabolic byproduct and report results to a Mars-orbiting relay satellite.

If this experiment works on Mars, they will propose to build several large and sealed structures called biodomes, to produce and harvest oxygen for a future human mission to Mars life support systems. Being able to create oxygen there would provide considerable cost-savings to NASA and allow for longer human visits to Mars than would be possible if astronauts have to transport their own heavy oxygen tanks. This biological process, called ecopoiesis, would be isolated, in contained areas, and is not meant as a type of global planetary engineering for terraforming of Mars's atmosphere, but NASA states that "This will be the first major leap from laboratory studies into the implementation of experimental (as opposed to analytical) planetary in situ research of greatest interest to planetary biology, ecopoiesis, and terraforming."

Research at the University of Arkansas presented in June 2015 suggested that some methanogens could survive in Mars's low pressure. Rebecca Mickol found that in her laboratory, four species of methanogens survived low-pressure conditions that were similar to a subsurface liquid aquifer on Mars. The four species that she tested were Methanothermobacter wolfeii, Methanosarcina barkeri, Methanobacterium formicicum, and Methanococcus maripaludis. Methanogens do not require oxygen or organic nutrients, are non-photosynthetic, use hydrogen as their energy source and carbon dioxide (CO_{2}) as their carbon source, so they could exist in subsurface environments on Mars.

=== Protecting the atmosphere ===
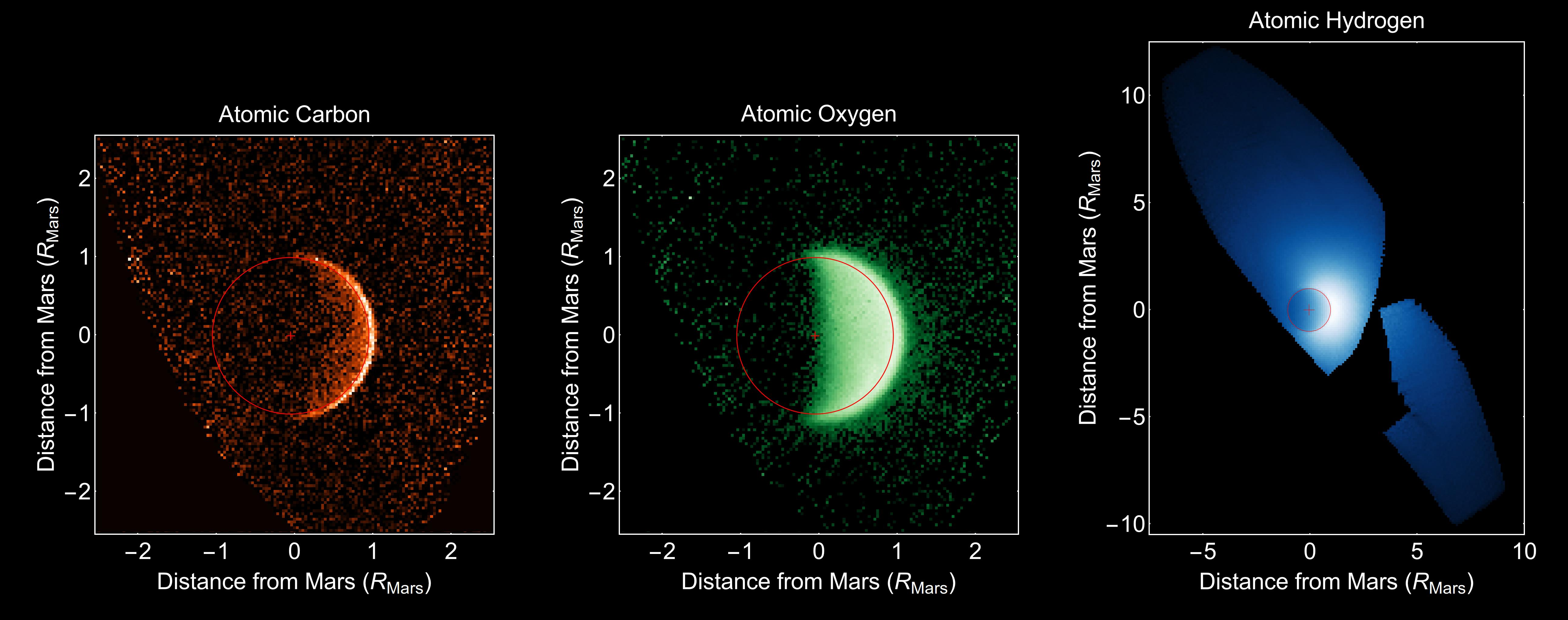
Escaping atmosphere on Mars (carbon, oxygen, and hydrogen) by MAVEN in UV

One key aspect of terraforming Mars is to protect the atmosphere (both present and future-built) from being lost into space. Some scientists hypothesize that creating a planet-wide artificial magnetosphere would be helpful in resolving this issue. According to two NIFS Japanese scientists, it is feasible to do that with current technology by building a system of refrigerated latitudinal superconducting rings, each carrying a sufficient amount of direct current.

In the same report, it is claimed that the economic impact of the system can be minimized by using it also as a planetary energy transfer and storage system (SMES).

==== Magnetic shield at L_{1} orbit ====
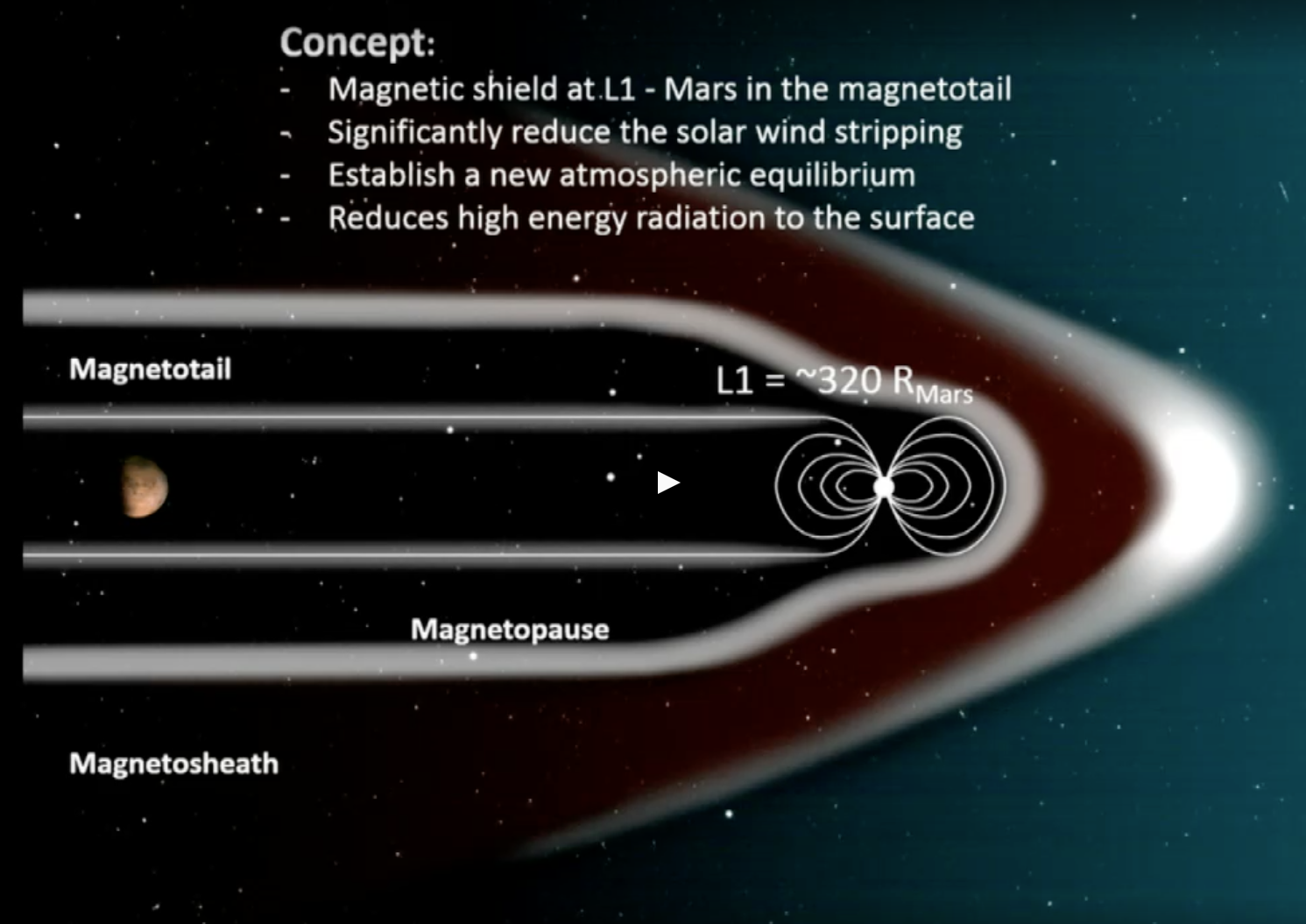
Magnetic shield on L1 orbit around Mars

During the Planetary Science Vision 2050 Workshop in late February 2017, NASA scientist Jim Green proposed a concept of placing a magnetic dipole field between the planet and the Sun to protect it from high-energy solar particles. It would be located at the Mars Lagrange orbit L_{1} at about 320 R_{♂}, creating a partial and distant artificial magnetosphere. The field would need to be "Earth comparable" and sustain 50 μT as measured at 1 Earth-radius. The paper abstract cites that this could be achieved by a magnet with a strength of 1–2 teslas (10,000–20,000 gauss). If constructed, the shield may allow the planet to partially restore its atmosphere.

==== Plasma torus along the orbit of Phobos ====
A plasma torus along the orbit of Phobos by ionizing and accelerating particles from the moon may be sufficient to create a magnetic field strong enough to protect a terraformed Mars.

=== Oxygen from electrolysis of water ===
An abundance of groundwater on Mars was discovered in 2024. It is estimated that 7 Zettawatt-hours of electricity would need to be produced from nuclear fusion or fission to produce oxygen levels equivalent to Earth's atmosphere, by splitting water into hydrogen and oxygen by electrolysis. 120 trillion tons of hydrogen and 880 trillion tons of oxygen would be produced in the process, along with water vapor from the power plants.

=== Paraterraforming and GMO designer plants ===
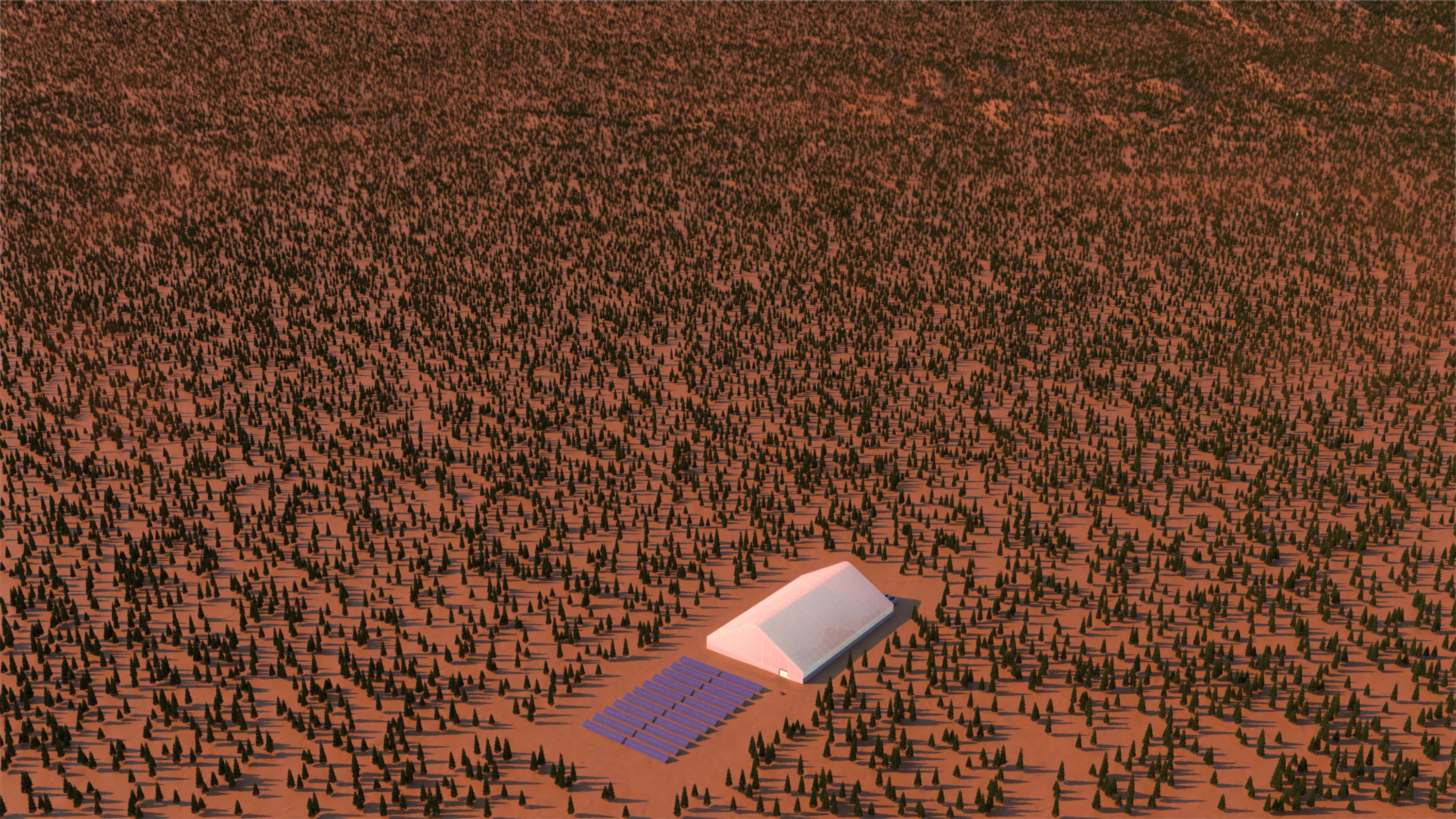
3D sketch of a Mars tension fabric greenhouse with genetically modified plants outside, gene edited Pine trees or Conifers

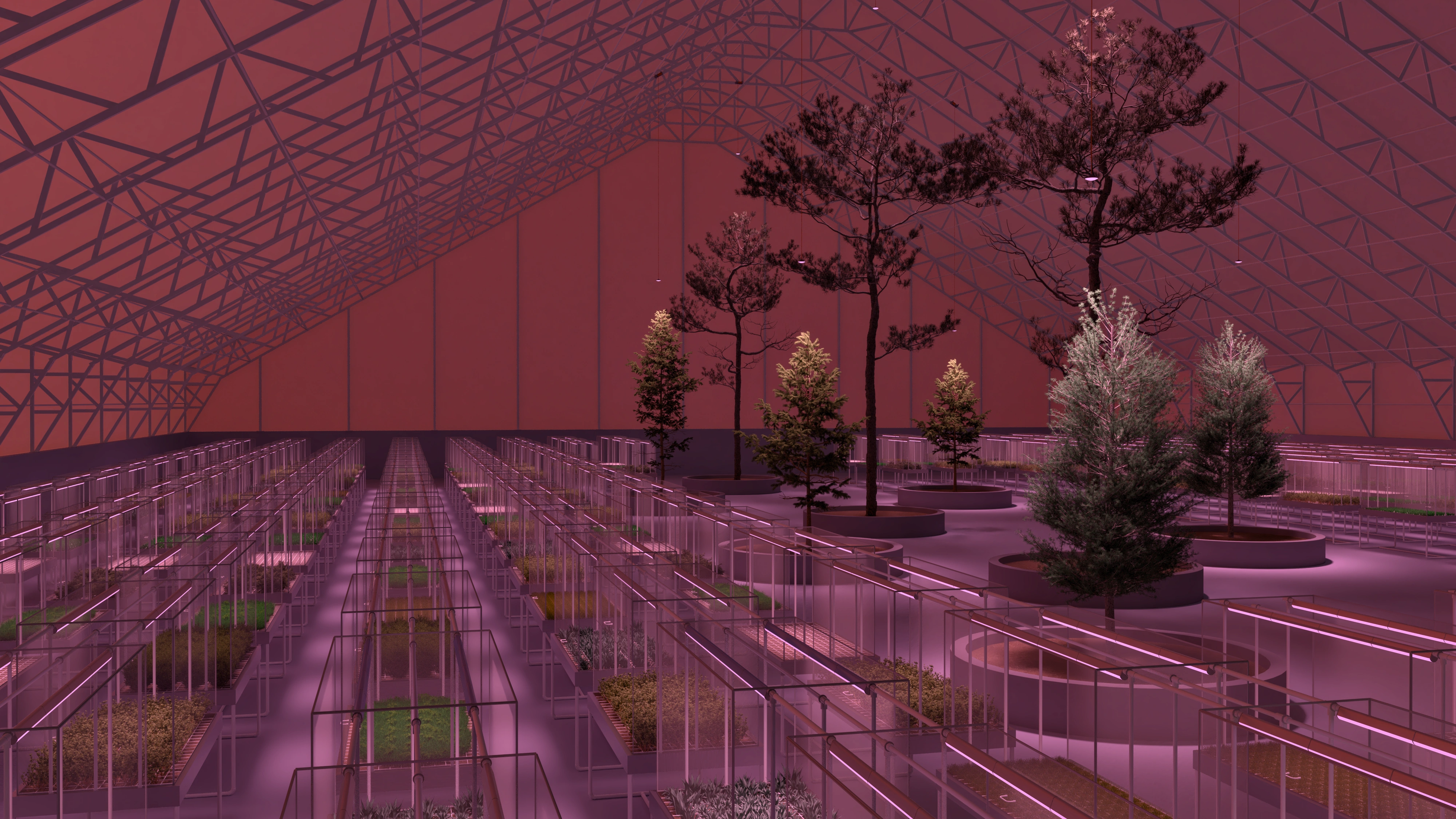
Inside tension fabric greenhouse with plant LED incubators and automatic irrigation controlled watering on a grow table

Paraterraforming is a concept to build habitable greenhouses or bio-domes to help build plant life on other planets. NASA's NIAC is sponsoring NC State which is working on designer plants/trees or genetically modified vegetation that could survive better on Mars. Using CRISPR gene editing from Extremophiles on Earth to help withstand the harsh Martian regolith and atmosphere, such as ultraviolet radiation, extreme cold, low atmospheric pressure, perchlorates, and drought tolerance.

The plants could be tested outdoors to try and start an ecosystem for the full terraforming of Mars. A JPL-Harvard team has shown that insulating silica aerogel can enable local Martian habitability via the solid-state greenhouse effect. Harvard scientists have demonstrated growth of green algae in a 3D printed bioplastic habitat under Mars-relevant conditions of a 600 Pa CO_{2} background atmosphere. This result shows that the products of biology itself can be used to create habitats in extraterrestrial environments.

Another source of potential Mars-adaptive mutations is gene editing, the direct change of genes already found in a plant. A 2023 study showed that regular rice can germinate in Mars-like soil, represented by a mixture of the MMS1 Martian regolith simulant with potassium perchlorate, though the growth is reduced. Perchlorate tolerance appears to depend on the presence of two stress-resistance genes SnRK1a and TOR. It was proposed that future editing of SnRK1a could create rice with higher perchlorate resistance.

== Thermodynamics of terraforming ==
The overall energy required to sublimate the CO_{2} from the south polar ice cap was modeled by Zubrin and McKay in 1993. If using orbital mirrors, an estimated 120 MW-years of electrical energy would be required to produce mirrors large enough to vaporize the ice caps. This is considered the most effective method, though the least practical. If using powerful halocarbon greenhouse gases, an order of 1,000 MW-years of electrical energy would be required to accomplish this heating.

If all of this CO_{2} were put into the atmosphere, it would only double the current atmospheric pressure from 6 mbar to 12 mbar, amounting to about 1.2% of Earth's mean sea level pressure. The amount of warming that could be produced today by putting even 100 mbar of CO_{2} into the atmosphere is small, roughly of order 10 K. Once in the atmosphere, it likely would be removed quickly, either by diffusion into the subsurface and adsorption or by re-condensing onto the polar caps.

The surface or atmospheric temperature required to allow liquid water to exist has not been determined, and liquid water conceivably could exist when atmospheric temperatures are as low as 245 K (−28 °C; −19 °F). A warming of 10 K is much less than thought necessary to produce liquid water.

== See also ==
- Astrobotany – Study of plants grown in spacecraft
- Areography (geography of Mars)
- Colonization of Mars
- Human mission to Mars – Proposed concepts
- Mars habitat – Facility where humans could live on Mars
- Mars in fiction § Terraforming
- Mars to Stay – Mars colonization architecture proposing no return vehicles
- Terraforming of Venus – Engineering the global environment of Venus to make it suitable for humans
- Colonization of the Solar System – Concept of permanent human habitation outside of Earth
- Groundwater on Mars – Water held in permeable ground
