= Space advocacy =

Advocacy for exploration and/or colonization of space

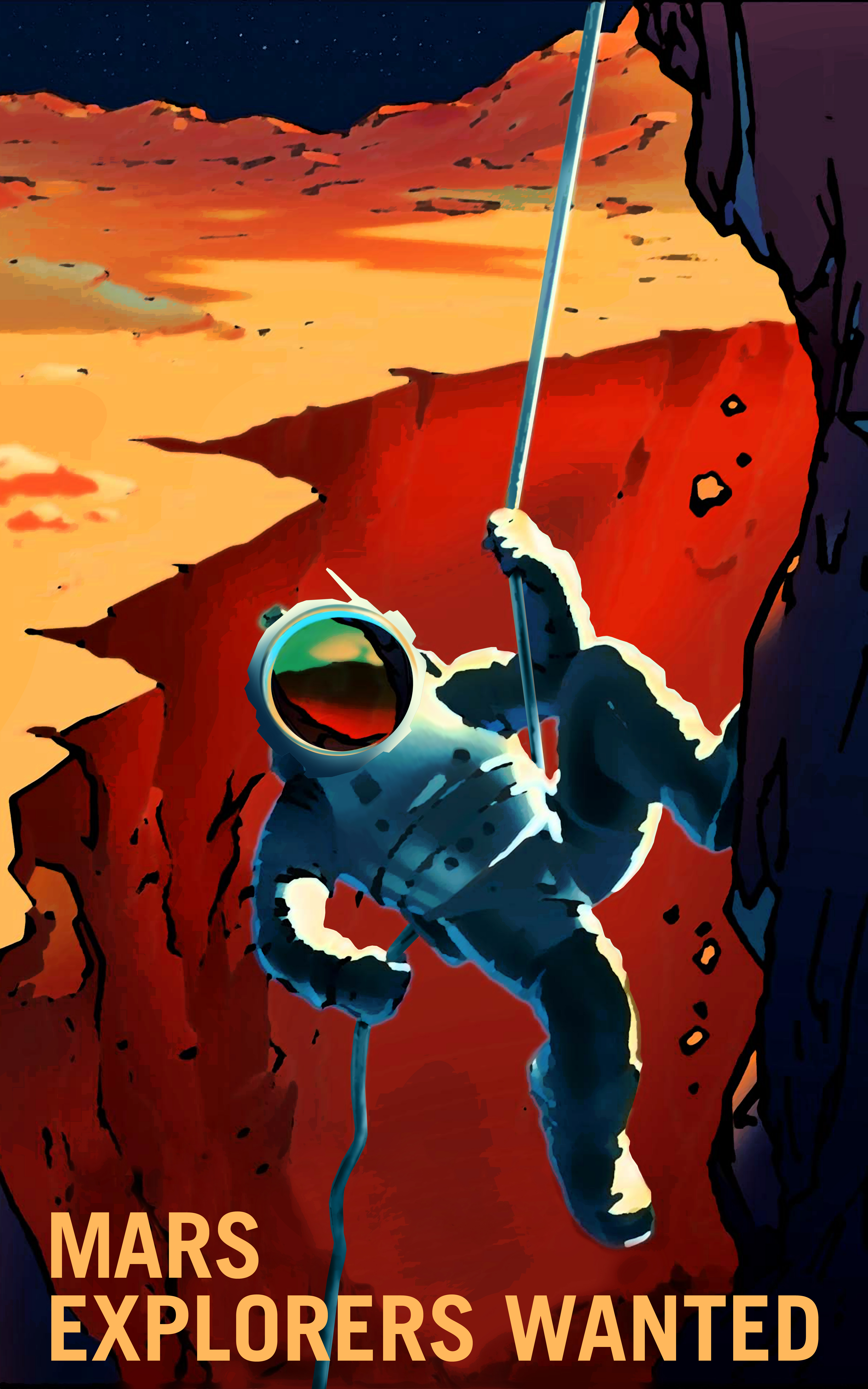
NASA's artistic poster about the human exploration of Mars: "Mars explorers wanted"

Space advocacy is supporting or advocating human activity in outer space. The advocated purposes range from orbital flight, space exploration, commercialization of space and space settlement, to outright space colonization.

There are many different individuals and organizations dedicated to space advocacy. They are usually active in educating the public on space-related subjects, lobbying governments for increased funding in space-related activities or supporting private space activities.

They also recruit members, fund projects, and provide information for their membership and interested visitors. They are sub-divided into three categories depending on their primary work: practice, advocacy, and theory.

== History ==
The idea that space flight was possible and necessary was introduced by groups of thinkers, primarily members of the Russian, American, British, and German science communities, who formed in the 1920s the first advocacy groups. Starting in the 1930s, these groups began to share their plans for a future in space to their respective governments and the public.

Influential books and other media began to emerge which included works containing illustrations by Chesley Bonestell (based on Wernher von Braun's designs) such as The Conquest of Space (1949) and magazine articles including the "Man Will Conquer Space Soon!" series of article in Colliers magazine between 1952 and 1954. Television shows included Walt Disney's "Man in Space" and "Man and the Moon" in 1955, and "Mars and Beyond" in 1957.

== Space movement ==
In 2004 most of the leading US non-profit space organizations joined together to form the Space Exploration Alliance. The Alliance was formed to "advocate for the exploration and development of outer space" to members of Congress. The Alliance organizes the annual Legislative Blitz to lobby members of Congress for space exploration, and every space enthusiast is encouraged to participate in the Legislative Blitz by calling, emailing, or personally visiting their Congressperson's office.

An analysis of space advocacy in Dark Skies: Space Expansionism, Planetary Geopolitics, and the Ends of Humanity by Daniel Deudney has identified two different paradigms: the Braun-Tsiolkovsky paradigm (VTP), focusing on migration and militarization of space, and the Clarke-Sagan paradigm (CSP), focusing on space exploration.

According to Mark Hopkins from the National Space Society, each space organization has a different priority and short-term objective, but all organizations share the ultimate goal of building space settlements.

== Decolonizing space ==
To reach a more inclusive spaceflight and space science some organizations like the JustSpace Alliance (see Lucianne Walkowicz) and IAU featured Inclusive Astronomy have been formed in recent years. Holding events like the unconference Decolonizing Mars in 2018. Advocates of this issue see the need for inclusive and democratic participation and implementation of any space exploration, infrastructure or habitation, questioning the decision making of and reasons for any colonial space policy, labour and land exploitation with postcolonial critique. Private and state funded advocacy for space colonization, specifically the rationales and politico-legal regimes behind space exploration, like the "New Frontier" slogan, have been criticized for applying settler colonialism and the manifest destiny ideology, perpetuating imperialism and the narrative of colonial exploration as fundamental to the assumed human nature.

Participation and representation of humanity in space is an issue of human access to and presence in space ever since the beginning of spaceflight. Even though some rights of non-spacefaring countries to partake in spaceflight have been secured through international space law, declaring space the "province of all mankind", understanding spaceflight as its resource, sharing of outer space for all humanity has been criticized as still imperialist and lacking. For example arguments for space as a solution to global problems like pollution and related narratives of survival are considered imperialist by Joon Yun. Having a considerate policy towards space is seen as an imperative to allow a thoroughly sustainable human society also on Earth.

== List of organizations ==
=== Actively involved ===
Organizations that are directly involved in space exploration, having their own active projects.

Organisation	Founded	Purpose and goals	Pursuits	Website
SETI Institute	1984, United States	to search for extraterrestrial intelligent life	Runs SETI	Official website
The Planetary Society	1980, United States	to explore the Solar System, search for near-Earth objects, and search for extraterrestrial life	Launched Cosmos 1	Official website
Artemis Project		was a private venture to establish a permanent, self-supporting base on the Moon by 2002		Official website
Space Studies Institute	1977, United States	(2012:) to organize and implement The Great Enterprise Initiative, a road map outlining the technologies and capabilities necessary for space settlement. Current projects include "G-Lab, a space-based variable or partial gravity laboratory [and] E-Lab, a terrestrial 'systems-of-systems' integration lab that will bring together promising closed environment life support technologies into a comprehensive life support solution for space settlement."	Runs Space Manufacturing conferences	Official website
British Interplanetary Society	1933, United Kingdom	to inspire people about space so that humanity builds a future beyond the Earth. It is devoted to initiating, promoting and disseminating new concepts and technical information about space flight and astronautics. It has been running technical studies since the 1930s. It is an international membership society and a UK-registered charity.	1930s Moon mission, 1970s interstellar probe Daedalus	Official website

=== Lobbying ===
Organizations that focus mainly on lobbying government agencies and businesses to step up their efforts.

Organisation	Founded	Purpose and goals	Website
Air & Space Forces Association	1946, United States	Promotes dominant U.S. Air & Space Forces	Official website
American Astronautical Society	1954, United States	dedicated to the advancement of space science and exploration	Official website
National Space Institute	1974–1987, United States	to help maintain public support for the US space program (later became the National Space Society)	
L5 Society	1975–1987, United States	to promote the space colony ideas of Gerard K. O'Neill (later became the National Space Society)	
Citizens' Advisory Council on National Space Policy	1980, United States	was a group of prominent American citizens concerned with US space policy	
Students for the Exploration and Development of Space	1980, United States	to promote space exploration and development through educational and engineering projects	Official website
Space Force Association	2019, United States	Achieve superior national space power by shaping a Space Force that provides credible deterrence in competition, dominant capability in combat, and professional services for all partners.	Official website
Space Frontier Foundation	1988, United States	to promote large-scale settlement of the inner Solar System, under strong free market capitalism	Official website
Mars Society	1998, International	to encouraging the exploration and settlement of Mars	Official website
Moon Society	2000, International	to encouraging the exploration, economic development, and settlement of the Moon	Official website
California Space Authority	2001, United States	"to foster the development of specified activities in California related to space flight."	Official website
Space Exploration Alliance	2004, United States	An alliance of major non-profit space organizations.	Official website
Coalition for Deep Space Exploration	United States	"aerospace industry companies that are collaborating to advance the cause of space exploration."	Official website
Penny4NASA	2012, United States	to advocate for the increase of the NASA budget to 1% of the federal budget, or one penny of every tax dollar	Official website
SpacePAC	2014, United States	Political action committee committed to electing pro-space candidates to office.	Official website
Alliance for Space Development	2015, United States	An alliance of major non-profit space organizations.	Official website

=== Educating and publicizing ===
Organisations involved in educating the public, to boost their understanding and enthusiasm about space.

Organisation	Founded	Purpose and goals	Website
Canadian Space Society	1983, Canada	to sponsor, promote and engage in activities designed to promote increased knowledge of space	Official website
National Space Society	1987, United States	an organization with the vision of "people living and working in thriving communities beyond the Earth," from the merger of L5 Society and National Space Institute	Official website
International Space University	1987, France	a university dedicated to the discovery, research and development of outer space exploration for peaceful purposes	Official website
TMRO	2008, United States	a multimedia, internet based broadcaster dedicated to getting"...the planet excited about living among the stars."	Official website
Space Foundation	1983, United States	to advance space-related endeavors to inspire, enable and propel humanity.	Official website
Tau Zero Foundation	2004, United States	to work together toward practical interstellar flight and to use this quest to teach about science, technology, and our place in the universe	Official website
Initiative for Interstellar Studies	2012, United Kingdom	Conducts activities and research relating to the challenges of achieving robotic and human interstellar flight.	Official website
Space for Humanity	2018, United States	An education-oriented non-profit organization expanding access to space, training the leaders of tomorrow, and cultivating a movement towards a more harmonious world.	Official website
Space Studies Institute	1977, United States	"open the energy and material resources of space for human benefit within our lifetime"	Official website
Students for the Exploration and Development of Space (SEDS)	1980, United States	Worldwide student space advocacy.	Official website
The Space Court Foundation	United States	a 501(c)(3) educational nonprofit corporation that promotes and supports space law and policy education and the rule of law.	Official website
The Secure World Foundation	United States	promotes cooperative solutions for space sustainability and the peaceful uses of outer space, for the benefit of all countries.	Official website

=== Theorizing ===
Organisations that focus on advocating theoretical work.

Organisation	Founded	Purpose and goals	Website
Alliance to Rescue Civilization		devoted to the establishment of an off-Earth "backup" of human civilization	Official website
Living Universe Foundation		has a detailed plan in which the entire galaxy is colonized.	Official website
The Mars Foundation		through its Mars Homestead Project, is developing a unified plan for building the first habitat on Mars by exploiting local materials.	Official website
Build the Enterprise		theorises the possibility of building a spaceship similar in appearance to the USS Enterprise from Star Trek using current technology within the next two decades.	Official website

== See also ==
- Chinese exclusion policy of NASA
- Russian cosmism
- NewSpace
- Politics of the International Space Station
- Science-fiction
- Space art
- Space law
- Space Race
- Space policy
- Politics of outer space
