= California Space Authority =

American state government agency

- Logo

Agency overview
- Abbreviation: CSA
- Preceding agency: California Space and Technology Alliance
- Dissolved: July 10, 2011
- Type: Spaceport; Government contractor
- Jurisdiction: California
- Headquarters: Santa Maria, California
- Executive director: Andrea Seastrand

The California Space Authority (CSA) was a nonprofit corporation representing the commercial, civil, and national defense/homeland security interests of California's diverse space enterprise community in four domains: Industry, Government, Academia, and Workforce. CSA was also a participating member in the Coalition for Space Exploration. It officially ceased operations on June 10, 2011.

== Overview ==
Former schoolteacher, Assemblywoman and Congresswoman Andrea Seastrand served as the Executive Director of CSA, which was governed by a statewide board of directors, composed of twelve members elected by the CSA Membership. Four directors were selected from each of CSA's three regions (Northern, Central, and Southern California) during elections that are held in the Fall in which each director was elected to a 3-year term. The terms of office were staggered such that half of the seats on the board are up for election each year. The Board would also fill additional 1-year seats with CSA members to ensure adequate representation was met across CSA's constituent types (industry, government, academia, large, small, etc.).

Designated as California's Spaceport Authority, CSA was tasked by the state of California to operate as a member-based "enterprise" association that worked closely with individual, corporate, state and local government and academic stakeholders throughout the state. The main purpose of CSA was to facilitate California's competitiveness within the aerospace industry. In this capacity, CSA was also authorized to facilitate development of California-based spaceports.

Including space-related companies, individual entrepreneurs, government agencies, non-profit organizations and College and University research programs, California's space enterprise provides or supports the delivery of hundreds of space-related products and services to the state and the nation. The total economic impact of California's space enterprise (Commercial, Civil, National Security) was estimated to be in excess of $120 billion. Representing 24% of the global space market, California space enterprise impacts over 251,000 jobs statewide.

Some of the CSA's major responsibilities were to:

- Serve as the official voice of the State of California on space technology issues to the federal government, other state governments, local governments and the private sector;
- Act as the official policy advisor to the Governor and State Legislature on space-related matters;
- Link statewide resources and capital to California space and technology enterprises;
- Promote California as an international center of space technology;
- Coordinate the development of the California Strategic Space Plan, and;
- Design and administer a competitive grant program.

== History ==
The predecessor organization to the California Space Authority (CSA) was the California Space and Technology Alliance (CSTA). The first CSA Board of Directors was seated in January 2001.

The California Space and Technology Alliance was established in 1996 as a 501(c)(6) non-profit organization to foster development of space industry and was officially recognized by the state when Governor Pete Wilson signed Assembly Bill 1475 into law in October 1997. AB 1475, co-sponsored by state senator John Vasconcellos and assemblymembers Jim Cunneen, Elaine K. Alquist and Liz Figueroa created the CSTA "to foster the development of specified activities in California related to space flight." The vision of the CSTA was that "California leads the world in space education, research, technology, manufacturing, services and transportation."

The bill also authorized the CSTA to function as the California Spaceport Authority (one of five spaceport authorities in the nation) and set forth the duties of the CSTA. One such duty was to administer the Space Flight Competitive Grant Program.

Prior to enactment of AB 1475, California, which had been a leader in the space industry, did not have a coordinated, statewide voice on space issues. By creating the CSTA, AB 1475 provided a vehicle for such a unified voice. The CSTA served as the official policy advisor to the Governor and the Legislature on space-related matters, while acting as an advocate for the state on space technology issues (CA Government Code 15333.3).

Governed by a statewide board of directors, the space authority was a private nonprofit group whose headline members included Lockheed Martin, Boeing, Northrop Grumman and Raytheon. However, it had managed more than $16 million in taxpayer funds since the 1990s.

Over the past decade, the group's major focus was the California Space Center, a proposed 46,000-square-metre (500,000 sq ft) complex envisioned as providing education, entertainment, cultural activities and office space just outside the only spaceport on the West Coast at Vandenberg Air Force Base in Santa Barbara County.

In January 2011, the CSA was within months of signing a final lease with the Air Force and breaking ground. However, just two months later in March, CSA leadership halted those plans. The space authority said it had determined the California Space Center would have had to navigate Santa Barbara County's strict environmental review process, which would have added three to five years of hearings and approvals before construction could start. CSA had signaled its intent to move the center within the city limits of Lompoc, where city leaders welcomed the project.

On June 10, 2011, officials announced the CSA Board of Directors had agreed the previous Monday to begin the dissolution process, with members voting in favor of breaking up the organization. According to Janice Dunn, former deputy director, a lack of funding led to the decision. In the past few months, the organization learned an expected $5 million in federal money wouldn't be coming through, due in large part to the economic recession.

The dissolution also signaled an end to plans to develop the California Space Center. Difficulty in establishing the planned space center were also cited as reasons for dissolving the corporation. Santa Barbara County’s environmental review process was to add and additional three to five years to the process before construction could even start.

The California Space Authority, Inc., (CSA) has initiated the process of dissolving the non-profit corporation in accordance with state law and the by-laws of the organization,” the group said in an e-mail statement to supporters. “The CSA board of directors voted unanimously on June 6, 2011, to begin the dissolution process and the members of CSA subsequently voted in favor of corporate dissolution. CSA will cease to operate effective today, June 10, 2011." – Official statement released to media.

== See also ==
- New Mexico Spaceport Authority
- Oklahoma Space Industry Development Authority
- Space Florida
- Virginia Commercial Space Flight Authority
