= American Astronautical Society =

Scientific organization formed in 1954

- Abbreviation: AAS
- Formation: January 22, 1954; 72 years ago
- Type: NGO
- Website: www.astronautical.org

Formed in 1954, the American Astronautical Society (AAS) is an independent scientific and technical group in the United States dedicated to the advancement of space science and space exploration. AAS supports NASA's Vision for Space Exploration and is a member of the Coalition for Space Exploration and the Space Exploration Alliance. The AAS also focuses on strengthening the global space program through cooperation with international space organizations. The society has a long history of supporting space exploration through scholarships.

== Members ==
AAS members include: engineers, scientists, administrators, institutions and corporations working in support of the nation's space activities, as well as military space specialists, physicians, lawyers, educators, historians, journalists, artists and other professionals.

== Activities ==
The AAS runs national meetings, symposia and publications. Members meet with leaders in their field and in related disciplines, exchange information and ideas, discuss career aspirations and expand their horizons.

The AAS sponsors professional, scientific and engineering meetings and maintains a publications program.

== Publications ==
The Journal of the Astronautical Sciences is the official journal of the AAS, published by Springer Publishing.

Space Times is a magazine with an American focus looking at recent developments in the history and government approach to space development. In the past, it has included policy speeches by NASA officials and reprints of articles from other sources that are relevant to its membership.

== See also ==
- NewSpace
