= Space colonization =

Concept of permanent human habitation outside of Earth

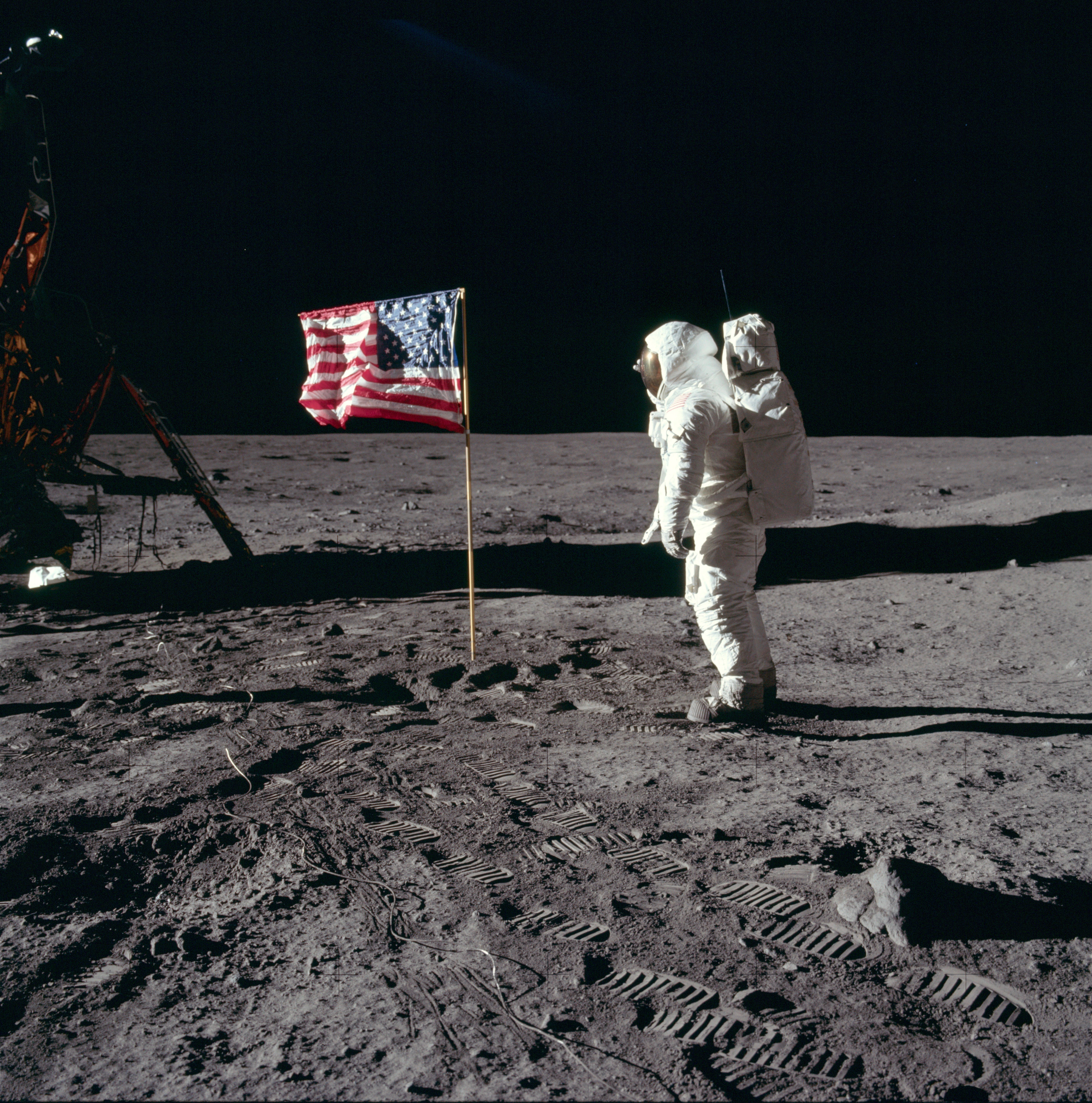
Photo of the first national flag assembled by a human on the Moon (Apollo 11, 1969). With colonization of space having been a critically discussed issue since the dawn of the space age, resulting in the Outer Space Treaty (1967), the flag was not to symbolize any territorial claims.

Space colonization, or extraterrestrial colonization, is the establishment of human settlements or colonies in outer space and on astronomical bodies. The concept, in its broadest sense, has been applied to any permanent human presence in space, such as a space habitat or other extraterrestrial settlements. It may involve notions of territorial occupation, resource control for economic or military purposes, such as extraterrestrial mining, or military practice ground as shown in a space force.

Making territorial claims in space is under prohibition by international space law (ISL), defining space as a common heritage. International space law has had the goal to prevent colonial claims and militarization of space, and has advocated the installation of international regimes to regulate access to and sharing of space, particularly for specific locations such as the limited space of geostationary orbit or the Moon. To date, no permanent space settlement other than temporary space habitats have been established, nor has any extraterrestrial territory or land been internationally claimed. Currently there are also no plans for building a space colony by any government. However, many proposals, speculations, and designs, particularly for extraterrestrial settlements have been made through the years, and a considerable number of space colonization advocates and groups are active. Currently, the dominant private launch provider SpaceX, has been the most prominent organization planning space colonization on Mars, though having not reached a development stage beyond launch and landing systems.

Space colonization raises numerous socio-political questions. Many arguments for and against space settlement have been made. The two most common reasons in favor of colonization are the survival of humans and life independent of Earth, making humans a multiplanetary species, in the event of a planetary-scale disaster (natural or human-made), and the commercial use of space particularly for enabling a more sustainable expansion of human society through the availability of additional resources in space, reducing environmental damage on and exploitation of Earth. The most common objections include concerns that the commodification of the cosmos may be likely to continue pre-existing detrimental processes such as environmental degradation, economic inequality and wars, enhancing the interests of the already powerful, and at the cost of investing in solving existing major environmental and social issues.

The mere construction of an extraterrestrial settlement, with the needed infrastructure, presents daunting technological, economic and social challenges. Space settlements are generally conceived as providing for nearly all (or all) the needs of larger numbers of humans. The environment in space is very hostile to human life and not readily accessible, particularly for maintenance and supply. It would involve much advancement of currently primitive technologies, such as controlled ecological life-support systems. With the high cost of orbital spaceflight (around $1400 per kg, or $640 per pound, to low Earth orbit by SpaceX Falcon Heavy), a space settlement would currently be massively expensive, but ongoing progress in reusable launch systems aim to change that (possibly reaching $20 per kg to orbit), and in creating automated manufacturing and construction techniques.

== Definition ==
Space colonization has been in a broad sense referred to as space settlement, space humanization or space habitation. Space colonization in a narrow sense refers to space settlements, as envisioned by Gerard K. O'Neill. It is characterized by elements such as: settlement and exploitation, as well as territorial claim.

The concept in its broad sense has been applied to any permanent human presence, even robotic, particularly along with the term "settlement", being imprecisely applied to any human space habitat, from research stations to self-sustaining communities in space.

The words colony and colonization are terms rooted in colonial history on Earth, making them human geographic as well as particularly political terms. This broad use for any permanent human activity and development in space has been criticized, particularly as colonialist and undifferentiated (see below Objections).

In this sense, a colony is a settlement that claims territory and exploits it for the settlers or their metropole. Therefore, a human outpost, while possibly a space habitat or even a space settlement, does not automatically constitute a space colony.

Some have argued the presence of certain mechanisms or institutions are symptoms of having achieved a "critical mass"; for instance, sci-fi author Neal Stephenson argued a small Martian colony would feel more like living on a U.S. Navy nuclear submarine than being part of a vibrant community while economists Karl T. Muth and Jodi N. Beggs argued that, to meet American cultural and judicial norms, a Martian colony would need a large enough population to offer a defendant a jury of twelve strangers.

Therefore, any basing can be part of colonization, while colonization can be understood as a process that is open to more claims, beyond basing. The International Space Station, the longest-occupied extraterrestrial habitat thus far, does not claim territory and thus is not usually considered a colony.

Moriba Jah has criticized existing approaches to orbital space as colonialist, such as for satellites, on the grounds that it involves claiming ownership instead of collaborative stewardship.

Some advocates of peaceful human settlement of space have argued against use of the word "colony" and related terms, so as to avoid confusing their goals with colonialism on Earth.

== History ==
In the first half of the 17th century John Wilkins suggested in A Discourse Concerning a New Planet that future adventurers like Francis Drake and Christopher Columbus might reach the Moon and allow people to live there. The first known work on space colonization was the 1869 novella The Brick Moon by Edward Everett Hale, about an inhabited artificial satellite. In 1897, Kurd Lasswitz also wrote about space colonies in his book Auf zwei Planeten (Two Planets). The Russian rocket science pioneer Konstantin Tsiolkovsky foresaw elements of the space community in his book Beyond Planet Earth written about 1900. Tsiolkovsky imagined his space travelers building greenhouses and raising crops in space. Tsiolkovsky believed that going into space would help perfect human beings, leading to immortality and peace. One of the first to speak about space colonization was Cecil Rhodes who in 1902 spoke about "these stars that you see overhead at night, these vast worlds which we can never reach", adding "I would annex the planets if I could; I often think of that. It makes me sad to see them so clear and yet so far". In the 1920s John Desmond Bernal, Hermann Oberth, Guido von Pirquet and Herman Noordung further developed the idea. Wernher von Braun contributed his ideas in a 1952 Colliers magazine article. In the 1950s and 1960s, Dandridge M. Cole published his ideas.

When orbital spaceflight was achieved in the 1950s colonialism was still a strong international project, e.g. easing the United States to advance its space program and space in general as part of a "New Frontier". As the Space Age was developing, decolonization gained again in force, producing many newly independent countries. These newly independent countries confronted spacefaring countries, demanding an anti-colonial stance and regulation of space activity when space law was raised and negotiated internationally. Fears of confrontations because of land grabs and an arms race in space between the few countries with spaceflight capabilities grew and were ultimately shared by the spacefaring countries themselves. This produced the wording of the agreed on international space law, starting with the Outer Space Treaty of 1967, calling space a "province of all mankind" and securing provisions for international regulation and sharing of outer space.

The advent of geostationary satellites raised the case of limited space in outer space. In the 1960s and with an initial focus on communications spectrum management, the international community agreed to regulate the assignment of slots in the geosynchronous (GEO) belt through the International Telecommunication Union (ITU). Today, any company or nation planning to launch a satellite to GEO must apply to the ITU for an orbital slot. A group of equatorial countries, all of which were countries that were once colonies of colonial empires, but without spaceflight capabilities, signed in 1976 the Bogota Declaration. These countries declared that geostationary orbit is a limited natural resource and belongs to the equatorial countries directly below, seeing it not as part of outer space, humanity's common. Through this, the declaration challenged the dominance of geostationary orbit by spacefaring countries through identifying their dominance as imperialistic.

Writers continued to address space colonization concepts by publishing books in the mid-1970s such as The High Frontier: Human Colonies in Space by Gerard K. O'Neill and Colonies in Space by T. A. Heppenheimer.

In 1975, the first international joint space mission occurred as a symbol of the policy of détente that the two superpowers were pursuing at the time. The U.S. Apollo and Soviet Soyuz spacecraft docked in earth orbit for almost two days. In 1977, the first sustained space habitat, the Salyut 6 station, was put into Earth's orbit. Eventually the first space stations were succeeded by the ISS, today's largest human outpost in space and closest to a space settlement. Built and operated under a multilateral regime, it has become a blueprint for future stations, such as around and possibly on the Moon.

Additional discourse on living in space was generated by writers including Marianne J. Dyson who wrote Home on the Moon; Living on a Space Frontier in 2003; Peter Eckart wrote Lunar Base Handbook in 2006 and then Harrison Schmitt's Return to the Moon written in 2007.

An international regime for lunar activity was demanded by the international Moon Treaty, but is currently developed multilaterally as with the Artemis Accords. Threats to existing treaties come in areas such as space debris because of the lack of regulation on disposition of assets by operators (and controlling sovereign power) once their mission is complete. The only habitation on a different celestial body so far have been the temporary habitats of the crewed lunar landers. Similar to the Artemis program, China is leading an effort to develop a lunar base called the International Lunar Research Station beginning in the 2030s.

== Justification ==
=== Survival of human civilization ===
A primary argument calling for space colonization is the long-term survival of human civilization and terrestrial life. By developing alternative locations off Earth, the planet's species, including humans, could live on in the event of natural or human-made disasters on Earth.

On two occasions, theoretical physicist and cosmologist Stephen Hawking argued for space colonization as a means of saving humanity. In 2001, Hawking predicted that the human race would become extinct within the next thousand years unless colonies could be established in space. In 2010, he stated that humanity faces two options: either we colonize space within the next two hundred years, or we will face the long-term prospect of extinction.

In 2005, then NASA Administrator Michael Griffin identified space colonization as the ultimate goal of current spaceflight programs, saying:

... the goal isn't just scientific exploration ... it's also about extending the range of human habitat out from Earth into the solar system as we go forward in time ... In the long run, a single-planet species will not survive ... If we humans want to survive for hundreds of thousands of millions of years, we must ultimately populate other planets. Now, today the technology is such that this is barely conceivable. We're in the infancy of it. ... I'm talking about that one day, I don't know when that day is, but there will be more human beings who live off the Earth than on it. We may well have people living on the Moon. We may have people living on the moons of Jupiter and other planets. We may have people making habitats on asteroids ... I know that humans will colonize the solar system and one day go beyond.

Louis J. Halle Jr., formerly of the United States Department of State, wrote in Foreign Affairs (Summer 1980) that the colonization of space will protect humanity in the event of global nuclear warfare. The physicist Paul Davies also supports the view that if a planetary catastrophe threatens the survival of the human species on Earth, a self-sufficient colony could "reverse-colonize" Earth and restore human civilization. The author and journalist William E. Burrows and the biochemist Robert Shapiro proposed a private project, the Alliance to Rescue Civilization, with the goal of establishing an off-Earth "backup" of human civilization.

Based on his Copernican principle, J. Richard Gott has estimated that the human race could survive for another 7.8 million years, but it is not likely to ever colonize other planets. However, he expressed a hope to be proven wrong, because "colonizing other worlds is our best chance to hedge our bets and improve the survival prospects of our species".

In a theoretical study from 2019, a group of researchers have pondered the long-term trajectory of human civilization. It is argued that due to Earth's finitude as well as the limited duration of the Solar System, mankind's survival into the far future will very likely require extensive space colonization. This 'astronomical trajectory' of mankind, as it is termed, could come about in four steps: First step, space colonies could be established at various habitable locations — be it in outer space or on celestial bodies away from Earth – and allowed to remain temporarily dependent on support from Earth. In the second step, these colonies could gradually become self-sufficient, enabling them to survive if or when the mother civilization on Earth fails or dies. Third step, the colonies could develop and expand their habitation by themselves on their space stations or celestial bodies, for example via terraforming. In the fourth step, the colonies could self-replicate and establish new colonies further into space, a process that could then repeat itself and continue at an exponential rate throughout the cosmos. However, this astronomical trajectory may not be a lasting one, as it will most likely be interrupted and eventually decline due to resource depletion or straining competition between various human factions, bringing about some 'star wars' scenario.

=== Vast resources in space ===
Resources in space, both in materials and energy, are enormous. The Solar System has enough material and energy to support anywhere from several thousand to over a billion times the current Earth-based human population, mostly from the Sun itself.

Asteroid mining will likely be a key player in space colonization. Water and materials to make structures and shielding can be easily found in asteroids. Instead of resupplying on Earth, mining and fuel stations need to be established on asteroids to facilitate better space travel. Optical mining is the term NASA uses to describe extracting materials from asteroids. NASA believes by using propellant derived from asteroids for exploration to the moon, Mars, and beyond will save $100 billion. If funding and technology come sooner than estimated, asteroid mining might be possible within a decade.

Although some items of the infrastructure requirements above can already be easily produced on Earth and would therefore not be very valuable as trade items (oxygen, water, base metal ores, silicates, etc.), other high-value items are more abundant, more easily produced, of higher quality, or can only be produced in space. These could provide (over the long-term) a high return on the initial investment in space infrastructure.

Some of these high-value trade goods include precious metals, gemstones, power, solar cells, ball bearings, semi-conductors, and pharmaceuticals.

The mining and extraction of metals from a small asteroid the size of 3554 Amun or (6178) 1986 DA, both small near-Earth asteroids, may yield 30 times as much metal as humans have mined throughout history. A metal asteroid this size would be worth approximately US$20 trillion at 2001 market prices.

The main impediments to commercial exploitation of these resources are the very high cost of initial investment, the very long period required for the expected return on those investments (The Eros Project plans a 50-year development), and the fact that the venture has never been carried out before—the high-risk nature of the investment.

=== Expansion with fewer negative consequences ===
Expansion of humans and technological progress has usually resulted in some form of environmental devastation, and destruction of ecosystems and their accompanying wildlife. In the past, expansion has often come at the expense of displacing many indigenous peoples, the resulting treatment of these peoples ranging anywhere from encroachment to genocide. Because space has no known life, this need not be a consequence, as some space settlement advocates have pointed out. However, on some bodies of the Solar System, there is the potential for extant native lifeforms and so the negative consequences of space colonization cannot be dismissed.

Counterarguments state that changing only the location but not the logic of exploitation will not create a more sustainable future.

=== Alleviating overpopulation and resource demand ===
An argument for space colonization is to mitigate proposed impacts of overpopulation of Earth, such as resource depletion. If the resources of space were opened to use and viable life-supporting habitats were built, Earth would no longer define the limitations of growth. Although many of Earth's resources are non-renewable, off-planet colonies could satisfy the majority of the planet's resource requirements. With the availability of extraterrestrial resources, demand on terrestrial ones would decline. Proponents of this idea include Stephen Hawking and Gerard K. O'Neill.

Others including cosmologist Carl Sagan and science fiction writers Arthur C. Clarke, and Isaac Asimov, have argued that shipping any excess population into space is not a viable solution to human overpopulation. According to Clarke, "the population battle must be fought or won here on Earth". The problem for these authors is not the lack of resources in space (as shown in books such as Mining the Sky), but the physical impracticality of shipping vast numbers of people into space to "solve" overpopulation on Earth.

=== Other arguments ===
Advocates for space colonization cite a presumed innate human drive to explore and discover, and call it a quality at the core of progress and thriving civilizations.

Nick Bostrom has argued that from a utilitarian perspective, space colonization should be a chief goal as it would enable a very large population to live for a very long time (possibly billions of years), which would produce an enormous amount of utility (or happiness). He claims that it is more important to reduce existential risks to increase the probability of eventual colonization than to accelerate technological development so that space colonization could happen sooner. In his paper, he assumes that the created lives will have positive ethical value despite the problem of suffering.

In a 2001 interview with Freeman Dyson, J. Richard Gott and Sid Goldstein, they were asked for reasons why some humans should live in space. Their answers were:

- Spread life and beauty throughout the universe
- Ensure the survival of our species
- Make money through new forms of space commercialization such as solar-power satellites, asteroid mining, and space manufacturing
- Save the environment of Earth by moving people and industry into space

Biotic ethics is a branch of ethics that values life itself. For biotic ethics, and their extension to space as panbiotic ethics, it is a human purpose to secure and propagate life and to use space to maximize life.

A 2026 Ipsos opinion poll found 59% of Americans find establishing a long-term presence on the Moon important.

== Opposition ==
Space colonization has been seen as a relief to the problem of human overpopulation as early as 1758, and listed as one of Stephen Hawking's reasons for pursuing space exploration. Critics note, however, that a slowdown in population growth rates since the 1980s has alleviated the risk of overpopulation.

Critics also argue that the costs of commercial activity in space are too high to be profitable against Earth-based industries, and hence that it is unlikely to see significant exploitation of space resources in the foreseeable future.

Other objections include concerns that the forthcoming colonization and commodification of the cosmos is likely to enhance the interests of the already powerful, including major economic and military institutions e.g. the large financial institutions, the major aerospace companies and the military–industrial complex, to lead to new wars, and to exacerbate pre-existing exploitation of workers and resources, economic inequality, poverty, social division and marginalization, environmental degradation, and other detrimental processes or institutions.

Additional concerns include creating a culture in which humans are no longer seen as human, but rather as material assets. The issues of human dignity, morality, philosophy, culture, bioethics, and the threat of megalomaniac leaders in these new "societies" would all have to be addressed in order for space colonization to meet the psychological and social needs of people living in isolated colonies.

As an alternative or addendum for the future of the human race, many science fiction writers have focused on the realm of the 'inner-space', that is the computer-aided exploration of the human mind and human consciousness—possibly en route developmentally to a Matrioshka Brain.

Robotic spacecraft are proposed as an alternative to gain many of the same scientific advantages without the limited mission duration and high cost of life support and return transportation involved in human missions.

A corollary to the Fermi paradox—"nobody else is doing it"—is the argument that, because no evidence of alien colonization technology exists, it is statistically unlikely to even be possible to use that same level of technology ourselves.

=== Colonialism ===
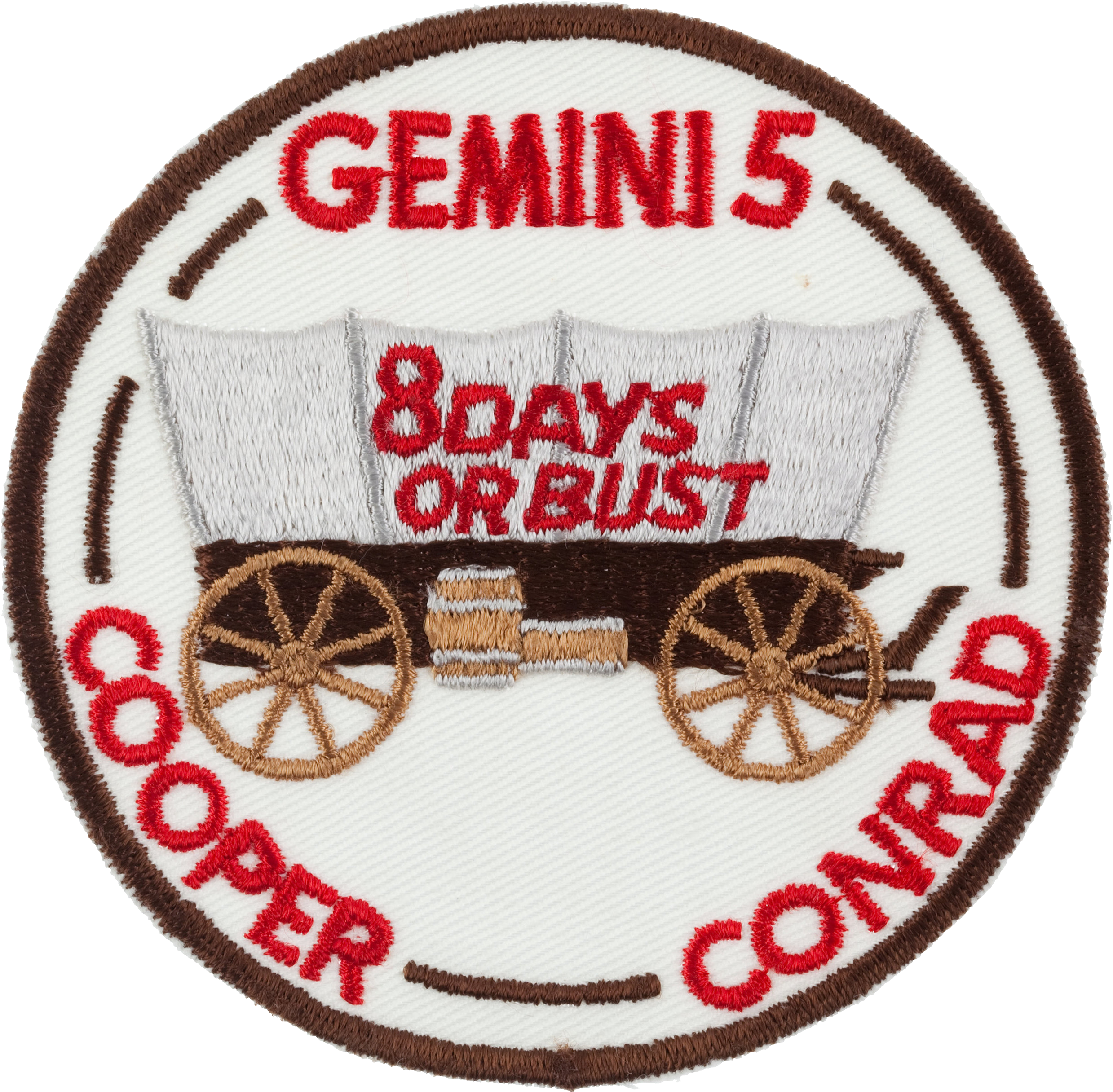
Gemini 5 mission badge (1965) connecting spaceflight to colonial endeavours

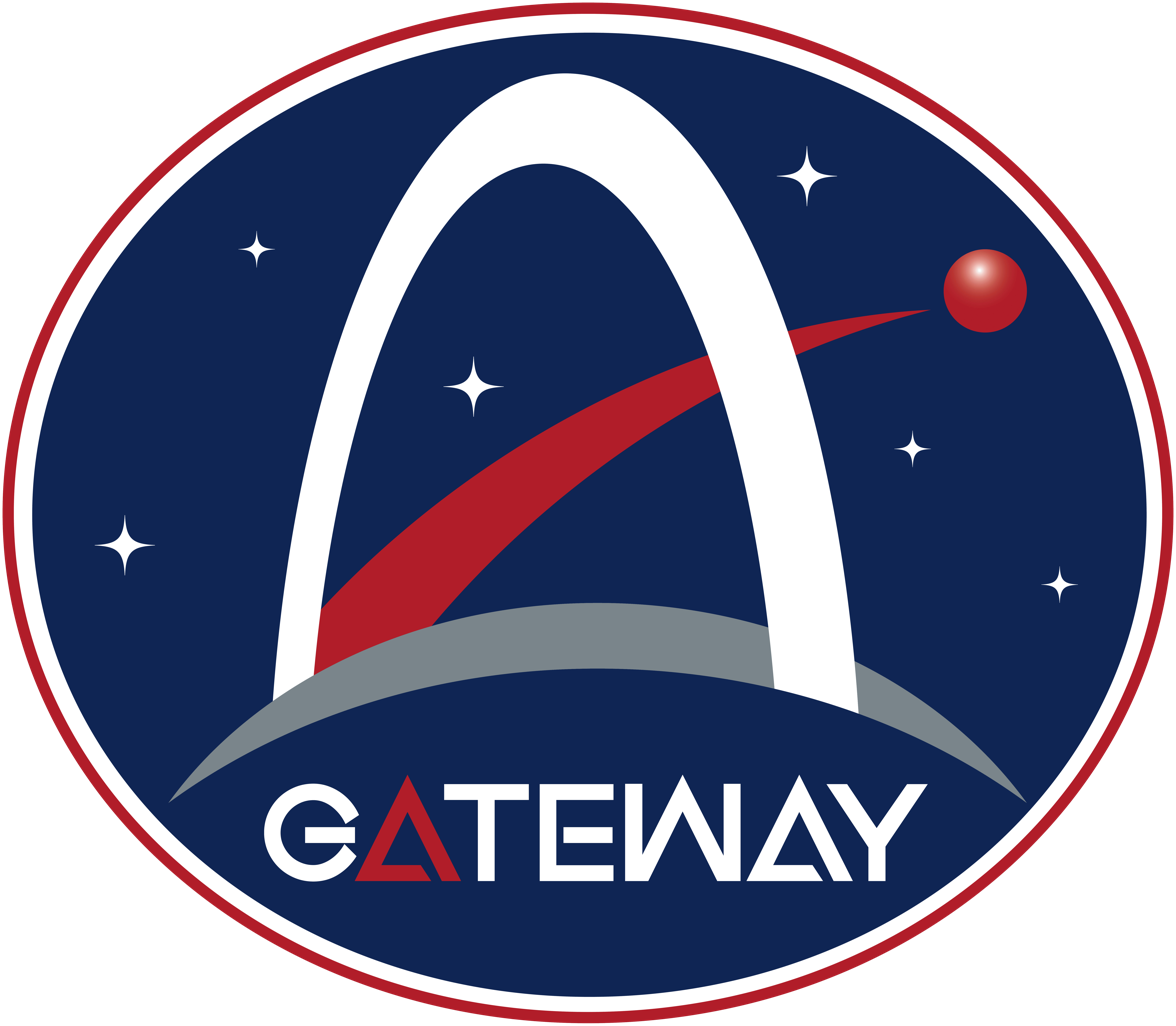
The logo and name of the now cancelled Lunar Gateway references the St. Louis Gateway Arch, which some see as associating Mars with the American frontier and like the Artemis program with the manifest destiny mentality of American settler colonialism.

Space colonization has been discussed as a postcolonial continuation of imperialism and colonialism, with some calling for decolonization instead of colonization. Critics argue that the present politico-legal regimes and their philosophic grounding, advantage imperialist development of space, that key decisionmakers in space colonization are often wealthy elites affiliated with private corporations, and that space colonization would primarily appeal to their peers rather than ordinary citizens. Furthermore, it is argued that there is a need for inclusive and democratic participation and implementation of any space exploration, infrastructure or habitation. According to space law expert Michael Dodge, existing space law, such as the Outer Space Treaty, guarantees access to space, but does not enforce social inclusiveness or regulate non-state actors.

Particularly the narrative of the "New Frontier" has been criticized as unreflected continuation of settler colonialism and manifest destiny, continuing the narrative of exploration as fundamental to the assumed human nature. Joon Yun considers space colonization as a solution to human survival and global problems like pollution to be imperialist; others have identified space as a new sacrifice zone of colonialism.

Furthermore, the understanding of space as empty and separate is considered a continuation of terra nullius.

More specifically the advocacy for territorial colonization of Mars has been called surfacism, in contrast to habitation in the atmospheric space of Venus, a concept similar to Thomas Golds surface chauvinism.

More generally space infrastructure such as the Maunakea Observatories have also been criticized and protested against as being colonialist. Guiana Space Centre has also been the site of anti-colonial protests, connecting colonization as an issue on Earth and in space.

In regard to the scenario of extraterrestrial first contact, it has been argued that the employment of colonial language would endanger such first impressions and encounters.

Furthermore, spaceflight as a whole and space law more particularly has been criticized as a postcolonial project by being built on a colonial legacy and by not facilitating the sharing of access to space and its benefits, too often allowing spaceflight to be used to sustain colonialism and imperialism, most of all on Earth instead.

=== Planetary protection and risk of contamination ===
Agencies conducting interplanetary missions are guided by COSPAR's planetary protection policies, to have at most 300,000 spores on the exterior of the craft—and more thoroughly sterilized if they contact "special regions" containing water, or it could contaminate life-detection experiments or the planet itself.

It is impossible to sterilize human missions to this level, as humans are host to typically a hundred trillion microorganisms of thousands of species of the human microbiome, and these cannot be removed while preserving the life of the human. Containment seems the only option, but it is a major challenge in the event of a hard landing (i.e. crash). There have been several planetary workshops on this issue, but with no final guidelines yet for a way forward. Human explorers could also inadvertently contaminate Earth if they return to the planet while carrying extraterrestrial microorganisms.

== Challenges ==
Colonization beyond the Earth involves overcoming a number of difficult challenges.

=== Distance from Earth ===
The outer planets are much farther from Earth than the inner planets, and would therefore be harder and more time-consuming to reach. In addition, return voyages may well be prohibitive considering the time and distance. Even communication with Earth would be slow, with delays of 4–24 minutes for a message to Mars, and 35–52 minutes to Jupiter and its moons.

=== Extreme environments ===
Extreme cold – due to the distance to the sun, temperatures are near absolute zero in many parts of the outer Solar System.

=== Sustainable power sources ===
Power – Solar power is many times less concentrated in the outer Solar System than in the inner Solar System. It is unclear as to whether it would be usable there, using some form of concentration mirrors, or whether nuclear power would be necessary. Use of geothermal systems to generate power may be practical on some of the planets and moons of the solar system.

=== Physical and mental health risks to colonists ===
The health of the humans who may participate in a colonization venture would be subject to increased physical, mental and emotional risks.

- Effects of low gravity on the human body – All moons of the gas giants and all outer dwarf planets have a very low gravity, the highest being Io's gravity (0.183 g) which is less than 1/5 of the Earth's gravity. Since the Apollo program all crewed spaceflight has been constrained to low Earth orbit and there has been no opportunity to test the effects of such low gravitational accelerations on the human body. It is speculated (but not confirmed) that the low gravity environments might have very similar effects to long-term exposure in weightlessness. Such effects might be avoided by rotating spacecraft creating artificial gravity.
- Dust – breathing risks associated with fine dust from rocky surface objects, for similar reasons as harmful effects of lunar dust.
- NASA learned that – without gravity – bones lose minerals, causing osteoporosis. Bone density may decrease by 1% per month, which may lead to a greater risk of osteoporosis-related fractures later in life. Fluid shifts towards the head may cause vision problems.
- NASA found that isolation in closed environments aboard the International Space Station led to depression, sleep disorders, and diminished personal interactions, likely due to confined spaces and the monotony and boredom of long space flight.
- Circadian rhythm may also be susceptible to the effects of space life due to the effects on sleep of disrupted timing of sunset and sunrise. This can lead to exhaustion, as well as other sleep problems such as insomnia, which can reduce their productivity and lead to mental health disorders. High-energy radiation is a health risk that colonists would face, as radiation in deep space is deadlier than what astronauts face now in low Earth orbit. Metal shielding on space vehicles protects against only 25–30% of space radiation, possibly leaving colonists exposed to the other 70% of radiation and its short and long-term health complications.

== Locations ==
Space colonization has been envisioned at many different locations inside and outside the Solar System, but most commonly on Mars and Earth's moon.

=== Near-Earth space ===
==== Earth orbit ====
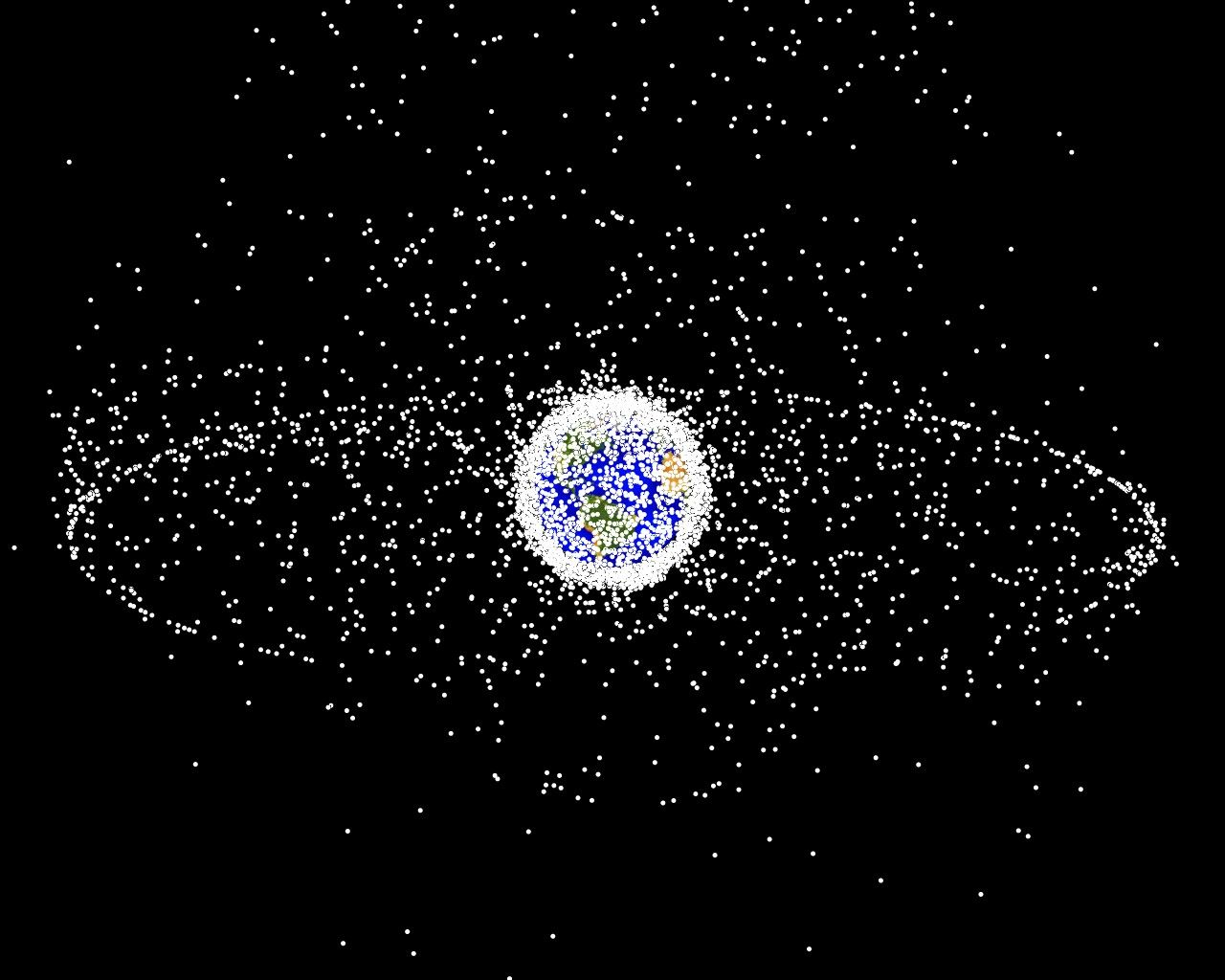
A computer-generated image from 2005 showing the distribution of mostly space debris in geocentric orbit with two areas of concentration: geostationary orbit and low Earth orbit.

Geostationary orbit was an early issue of discussion about space colonization, with equatorial countries arguing for special rights to the orbit (see Bogota Declaration).

Space debris, particularly in low Earth orbit, has been characterized as a product of colonization by occupying space and hindering access to space through excessive pollution with debris, with drastic increases in the course of military activity and without a lack of management.

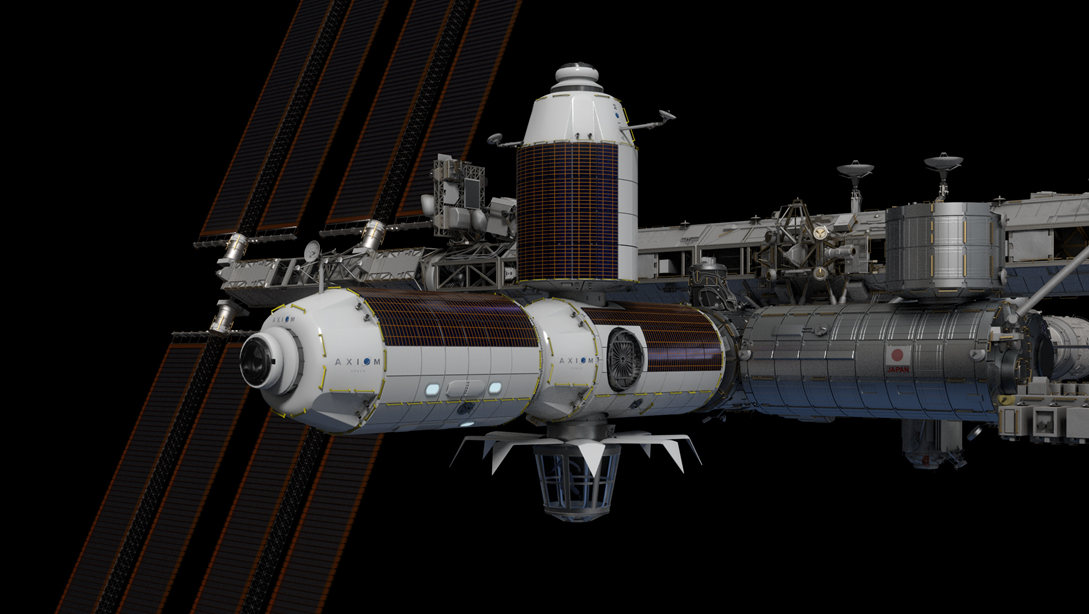
Through the Commercial LEO Destinations program, the Axiom Station can gradually establish commercial uses and become economically sustainable.

Most of the delta-v budget, and thus propellant, of a launch is used bringing a spacecraft to low Earth orbit. This is the main reason why Jerry Pournelle said "If you can get your ship into orbit, you're halfway to anywhere". Therefore, the main advantages to constructing a space settlement in Earth orbit are accessibility to the Earth and already-existing economic motives such as space hotels and space manufacturing. However, a big disadvantage is that orbit does not host any materials that is available for exploitation. Space colonization altogether might eventually demand lifting vast amounts of payload into orbit, making thousands of daily launches potentially unsustainable. Various theoretical concepts, such as orbital rings and skyhooks, have been proposed to reduce the cost of accessing space.

==== Moon ====
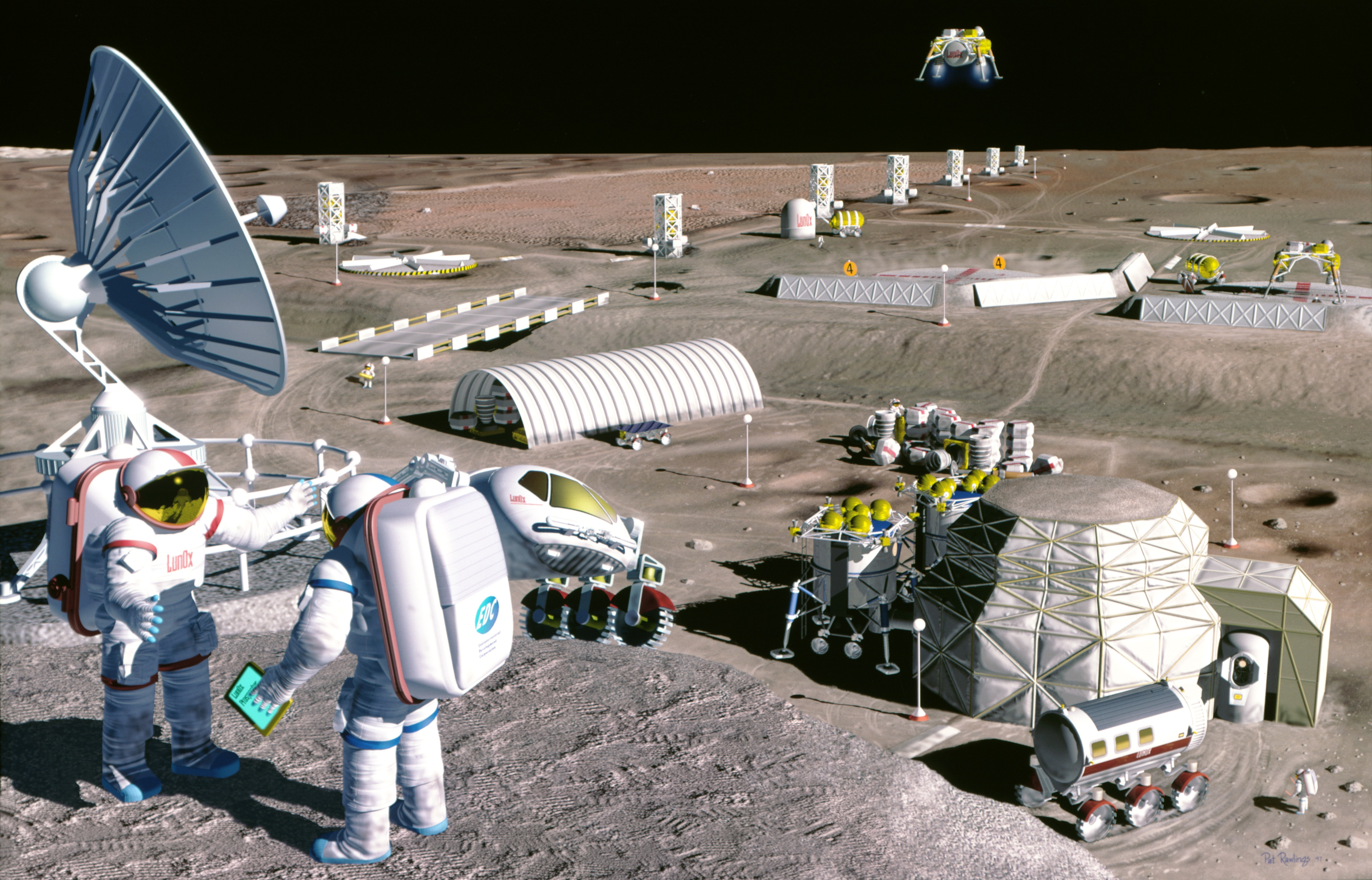
Artist's rendering of an envisioned lunar mining facility (1995)

The Moon is discussed as a target for colonization, due to its proximity to Earth and lower escape velocity. The Moon is reachable from Earth in three days, has a near-instant communication to Earth, with minable minerals, no atmosphere, and low gravity, making it extremely easy to ship materials and products to orbit. Abundant ice is trapped in permanently shadowed craters near the poles, which could provide support for the water needs of a lunar colony, though indications that mercury is also similarly trapped there may pose health concerns. Native precious metals, such as gold, silver, and probably platinum, are also concentrated at the lunar poles by electrostatic dust transport. There are only a few materials on the Moon which have been identified to make economic sense to ship directly back to the Earth, which are helium-3 (for fusion power) and rare-earth minerals (for electronics). Instead, it makes more sense for these materials to be used in-space or being turned into valuable products for export. However, the Moon's lack of atmosphere provides no protection from space radiation or meteoroids, so lunar lava tubes have been proposed sites to gain protection. The Moon's low surface gravity is also a concern, as it is unknown whether 1/6g is enough to maintain human health for long periods.

Since the Moon has extreme temperature swings and toxic lunar regolith, it is argued by some that the Moon will not become a place of habitation, but instead attract polluting extraction and manufacturing industries. Furthermore, it has been argued that moving these industries to the Moon could help protect the Earth's environment and allow poorer countries to be released from the shackles of neocolonialism by wealthier countries. In the space colonization framework, the Moon will be transformed into an industrial hub of the Solar System.

Interest in establishing a moonbase has increased in the 21st century as an intermediate to Mars colonization.

The European Space Agency (ESA) head Jan Woerner at the International Astronautical Congress in Bremen, Germany, in October, 2018 proposed cooperation among countries and companies on lunar capabilities, a concept referred to as Moon Village.

In a December 2017 directive, the first Trump administration steered NASA to include a lunar mission on the pathway to other beyond Earth orbit (BEO) destinations.

In 2023, the U.S. Defense Department started a study of the necessary infrastructure and capabilities required to develop a moon-based economy over the following ten years.

As of 2024, on one side, China, along with other partner countries, has announced its intention to establish the International Lunar Research Station. On the other side, the United States, in collaboration with international partners, is advancing its Artemis program, which includes plans to build moonbases near the lunar poles, close to permanently shadowed craters, in the 2030s. The Chinese Lunar Exploration Program is seen as a means to bolster China's political influence and support its aspirations for superpower status, while the United States aims to maintain its position as the leading space power.

==== Lagrange points ====
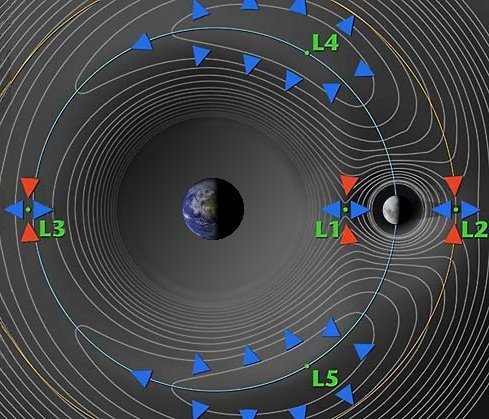
A contour plot of the gravitational potential of the Moon and Earth, showing the five Earth–Moon Lagrange points

Another near-Earth possibility are the stable Earth–Moon Lagrange points L_{4} and L_{5}, at which point a space colony can float indefinitely. The L5 Society was founded to promote settlement by building space stations at these points. Gerard K. O'Neill suggested in 1974 that the stable region around L_{5} could fit several thousand floating colonies, and would allow easy travel to and from the colonies due to the shallow effective potential at this point.

=== Mars ===
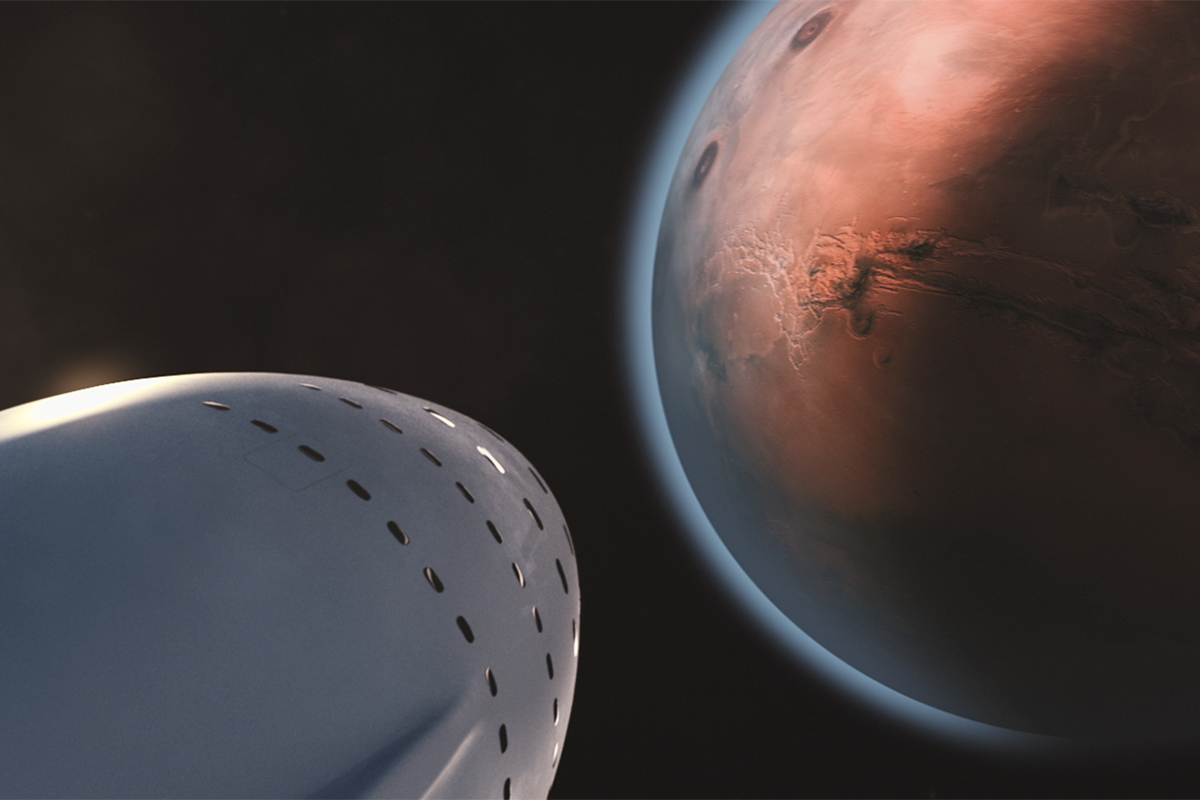
SpaceX has long considered settling and colonizing Mars as its prime objective.

The hypothetical colonization of Mars has received interest from public space agencies and private corporations and has received extensive treatment in science fiction writing, film, and art.

While there have been many plans for a human Mars mission, including affordable ones such as Mars Direct, none has been realized as of 2026. Both the United States and China have plans to send humans to Mars sometime in the 2040s, but these plans are not backed with hardware and funding. However, SpaceX is currently developing Starship, a super-heavy-lift reusable launch vehicle, with a vision of sending humans to Mars. As of November 2024, the company plans to send five uncrewed Starships to Mars in either 2026 or 2028–2029 launch windows and SpaceX's CEO Elon Musk has repeatedly stated his support for the Mars efforts, both financially and politically.

Mars is more suitable for habitation than the Moon, with a stronger gravity, rich amount of materials needed for life, day/night cycle nearly identical to Earth, and a thin atmosphere to protect from micrometeroids. The main disadvantage of Mars compared to the Moon is the six-to-nine-month transit time and the lengthy launch window, which occurs approximately every two years. Without in situ resource utilization, Mars colonization would be nearly impossible as it would require bringing thousands of tons of payload to sustain a handful of astronauts. If Martian materials can be used to make propellant (such as methane with the Sabatier process) and supplies (such as oxygen for crews), the amount of supplies needed to bring to Mars can be greatly reduced. Even then, Mars colonies will not be economically viable in the near term; thus, reasons for colonizing Mars will be mostly ideological and prestige-based, such as a desire for freedom.

=== Other inner Solar System bodies ===
==== Mercury ====
Mercury is rich in metals and volatiles, as well as solar energy. However, Mercury is the most energy-consuming body on the Solar System to land for spacecraft launching from Earth, and astronauts there must contend with the extreme temperature differential and radiation.

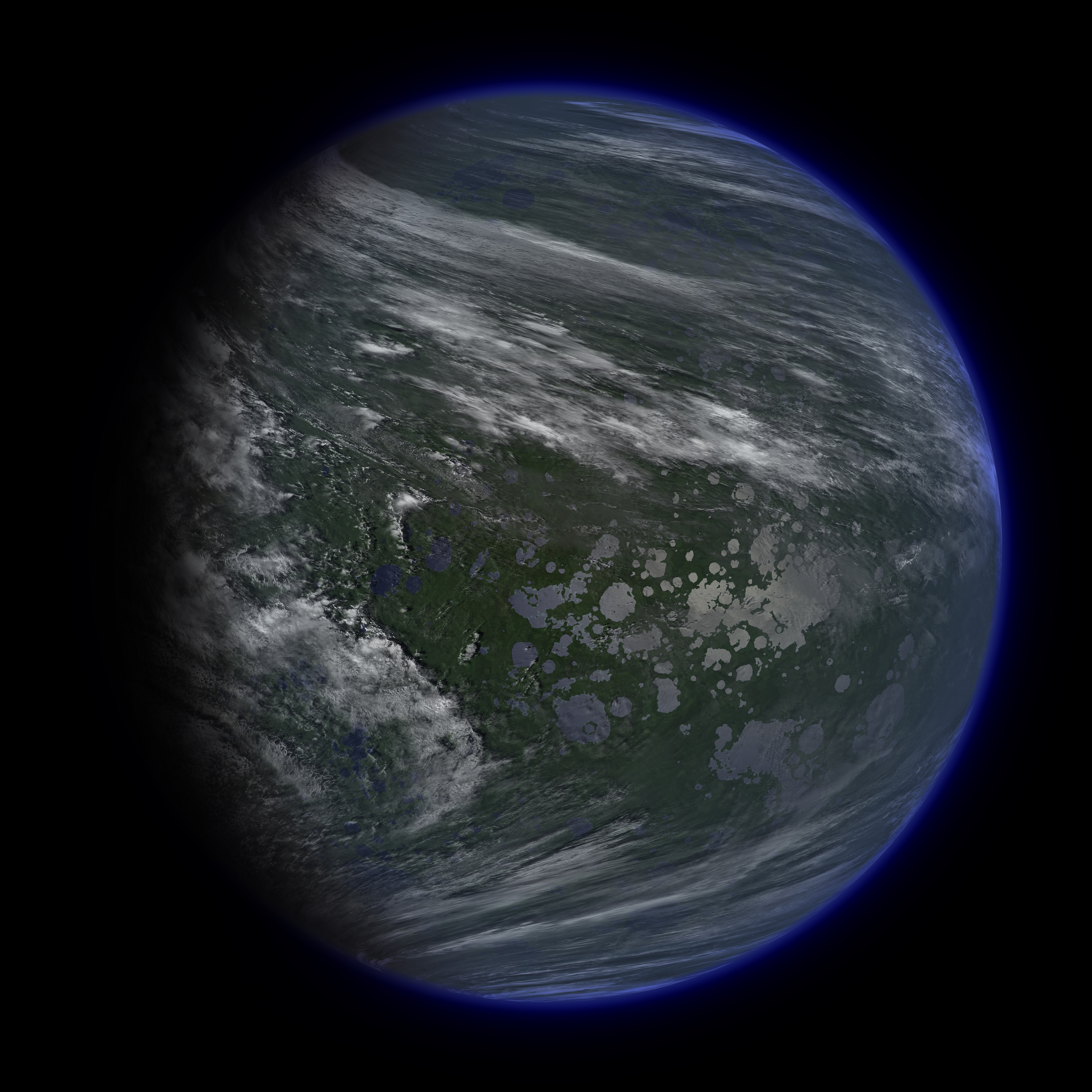
An artist's conception of a terraformed Mercury

Once thought to be a volatile-depleted body like the Moon, Mercury is now known to be volatile-rich, surprisingly richer in volatiles than any other terrestrial body in the inner Solar System. The planet also receives six and a half times the solar flux as the Earth/Moon system, making solar energy an effective energy source; it could be harnessed through orbital solar arrays and beamed to the surface or exported to other planets.

Geologist Stephen Gillett suggested in 1996, that this could make Mercury an ideal place to build and launch solar sail spacecraft, which could launch as folded "chunks" by a mass driver from Mercury's surface. Once in space, the solar sails would deploy. Solar energy for the mass driver should be easy to produce, and solar sails near Mercury would have 6.5 times the thrust they do near Earth. This could make Mercury an ideal place to acquire materials useful in building hardware to send to (and terraform) Venus. Vast solar collectors could also be built on or near Mercury to produce power for large-scale engineering activities such as laser-pushed light sails to nearby star systems.

As Mercury has essentially no axial tilt, crater floors near its poles lie in eternal darkness, never seeing the Sun. They function as cold traps, trapping volatiles for geological periods. It is estimated that the poles of Mercury contain 10^{14}–10^{15} kg of water, likely covered by about 5.65 km^{3} of hydrocarbons. This would make agriculture possible. It has been suggested that plant varieties could be developed to take advantage of the high light intensity and the long day of Mercury. The poles do not experience the significant day-night variations the rest of Mercury do, making them the best place on the planet to begin a colony.

Another option is to live underground, where day-night variations would be damped enough that temperatures would stay roughly constant. There are indications that Mercury contains lava tubes, like the Moon and Mars, which would be suitable for this purpose. Underground temperatures in a ring around Mercury's poles can reach room temperature on Earth, 22±1 °C; and this is achieved at depths starting from about 0.7 m. This presence of volatiles and abundance of energy has led Alexander Bolonkin and James Shifflett to consider Mercury preferable to Mars for colonization.

Yet a third option could be to continually move to stay on the night side, as Mercury's 176-day-long day-night cycle means that the terminator travels very slowly.

Because Mercury is very dense, its surface gravity is 0.38g like Mars, even though it is a smaller planet. This would be easier to adjust to than lunar gravity (0.16g), and presents advantages regarding lower escape velocity from Mercury than from Earth. Mercury's proximity gives it advantages over the asteroids and outer planets, and its low synodic period means that launch windows from Earth to Mercury are more frequent than those from Earth to Venus or Mars.

On the downside, a Mercury colony would require significant shielding from radiation and solar flares, and since Mercury is airless, decompression and temperature extremes would be constant risks.

==== Venus ====
Though the surface of Venus is extremely hostile, habitats high above the surface are fairly habitable, with temperatures ranging from 30 °C to 70 °C (86 to 158 °F) and a pressure similar to the Earth's sea level at an altitude of 50 kilometers (30 miles). However, beside tourism opportunities, the economic benefit of a Venusian colony is minimal.

==== Asteroid belt ====
Asteroids can provide enough material in the form of water, air, fuel, metal, soil, and nutrients to support ten to a hundred trillion humans in space. Many asteroids contain minerals that are inherently valuable, such as rare earths and precious metals. However, low gravity, distance from Earth and disperse nature of their orbits make it difficult to settle on small asteroids.

=== Giant planets ===
There have also been proposals to place robotic aerostats in the upper atmospheres of the Solar System's giant planets for exploration and possibly mining of helium-3, which could have a very high value per unit mass as a thermonuclear fuel.

Robert Zubrin identified Saturn, Uranus and Neptune as "the Persian Gulf of the Solar System", as the largest sources of deuterium and helium-3 to drive a fusion economy, with Saturn the most important and most valuable of the three, because of its relative proximity, low radiation, and large system of moons. On the other hand, planetary scientist John Lewis in his 1997 book Mining the Sky, insists that Uranus is the likeliest place to mine helium-3 because of its significantly shallower gravity well, which makes it easier for a laden tanker spacecraft to thrust itself away. Furthermore, Uranus is an ice giant, which would likely make it easier to separate the helium from the atmosphere.

Because Uranus has the lowest escape velocity of the four giant planets, it has been proposed as a mining site for helium-3. As Uranus is a gas giant without a viable surface, one of Uranus's natural satellites might serve as a base.

It is hypothesized that one of Neptune's satellites could be used for colonization. Triton's surface shows signs of extensive geological activity that implies a subsurface ocean, perhaps composed of ammonia/water. If technology advanced to the point that tapping such geothermal energy was possible, it could make colonizing a cryogenic world like Triton feasible, supplemented by nuclear fusion power.

==== Moons of outer planets ====
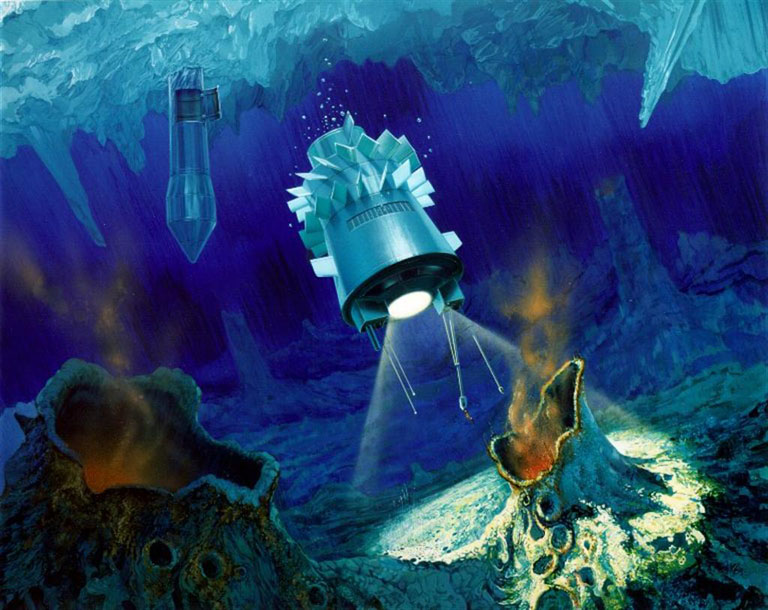
Artist's impression of a hypothetical ocean cryobot in Europa

Human missions to the outer planets would need to arrive quickly due to the effects of space radiation and microgravity along the journey. In 2012, Thomas B. Kerwick wrote that the distance to the outer planets made their human exploration impractical for now, noting that travel times for round trips to Mars were estimated at two years, and that the closest approach of Jupiter to Earth is over ten times farther than the closest approach of Mars to Earth. However, he noted that this could change with "significant advancement on spacecraft design". Nuclear-thermal or nuclear-electric engines have been suggested as a way to make the journey to Jupiter in a reasonable amount of time. Another possibility would be plasma magnet sails, a technology already suggested for rapidly sending a probe to Jupiter. The cold would also be a factor, necessitating a robust source of heat energy for spacesuits and bases. Most of the larger moons of the outer planets contain water ice, liquid water, and organic compounds that might be useful for sustaining human life.

Robert Zubrin has suggested Saturn, Uranus, and Neptune as advantageous locations for colonization because their atmospheres are good sources of fusion fuels, such as deuterium and helium-3. Zubrin suggested that Saturn would be the most important and valuable as it is the closest and has an extensive satellite system. Jupiter's high gravity makes it difficult to extract gases from its atmosphere, and its strong radiation belt makes developing its system difficult. On the other hand, fusion power has yet to be achieved, and fusion power from helium-3 is more difficult to achieve than conventional deuterium–tritium fusion. Jeffrey Van Cleve, Carl Grillmair, and Mark Hanna instead focus on Uranus, because the delta-v required to get helium-3 from the atmosphere into orbit is half that needed for Jupiter, and because Uranus' atmosphere is five times richer in helium than Saturn's.

Jupiter's Galilean moons (Io, Europa, Ganymede, and Callisto) and Saturn's Titan are the only moons that have gravities comparable to Earth's Moon. The Moon has a 0.17g gravity; Io, 0.18g; Europa, 0.13g; Ganymede, 0.15g; Callisto, 0.13g; and Titan, 0.14g. Neptune's Triton has about half the Moon's gravity (0.08g); other round moons provide even less (starting from Uranus' Titania and Oberon at about 0.04g).

==== Jovian moons ====
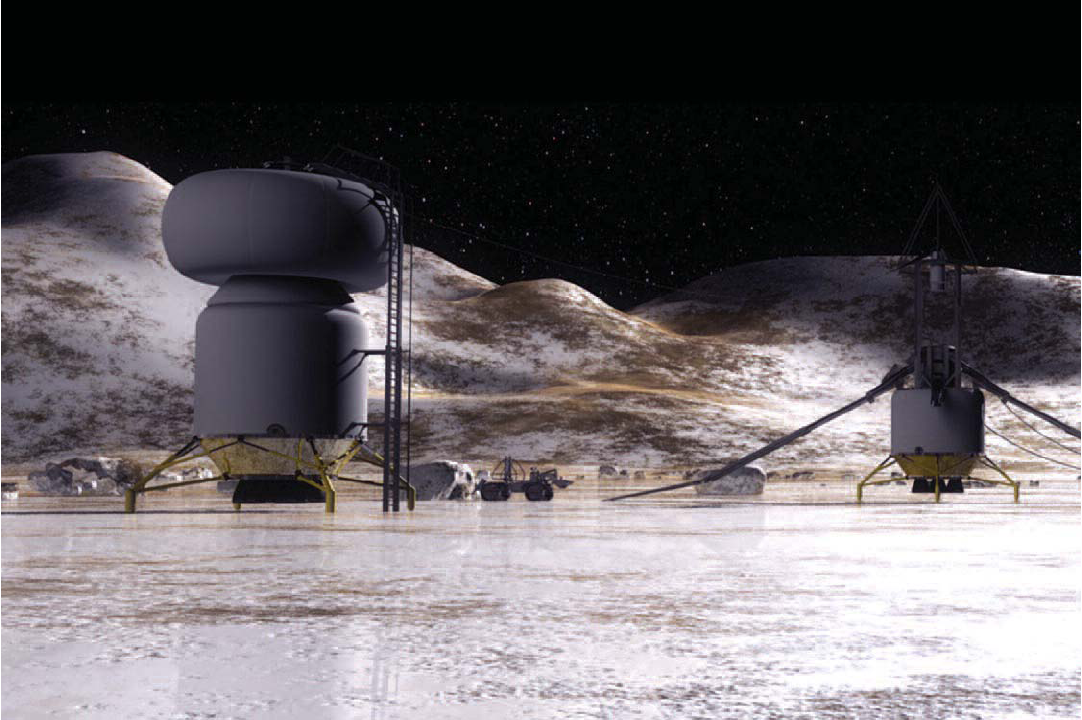
Artist's impression of a base on Callisto

Jovian radiation
Moon	rem/day
Io	3600
Europa	540
Ganymede	8
Callisto	0.01
Earth (Max)	0.07
Earth (Avg)	0.0007

The Jovian system in general has particular disadvantages for colonization, including a deep gravity well. The magnetosphere of Jupiter bombards the moons of Jupiter with intense ionizing radiation delivering about 36 Sv per day to unshielded colonists on Io and about 5.40 Sv per day on Europa. Exposure to about 0.75 Sv over a few days is enough to cause radiation poisoning, and about 5 Sv over a few days is fatal.

Jupiter itself, like the other gas giants, has further disadvantages. There is no accessible surface on which to land, and the light hydrogen atmosphere would not provide good buoyancy for some kind of aerial habitat as has been proposed for Venus.

Radiation levels on Io and Europa are extreme, enough to kill unshielded humans within an Earth day. Therefore, only Callisto and perhaps Ganymede could reasonably support a human colony. Callisto orbits outside Jupiter's radiation belt. Ganymede's low latitudes are partially shielded by the moon's magnetic field, though not enough to completely remove the need for radiation shielding. Both of them have available water, silicate rock, and metals that could be mined and used for construction.

Although Io's volcanism and tidal heating constitute valuable resources, exploiting them is probably impractical. Europa is rich in water (its subsurface ocean is expected to contain over twice as much water as all Earth's oceans together) and likely oxygen, but metals and minerals would have to be imported. If alien microbial life exists on Europa, human immune systems may not protect against it. Sufficient radiation shielding might, however, make Europa an interesting location for a research base. The private Artemis Project drafted a plan in 1997 to colonize Europa, involving surface igloos as bases to drill down into the ice and explore the ocean underneath, and suggesting that humans could live in "air pockets" in the ice layer. Ganymede and Callisto are also expected to have internal oceans. It might be possible to build a surface base that would produce fuel for further exploration of the Solar System.

In 2003, NASA performed a study called HOPE (Revolutionary Concepts for Human Outer Planet Exploration) regarding the future exploration of the Solar System. The target chosen was Callisto due to its distance from Jupiter, and thus the planet's harmful radiation. It could be possible to build a surface base that would produce fuel for further exploration of the Solar System. HOPE estimated a round trip time for a crewed mission of about 2–5 years, assuming significant progress in propulsion technologies.

Io is not ideal for colonization, due to its hostile environment. The moon is under influence of high tidal forces, causing high volcanic activity. Jupiter's strong radiation belt overshadows Io, delivering 36 Sv a day to the moon. The moon is also extremely dry. Io is the least ideal place for the colonization of the four Galilean moons. Despite this, its volcanoes could be energy resources for the other moons, which are better suited to colonization.

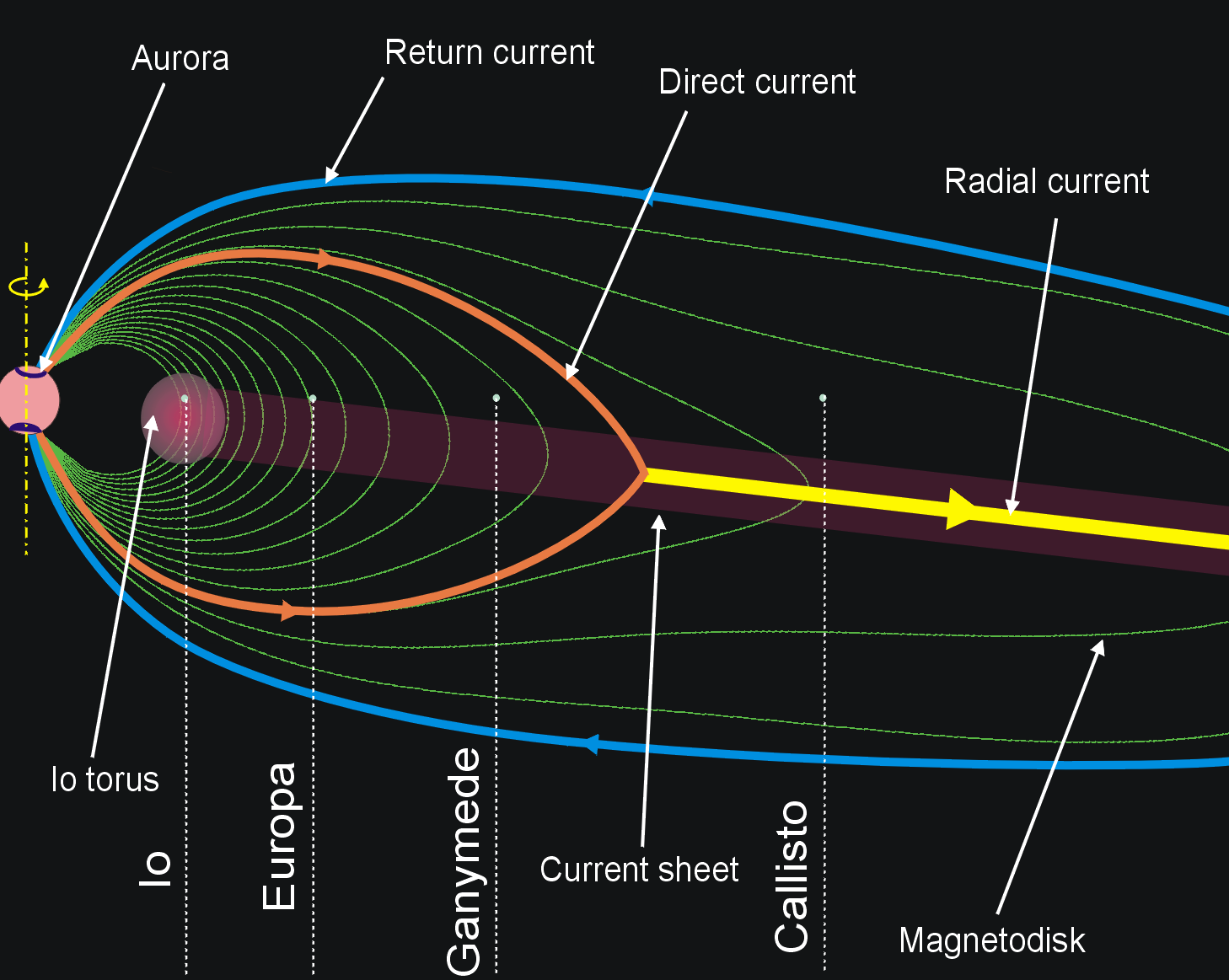
The magnetic field of Jupiter and co-rotation rotation enforcing currents

Ganymede is the largest moon in the Solar System. Ganymede is the only moon with a magnetosphere, albeit overshadowed by Jupiter's magnetic field. Because of this magnetic field, Ganymede is one of only two Jovian moons where surface settlements would be feasible because it receives about 0.08 Sv of radiation per day. Ganymede could be terraformed.

The Keck Observatory announced in 2006 that the binary Jupiter trojan 617 Patroclus, and possibly many other Jupiter trojans, are likely composed of water ice, with a layer of dust. This suggests that mining water and other volatiles in this region and transporting them elsewhere in the Solar System, perhaps via the proposed Interplanetary Transport Network, may be feasible in the not-so-distant future. This could make colonization of the Moon, Mercury and main-belt asteroids more practical.

==== Saturn ====
Saturn's radiation belt is much weaker than Jupiter's, so radiation is less of an issue here. Dione, Rhea, Titan, and Iapetus all orbit outside the radiation belt, and Titan's thick atmosphere would adequately shield against cosmic radiation.

Saturn has seven moons large enough to be round: in order of increasing distance from Saturn, they are Mimas, Enceladus, Tethys, Dione, Rhea, Titan, and Iapetus.

===== Enceladus =====
The small moon Enceladus is of interest, having a subsurface ocean that is separated from the surface by only tens of meters of ice at the south pole, compared to kilometers of ice separating the ocean from the surface on Europa. Volatile and organic compounds are present there, and the moon's high density for an ice world (1.6 g/cm^{3}) indicates that its core is rich in silicates.

On 9 March 2006, NASA's Cassini space probe found possible evidence of liquid water on Enceladus. According to that article, "pockets of liquid water may be no more than tens of meters below the surface." These findings were confirmed in 2014 by NASA. This means liquid water could be collected much more easily and safely on Enceladus than, for instance, on Europa (see above). Discovery of water, especially liquid water, generally makes a celestial body a much more likely candidate for colonization. An alternative model of Enceladus's activity is the decomposition of methane/water clathrates – a process requiring lower temperatures than liquid water eruptions. The higher density of Enceladus indicates a larger than Saturnian average silicate core that could provide materials for base operations.

===== Titan =====
Authors like Robert Zubrin have offered that Saturn is the most important and valuable of the four gas giants in the Solar System, because of its relative proximity, low radiation, and excellent system of moons. He named Titan as the best candidate on which to establish a base to exploit the resources of the Saturn system. He pointed out that Titan possesses an abundance of all the elements necessary to support life, saying "In certain ways, Titan is the most hospitable extraterrestrial world within our solar system for human colonization."

To consider a colony on Saturn's largest moon Titan, protection against the extreme cold must be a primary consideration. Titan offers a gravity of approximately 1/7 of Earth gravity, in the same range as Earth's Moon. Atmospheric pressure at the surface of the planet is about 1.5x that of the surface of the Earth; there is however, no oxygen present in the environment. The atmosphere is about 95% nitrogen and 5% methane. Some estimates suggest that abundant energy resources on Titan could power a colony with a population size of the United States.

The dense atmosphere of Titan shields the surface from radiation and would make any structural failures problematic, rather than catastrophic. With an oxygen mask and thermal clothing protection, humans could roam Titan's surface in the dim sunlight. Or, given the low gravity and dense atmosphere, they could float above it in a balloon or on personal wings.

=== Trans-Neptunian region ===
Artist's rendering of the Kuiper belt and Oort cloud.

Freeman Dyson proposed that trans-Neptunian objects, rather than planets, are the major potential habitat of life in space. Several hundred billion to trillion comet-like ice-rich bodies exist outside the orbit of Neptune, in the Kuiper belt and Inner and Outer Oort cloud. These may contain all the ingredients for life (water ice, ammonia, and carbon-rich compounds), including significant amounts of deuterium and helium-3. Since Dyson's proposal, the number of trans-Neptunian objects known has increased greatly.

=== Beyond the Solar System ===
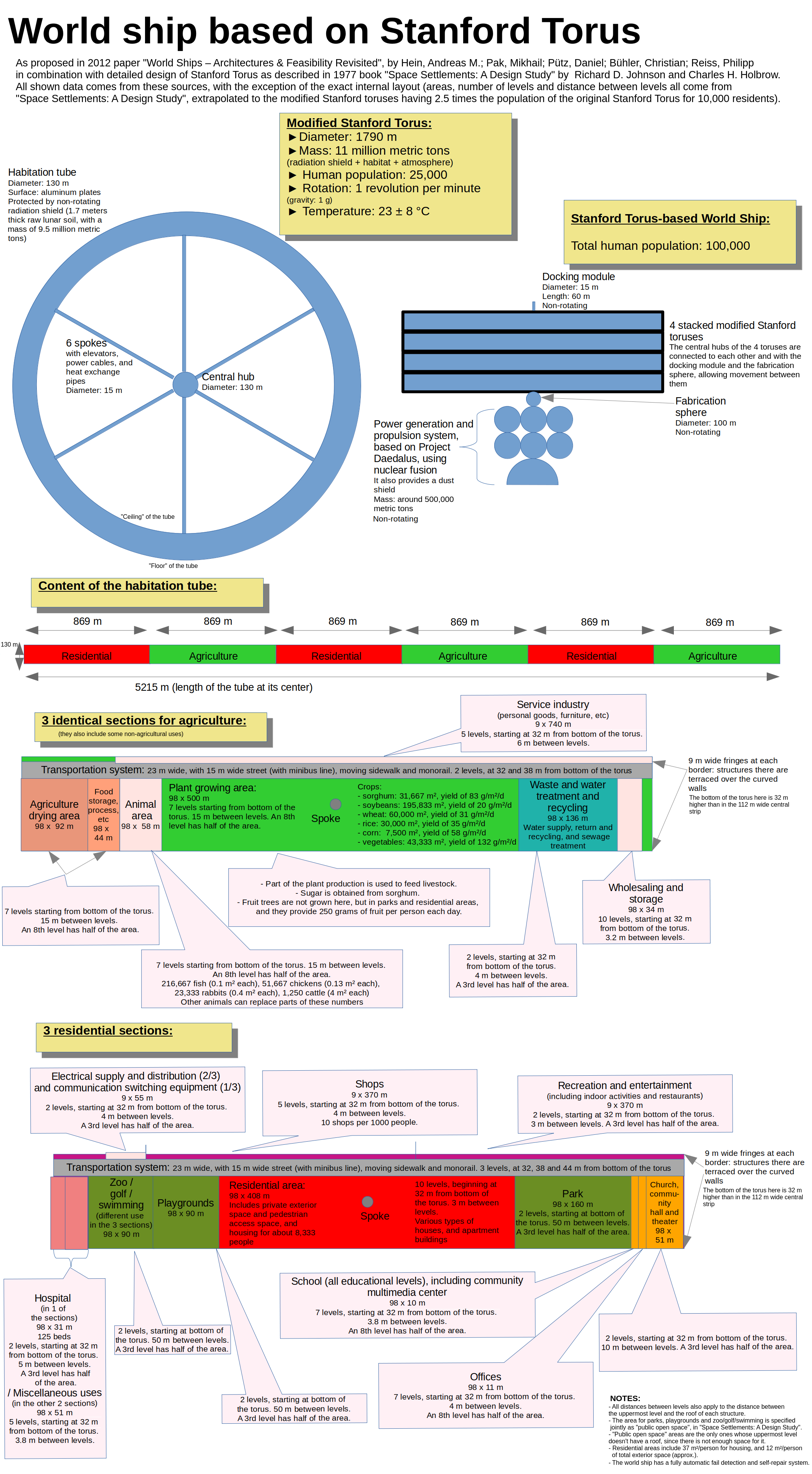
Diagram of the Stanford Torus-based world ship described in World Ships – Architectures & Feasibility Revisited paper, also considering the detailed design of Stanford Torus as described in Space Settlements: A Design Study book

Beyond the Solar System colonization targets might be identified in the surrounding stars. The main difficulty is the vast distances to other stars.

To reach such targets travel times of millennia would be necessary, with current technology. At average speeds of even 0.1% of the speed of light (c) interstellar expansion across the entire Milky Way galaxy would take up to one-half of the Sun's galactic orbital period of ~240,000,000 years, which is comparable to the timescale of other galactic processes. Due to fundamental energy and reaction mass consideration such speeds would be with current technology limited to small spaceships. If humanity would gain access to a large amount of energy, on the order of the mass-energy of entire planets, it may become possible to construct spaceships with Alcubierre drives.

The following are plausible approaches with current technology:

- A generation ship which would travel much slower than light, with consequent interstellar trip times of many decades or centuries. The crew would go through generations before the journey was complete, so none of the initial crew would be expected to survive to arrive at the destination, assuming current human lifespans.
- A sleeper ship, where most or all of the crew spend the journey in some form of hibernation or suspended animation, allowing some or all to reach the destination.
- An embryo-carrying interstellar starship (EIS), much smaller than a generation ship or sleeper ship, transporting human embryos or DNA in a frozen or dormant state to the destination. (Obvious biological and psychological problems in birthing, raising, and educating such voyagers, neglected here, may not be fundamental.)
- A ship of some kind (e.g. ion drive) powered by nuclear fusion or fission, achieving velocities of up to perhaps 10% c permitting one-way trips to nearby stars with durations comparable to a human lifetime.
- A Project Orion-ship, a nuclear-powered concept proposed by Freeman Dyson which would use nuclear explosions to propel a starship. A special case of the preceding nuclear rocket concepts, with similar potential velocity capability, but possibly easier technology.
- Laser propulsion concepts, using some form of beaming of power from the Solar System might allow a light-sail or other ship to reach high speeds, comparable to those theoretically attainable by the fusion-powered electric rocket, above. These methods would need some means, such as supplementary nuclear propulsion, to stop at the destination, but a hybrid (light-sail for acceleration, fusion-electric for deceleration) system might be possible.
- Uploaded human minds or artificial intelligence may be transmitted via radio or laser at light speed to interstellar destinations where self-replicating spacecraft have traveled subluminally and set up infrastructure and possibly also brought some minds. Extraterrestrial intelligence might be another viable destination.

==== Intergalactic travel ====
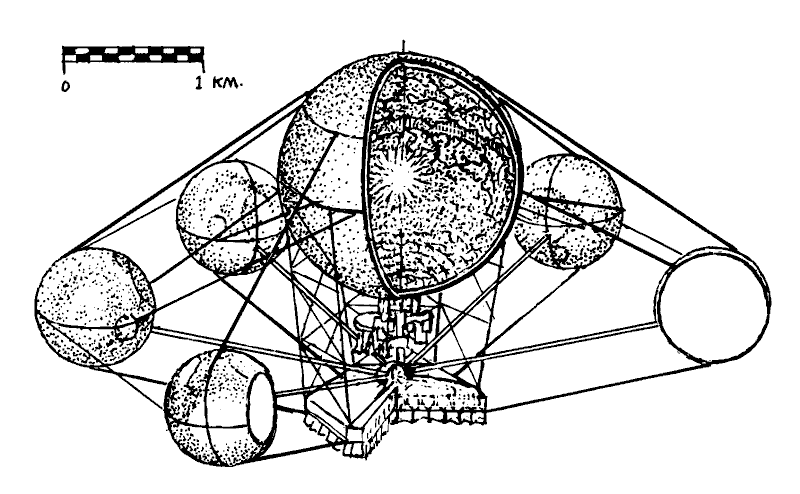
Proposed interstellar vessel based on Gerard K. O'Neill's Island One version of Bernal sphere space habitat

The distances between galaxies are on the order of a million times farther than those between the stars, and thus intergalactic colonization would involve voyages of millions of years via special self-sustaining methods.

== Implementation ==
Building colonies in space would require access to water, food, space, people, construction materials, energy, transportation, communications, life support, simulated gravity, radiation protection, migration, governance and capital investment. It is likely the colonies would be located near the necessary physical resources. The practice of space architecture seeks to transform spaceflight from a heroic test of human endurance to a normality within the bounds of comfortable experience. As is true of other frontier-opening endeavors, the capital investment necessary for space colonization would probably come from governments, an argument made by John Hickman and Neil deGrasse Tyson.

=== Life support ===
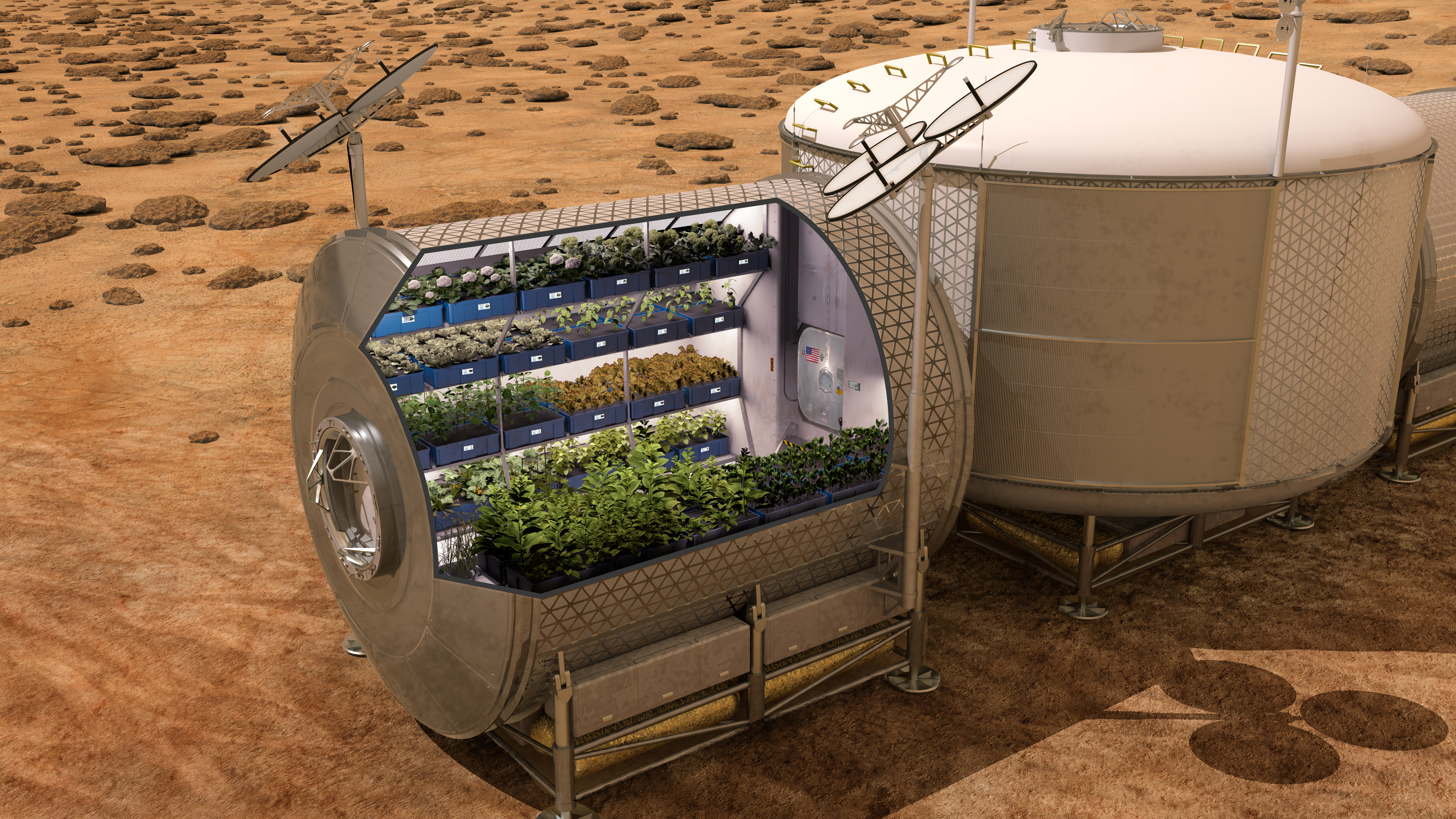
Depiction of NASA's plans to grow food on Mars

In space settlements, a life support system must recycle or import all the nutrients without "crashing." The closest terrestrial analogue to space life support is possibly that of a nuclear submarine. Nuclear submarines use mechanical life support systems to support humans for months without surfacing, and this same basic technology could presumably be employed for space use. However, nuclear submarines run "open loop"—extracting oxygen from seawater, and typically dumping carbon dioxide overboard, although they recycle existing oxygen. Another commonly proposed life-support system is a closed ecological system such as Biosphere 2.

==== Solutions to health risks ====
Although there are many physical, mental, and emotional health risks for future colonists and pioneers, solutions have been proposed to correct these problems. Mars500, HI-SEAS, and SMART-OP represent efforts to help reduce the effects of loneliness and confinement for long periods of time. Keeping contact with family members, celebrating holidays, and maintaining cultural identities all had an impact on minimizing the deterioration of mental health. There are also health tools in development to help astronauts reduce anxiety, as well as helpful tips to reduce the spread of germs and bacteria in a closed environment. Radiation risk may be reduced for astronauts by frequent monitoring and focusing work to minimize time away from shielding. Future space agencies can also ensure that every colonist would have a mandatory amount of daily exercise to prevent degradation of muscle.

==== Radiation protection ====
Cosmic rays and solar flares create a lethal radiation environment in space. In orbit around certain planets with magnetospheres (including Earth), the Van Allen belts make living above the atmosphere difficult. To protect life, settlements must be surrounded by sufficient mass to absorb most incoming radiation, unless magnetic or plasma radiation shields are developed. In the case of Van Allen belts, these could be drained using orbiting tethers or radio waves.

Passive mass shielding of four metric tons per square meter of surface area will reduce radiation dosage to several mSv or less annually, well below the rate of some populated high natural background areas on Earth. This can be leftover material (slag) from processing lunar soil and asteroids into oxygen, metals, and other useful materials. However, it represents a significant obstacle to manoeuvering vessels with such massive bulk (mobile spacecraft being particularly likely to use less massive active shielding). Inertia would necessitate powerful thrusters to start or stop rotation, or electric motors to spin two massive portions of a vessel in opposite senses. Shielding material can be stationary around a rotating interior.

==== Psychological adjustment ====
The monotony and loneliness that comes from a prolonged space mission can leave astronauts susceptible to cabin fever or having a psychotic break. Moreover, lack of sleep, fatigue, and work overload can affect an astronaut's ability to perform well in an environment such as space where every action is critical.

=== Law, governance, and sovereignty ===
A range of different models of transplanetary or extraterrestrial governance have been sketched or proposed. Often envisioning the need for a fresh or independent extraterrestrial governance, particularly in the void left by the contemporarily criticized lack of space governance and inclusivity.

It has been argued that space colonialism would, similarly to terrestrial settler colonialism, produce colonial national identities.

Federalism has been studied as a remedy of such distant and autonomous communities.

Space activity is legally based on the Outer Space Treaty, the main international treaty. But space law has become a larger legal field, which includes other international agreements such as the significantly less ratified Moon Treaty and diverse national laws.

Many articles of the Outer Space Treaty prevent the legal colonization of outer space. The Outer Space Treaty established the basic ramifications for space activity in article one: "The exploration and use of outer space, including the Moon and other celestial bodies, shall be carried out for the benefit and in the interests of all countries, irrespective of their degree of economic or scientific development, and shall be the province of all mankind." And continued in article two by stating: "Outer space, including the Moon and other celestial bodies, is not subject to national appropriation by claim of sovereignty, by means of use or occupation, or by any other means."

The development of international space law has revolved much around outer space being defined as common heritage of mankind. The Magna Carta of Space presented by William A. Hyman in 1966 framed outer space explicitly not as terra nullius but as res communis, which subsequently influenced the work of the United Nations Committee on the Peaceful Uses of Outer Space.

=== Economics ===
Space colonization can roughly be said to be possible when the necessary methods of space colonization become cheap enough (such as space access by cheaper launch systems) to meet the cumulative funds that have been gathered for the purpose, in addition to estimated profits from commercial use of space.

==== Overcoming access-to-space barriers ====
Although there are no immediate prospects for the large amounts of money required for space colonization to be available given traditional launch costs, there is some prospect of a radical reduction to launch costs in the 2010s, which would consequently lessen the cost of any efforts in that direction. With a published price of US$56.5 million per launch of up to 13,150 kg (28,990 lb) payload to low Earth orbit, SpaceX Falcon 9 rockets are already the "cheapest in the industry". Advancements currently being developed as part of the SpaceX reusable launch system development program to enable reusable Falcon 9s "could drop the price by an order of magnitude, sparking more space-based enterprise, which in turn would drop the cost of access to space still further through economies of scale." If SpaceX is successful in developing the reusable technology, it would be expected to "have a major impact on the cost of access to space", and change the increasingly competitive market in space launch services.

The President's Commission on Implementation of United States Space Exploration Policy suggested that an inducement prize should be established, perhaps by government, for the achievement of space colonization, for example by offering the prize to the first organization to place humans on the Moon and sustain them for a fixed period before they return to Earth.

==== Money and currency ====
Experts have debated on the possible use of money and currencies in societies that will be established in space. The Quasi Universal Intergalactic Denomination, or QUID, is a physical currency made from a space-qualified polymer PTFE for inter-planetary travelers. QUID was designed for the foreign exchange company Travelex by scientists from Britain's National Space Centre and the University of Leicester. Other possibilities include the incorporation of cryptocurrency as the primary form of currency, as suggested by Elon Musk.

==== Socio-economic issues ====
Human spaceflight has enabled only temporarily relocating a few privileged people and no permanent space migrants.

The societal motivation for space migration has been questioned as rooted in colonialism, questioning the fundamentals and inclusivity of space colonization.

=== Resources ===
==== Raw materials ====
Colonies on the Moon, Mars, asteroids, or the metal-rich planet Mercury, could extract local materials. The Moon is deficient in volatiles such as argon, helium and compounds of carbon, hydrogen and nitrogen. The LCROSS impacter was targeted at the Cabeus crater, which was chosen as having a high concentration of water for the Moon. A plume of material erupted in which some water was detected. Mission chief scientist Anthony Colaprete estimated that the Cabeus crater contains material with 1% water or possibly more. Water ice should also be in other permanently shadowed craters near the lunar poles. Although helium is present only in low concentrations on the Moon, where it is deposited into regolith by the solar wind, an estimated million tons of He-3 exists over all. It also has industrially significant oxygen, silicon, and metals such as iron, aluminium, and titanium.

Launching materials from Earth is expensive, so bulk materials for colonies could come from the Moon, a near-Earth object (NEO), Phobos, or Deimos. The benefits of using such sources include: a lower gravitational force, no atmospheric drag on cargo vessels, and no biosphere to damage. Many NEOs contain substantial amounts of metals. Underneath a drier outer crust (much like oil shale), some other NEOs are inactive comets which include billions of tons of water ice and kerogen hydrocarbons, as well as some nitrogen compounds.

Farther out, Jupiter's Trojan asteroids are thought to be rich in water ice and other volatiles.

Recycling of some raw materials would almost certainly be necessary.

==== Energy ====
Solar energy in orbit is abundant, reliable, and is commonly used to power satellites today. There is no night in free space, and no clouds or atmosphere to block sunlight. Light intensity obeys an inverse-square law. Hence, the solar energy available at distance d from the Sun is E = 1367/d^{2} W/m^{2}, where d is measured in astronomical units (AU) and 1367 watts/m^{2} is the energy available at the distance of Earth's orbit from the Sun, 1 AU.

In the weightlessness and vacuum of space, high temperatures for industrial processes can easily be achieved in solar ovens with huge parabolic reflectors made of metallic foil with very lightweight support structures. Flat mirrors to reflect sunlight around radiation shields into living areas (to avoid line-of-sight access for cosmic rays, or to make the Sun's image appear to move across their "sky") or onto crops are even lighter and easier to build.

Large solar power photovoltaic cell arrays or thermal power plants would be needed to meet the electrical power needs of the settlers' use. In developed parts of Earth, electrical consumption can average 1 kilowatt/person (or roughly 10 megawatt-hours per person per year.) These power plants could be at a short distance from the main structures if wires are used to transmit the power, or much farther away with wireless power transmission.

A major export of the initial space settlement designs was anticipated to be large solar power satellites (SPS) that would use wireless power transmission (phase-locked microwave beams or lasers emitting wavelengths that special solar cells convert with high efficiency) to send power to locations on Earth, or to colonies on the Moon or other locations in space. For locations on Earth, this method of getting power is extremely benign, with zero emissions and far less ground area required per watt than for conventional solar panels. Once these satellites are primarily built from lunar or asteroid-derived materials, the price of SPS electricity could be lower than energy from fossil fuel or nuclear energy; replacing these would have significant benefits such as the elimination of greenhouse gases and nuclear waste from electricity generation.

Transmitting solar energy wirelessly from the Earth to the Moon and back is also an idea proposed for the benefit of space colonization and energy resources. Physicist Dr. David Criswell, who worked for NASA during the Apollo missions, proposed the idea of using power beams to transfer energy from space. These beams, microwaves with a wavelength of about 12 cm, would be almost untouched as they travel through the atmosphere. They could also be aimed at more industrial areas to keep away from humans or animal activities. This would allow for safer and more reliable methods of transferring solar energy.

In 2008, scientists were able to send a 20 watt microwave signal from a mountain on the island of Maui to the island of Hawaii. Since then JAXA and Mitsubishi have been working together on a $21 billion project to place satellites in orbit which could generate up to 1 gigawatt of energy. These are the next advancements being done today to transmit energy wirelessly for space-based solar energy.

However, the value of SPS power delivered wirelessly to other locations in space will typically be far higher than to Earth. Otherwise, the means of generating the power would need to be included with these projects and pay the heavy penalty of Earth launch costs. Therefore, other than proposed demonstration projects for power delivered to Earth, the first priority for SPS electricity is likely to be locations in space, such as communications satellites, fuel depots or "orbital tugboat" boosters transferring cargo and passengers between low Earth orbit (LEO) and other orbits such as geosynchronous orbit (GEO), lunar orbit or highly-eccentric Earth orbit (HEEO). The system will also rely on satellites and receiving stations on Earth to convert the energy into electricity. Because this energy can be transmitted easily from dayside to nightside, power would be reliable 24/7.

Nuclear power is sometimes proposed for colonies located on the Moon or on Mars, as the supply of solar energy is too discontinuous in these locations; the Moon has nights of two Earth weeks in duration. Mars has nights, relatively high gravity, and an atmosphere featuring large dust storms to cover and degrade solar panels. Also, Mars' greater distance from the Sun (1.52 astronomical units, AU) means that only 1/1.52^{2} or about 43% of the solar energy is available at Mars compared with Earth orbit. Another method would be transmitting energy wirelessly to the lunar or Martian colonies from solar power satellites (SPSs) as described above; the difficulties of generating power in these locations make the relative advantages of SPSs much greater there than for power beamed to locations on Earth. In order to also be able to fulfill the requirements of a Moon base and energy to supply life support, maintenance, communications, and research, a combination of both nuclear and solar energy may be used in the first colonies.

For both solar thermal and nuclear power generation in airless environments, such as the Moon and space, and to a lesser extent the very thin Martian atmosphere, one of the main difficulties is dispersing the inevitable heat generated. This requires fairly large radiator areas.

=== Self-sustainment ===
==== In situ manufacturing ====
Space manufacturing could enable self-replication. Some consider it the ultimate goal because it would allow an exponential increase in colonies, while eliminating costs to, and dependence on, Earth. It could be argued that the establishment of such a colony would be Earth's first act of self-replication. Intermediate goals include colonies that expect only information from Earth (science, engineering, entertainment) and colonies that just require periodic supply of lightweight objects, such as integrated circuits, medicines, genetic material and tools.

==== Sustaining a population ====
In 2002, the anthropologist John H. Moore estimated that a population of 150–180 would permit a stable society to exist for 60 to 80 generations—equivalent to 2,000 years.

Assuming a journey of 6,300 years, the astrophysicist Frédéric Marin and the particle physicist Camille Beluffi calculated that the minimum viable population for a generation ship to reach Proxima Centauri would be 98 settlers at the beginning of the mission (then the crew will breed until reaching a stable population of several hundred settlers within the ship).

In 2020, Jean-Marc Salotti proposed a method to determine the minimum number of settlers to survive on an extraterrestrial world. It is based on the comparison between the required time to perform all activities and the working time of all human resources. For Mars, 110 individuals would be required.

== Advocacy ==
Several private companies have announced plans toward the colonization of Mars. Among entrepreneurs leading the call for space colonization are Elon Musk, Dennis Tito and Bas Lansdorp.

=== Involved organizations ===
Organizations that advocate for space colonization include:

- Blue Origin and Jeff Bezos are pursuing plans for space colonization starting with a base on the moon. Blue Origin is developing the New Glenn launcher to significantly reduce access to space cost with use of a re-useable booster and is building the Blue Moon lunar lander.
- The Mars Society promotes Robert Zubrin's Mars Direct plan and the settlement of Mars.
- The National Space Society (NSS) is an organization with the vision of people living and working in thriving communities beyond the Earth. The NSS also maintains an extensive library of full-text articles and books on space settlement.
- The Space Frontier Foundation performs space advocacy including strong free market, capitalist views about space development.
- The Space Settlement Institute is searching for ways to make space colonization happen within a lifetime.
- SpaceX is developing extensive spaceflight transportation infrastructure with the express purpose of enabling long-term human settlement of Mars.
- The Space Studies Institute funds the study of outer space settlements, especially O'Neill cylinders.
- The Alliance to Rescue Civilization plans to establish backups of human civilization on the Moon and other locations away from Earth.
- The British Interplanetary Society (BIS) promotes ideas for the exploration and use of space, including a Mars colony, future propulsion systems (see Project Daedalus), terraforming, and locating other habitable worlds. In June 2013 the BIS began the SPACE project to re-examine Gerard O'Neill's 1970s space colony studies in light of the advances made since then. The progress of this effort were detailed in a special edition of the BIS journal in September 2019.
- Asgardia (nation) – an organization seeking to circumvent limitations placed by Outer Space Treaty.
- The Cyprus Space Exploration Organisation promotes space exploration and colonization, and fosters collaboration in space.

=== Experiments with terrestrial analogues ===
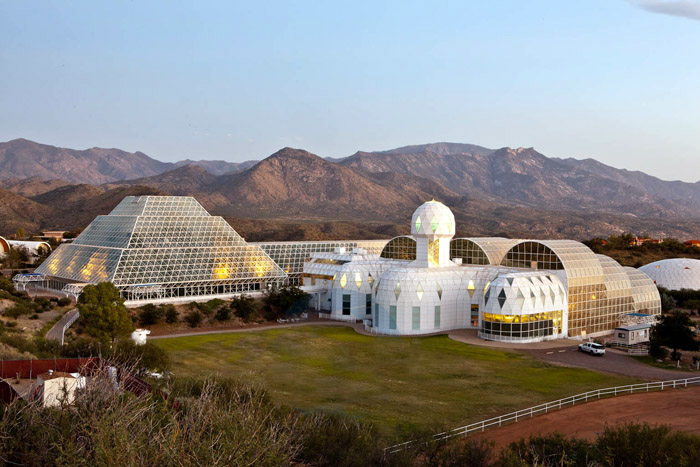
Biosphere 2 is a test habitat on Earth for space flight.

Many space agencies build "testbeds", which are facilities on Earth for testing advanced life support systems, but these are designed for long duration human spaceflight, not permanent colonization.

- The most famous attempt to build an analogue to a self-sufficient settlement is Biosphere 2, which attempted to duplicate Earth's biosphere.
- BIOS-3 is another closed ecosystem, completed in 1972 in Krasnoyarsk, Siberia.
- The Mars Desert Research Station has a habitat for similar reasons, but the surrounding climate is not strictly inhospitable.
- Devon Island Mars Arctic Research Station, can also provide some practice for off-world outpost construction and operation.

== Influence of science fiction ==
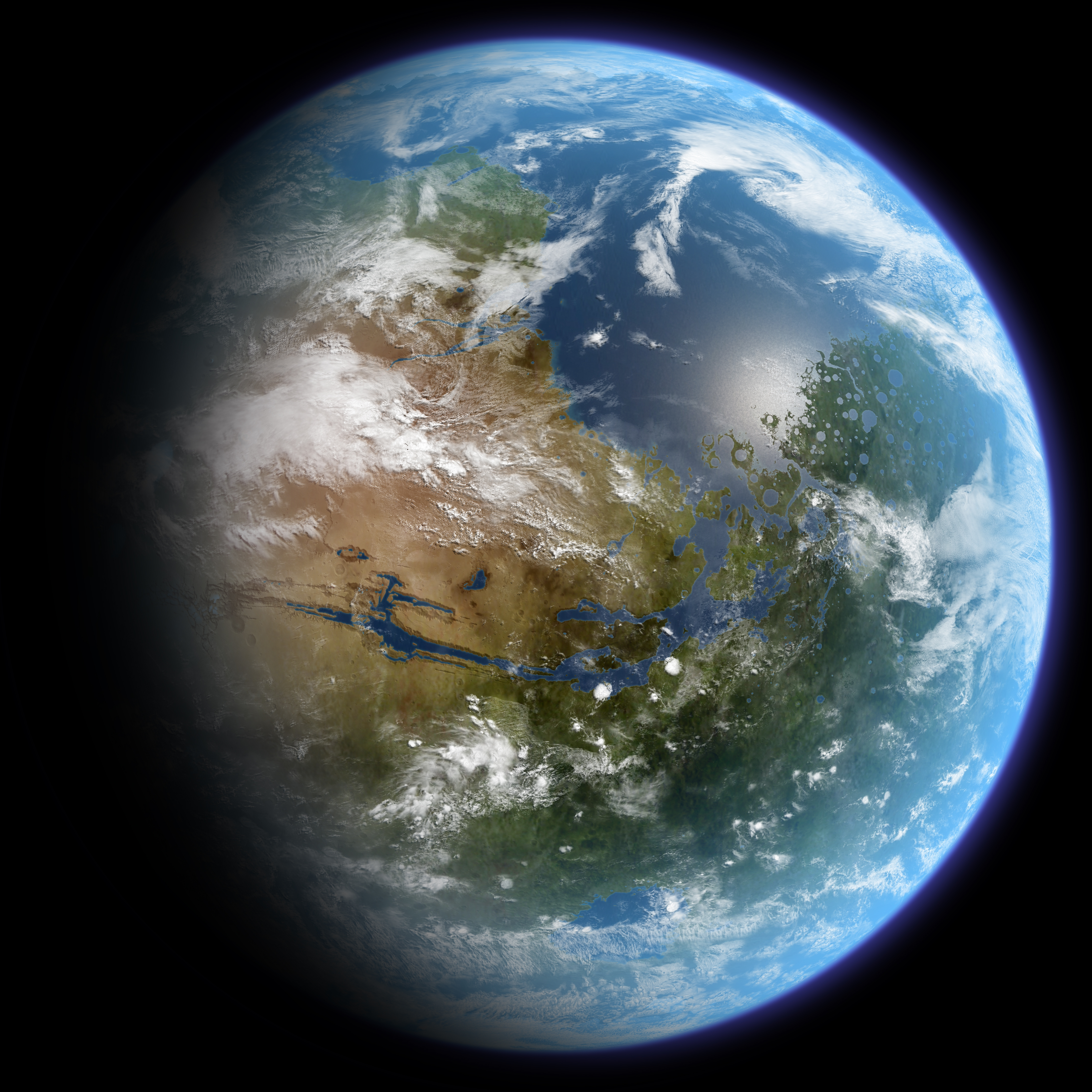
An artist's view of a terraformed Mars centered on Valles Marineris. Tharsis is visible on the left side. This transformation was imagined in science fiction author Kim Stanley Robinson's Mars Trilogy but also studied by scientists including Robert Zubrin. Robinson and Zubrin are both members of the Mars Society.

Space colonization is a recurring theme in science fiction. NASA began to assess space colonization issues as early as 1975 with their Space Settlements Design Study. The report directly acknowledges the foundation of various ideas for colonization in science fiction. It quotes author Robert Salkeld and highlights the role of the precursors of science fiction alongside the founders of astronautics, where for example Jules Verne rubs shoulders with Constantin Tsiolkovsky.

Indeed, colonization as a fictional theme and colonization as a research project are not independent. Research feeds fiction and fiction sometimes inspires research. Many of the most fascinating ideas in science originated not in the laboratory but in the minds of such science fiction writers as Arthur C. Clarke and Ray Bradbury. Clarke's 1945 article on communications satellites was the original idea behind modern communications satellites. Bradbury's The Martian Chronicles explores the exploration and settlement of Mars and has been attributed as the main inspiration behind NASA's many missions to Mars. Communicators and tricorders from the science fiction of Star Trek are said to be inspirations for cell phones and wireless medical triage devices. Fiction inspired innovation and invention to develop new technologies. Communications, governance principles, and advanced technological devices, all speculated by science fiction, are all precursors to survival of an extraterrestrial colony. The European Space Agency ITSF project (Innovative Technologies in Science Fiction for Space Applications) study offers similar consideration for the cross-fertilization between fiction and science.

Science fiction writer Norman Spinrad highlights the role of science fiction as a visionary force that spawned the conquest of space, a term he believes betrays its imperialist tendencies, and the colonization of space. He also shows that political scientist and science fiction writer Jerry Pournelle, in wanting to revive the conquest of space for this purpose in the early 1980s, actually launched the Reagan administration's Strategic Defense Initiative project, which he considers a failure, because instead of the military program reviving the space program, the opposite happens: the $40 billion cost of the program is actually taken away from the construction of a base on the Moon.

One of the great names in science fiction, Arthur C. Clarke, a supporter of Marshall Savage's ideas, announced in a 2001 article, the date appearing in one of his most famous titles 2001: A Space Odyssey, that by 2057 there would be humans on the Moon, Mars , Europa, Ganymede, Titan and in orbit around Venus, Neptune and Pluto. Contemporary science fiction has extended the colonization vision further. The TV series The Expanse which is based on a series of novels of the same name by James S. A. Corey, addresses the politics and conflict of humanity hundreds of years in the future after it has colonized the solar system and Mars has become an independent military power. In Theresa Hutchin's essay on the series in 2021, comparisons are drawn between the fiction of the story and the reality of current corporate led development of space exploration activities.

== See also ==
- Arcology
- Billionaire space race
- Colonisation (biology)
- Colonization of Antarctica
- Directed panspermia
- Domed city
- Human presence in space
- Mars to Stay
- Megastructure
- NewSpace
- MELiSSA
- Ocean colonization
- Planetary habitability
- Solar analog
- Space archaeology
- Politics of outer space
- Spome
- Stanford torus
- Timeline of Solar System exploration
- Underground city
