= Deep Black =

Deep Black may refer to:

- Deep Black (book), a 1986 book by William E. Burrows
- Deep Black (video game), a 2012 third-person shooter
- Deep Black, a 2004 Nick Stone Missions novel by Andy McNab
- Deep Black, a book and series by Stephen Coonts and Jim DeFelice

== See also ==
- Black (disambiguation)
- Tiefschwarz (English: Deep black), a German tech house music duo
