= Moon Society =

Space advocacy organization

Logo

The Moon Society is a space advocacy organization, founded in 2000, and dedicated to promoting large-scale human exploration, research, and settlement of the Moon.

== Objectives ==
The objectives of the Society are:

- The creation of a spacefaring civilization which will establish communities on the Moon; promotion of large-scale industrialization and private enterprise on the Moon;
- The promotion of interest in the exploration, research, development, and habitation of the Moon, through the media of conferences, the press, library and museum exhibits, and other literary and educational means;
- The support, by funding or otherwise, of scholarships, libraries, museums and other means of encouraging the study of the Moon and related technologies;
- The stimulation of the advancement and development of applications of space and related technologies, encouragement of entrepreneurial development thereof, and promote technology transfer from space to Earth;
- The bringing together of persons from government, industry, educational institutions, universities, the public press, and other walks of life for the exchange of information about the Moon;
- Promoting collaboration between various societies and groups interested in developing and utilizing the Moon;
- Informing the public at large on matters related to the Moon, and;
- The provision of suitable recognition and honor to individuals and organizations which have contributed to the advancement of the space exploration, research, development, and habitation of the Moon, as well as scientific and technological developments related thereto.

Despite being a non-profit organization, the Moon Society has a strong emphasis on lunar mining, tourism, and other commercial activities. It plans to design and implement the first privately funded and operated lunar base, calling the effort "Artemis Project'.

The Moon Society operates on a basis of educational outreach, friendly cooperation, and collaboration with other space advocacy groups. On May 22, 2005, it became an autonomous affiliate of the National Space Society. Also, the Moon Society has cooperated on a number of fronts with the Mars Society, despite the latter's official and grassroots culture, which tends to view the Moon as a distraction from Mars.

== Artemis Moonbase Simulation 1 ==
The Moon Society held its first simulation exercise at the Mars Desert Research Station (MDRS) from February 25 to March 12, 2006. Eight researchers conducted projects aimed at learning about human factors issues related to a Moon mission.

== Affiliated publication ==
The Moon Miners' Manifesto which is provided with membership by the Moon Society has covered topics such as fresh space suit concepts, how Lunar everdark craters can prep us for expeditions to the outer Solar system and waypoints between here and destination Moon.

== See also ==
- Space advocacy
- Space colonization
- Space exploration
- Vision for Space Exploration
