= William E. Burrows =

American author and journalism professor emeritus

- Born: March 27, 1937; Harrisburg, Pennsylvania, U.S.
- Died: June 29, 2024 (aged 87); Bridgeport, Connecticut, U.S.
- Occupations: Journalist, educator, author
- Years active: 1962–2024
- Title: Assistant professor of journalism, 1974–2024
- Spouse: Joelle Hodgson (m. 1866; div. 2005)
- Children: Lara Julie

Academic background
- Education: BA 1960, MA 1962
- Alma mater: Columbia University

Academic work
- Discipline: Journalism
- Sub-discipline: Science, Health, and Environment

William Eli Burrows (March 27, 1937 – June 29, 2024) was an American author and journalism professor. Born in Harrisburg, Pennsylvania, he was educated at Columbia University and became assistant professor of journalism in 1974.

== Life ==
Burrows grew up in Rego Park, New York, and graduated from Forest Hills High School. He held a BA and an MA from Columbia University.

He worked as a reporter for newspapers such as The New York Times, The Washington Post, Foreign Affairs, and The Wall Street Journal. In 1970, he moved to Mallorca, Spain, where he worked as a travel writer. He moved back to the United States in 1974 and joined the Journalism department at New York University. He was tenured in 1981. In 1983, he founded The Science and Environmental Reporting Program (SERP) of New York University.

Burrows specialized in space and national security issues and his latest book is The Asteroid Threat. He published Deep Black, a seminal work on reconnaissance and espionage in 1986.

He was the co-founder of the Alliance to Rescue Civilization. He was also director emeritus of the Science, Health, and Environmental Reporting Program at New York University. He is the author of twelve books and numerous articles in The New York Times, The Washington Post, The Wall Street Journal, The Richmond Times-Dispatch, Foreign Affairs, Harvard Magazine, Harper's and other publications. His most recent book, The Asteroid Threat: Defending Our Planet From Deadly Near-Earth Objects, was published on June 10, 2014. Burrows was the only non-scientist on the National Research Council's Near-Earth Object Survey and Detection Panel. In recognition of his distinguished career and expertise, a main belt asteroid has been named after him, and he is a recipient of the American Astronautical Society John F. Kennedy Astronautics Award, among other honors.

Burrows married Joelle Hodgson in 1966, and divorced in 2005. They have one daughter, Lara Julie, a physician. He died from kidney failure in Bridgeport, Connecticut, on June 29, 2024, at the age of 87.

== Works ==
- Richthofen: A True History of the Red Baron, Harcourt, Brace & World, 1969.
- Vigilante, Harcourt Brace Jovanovich, 1976, ISBN 9780151936557
- On Reporting the News, New York: New York University Press, 1977.
- Deep Black, Berkley Books, 1988, ISBN 9780425108796
- Exploring Space: Voyages in the Solar System and Beyond, Random House, 1990, ISBN 9780394569833
- Mission to Deep Space, New York: W. H. Freeman/Scientific American, 1993.
- William E. Burrows, Robert Windrem, Critical Mass: The Dangerous Race for Superweapons in a Fragmenting World, Simon and Schuster, 1994, ISBN 9780671748951
- The Infinite Journey, New York: Discovery Books, 2000
- By Any Means Necessary: America's Secret Air War, Arrow, 2003, ISBN 9780099436256
- The Survival Imperative: Using Space to Protect Earth. Tom Doherty Associates. 10 July 2007. ISBN 978-0-7653-1115-3.
- This New Ocean: The Story of the First Space Age. Random House Publishing Group. 29 September 2010. ISBN 978-0-307-76548-2.
- The Asteroid Threat: Defending Our Planet From Deadly Near-Earth Objects, Prometheus Books, 2014, ISBN 978-1-61614-913-0

== Legacy ==
Asteroid 9930 Billburrows was named for him.
