= Artemis Project =

Private spaceflight and entertainment venture from the 1990s

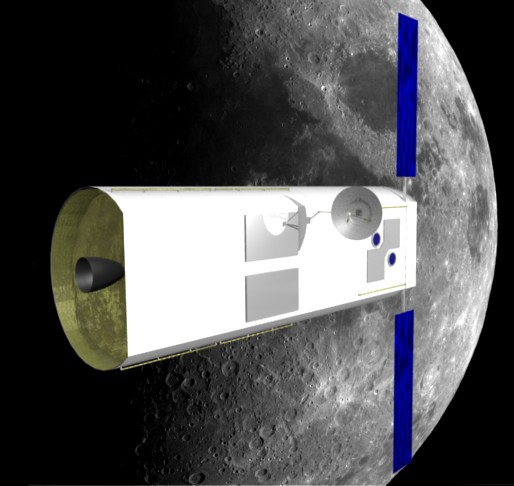
- Rendered image of the Lunar Transfer Vehicle en route from the Earth to the Moon
- Commercial?: Yes
- Type of project: Private spacecraft venture
- Products: A permanent, self-supporting base on the Moon
- Founder: The Lunar Resources Company
- Established: 1994
- Website: Artemis Society Official website

The Artemis Project was a private spaceflight venture to establish a permanent, self-supporting base on the Moon by 2002. It was named after Artemis, the goddess of the hunt, in some myths the moon, and twin sister of Apollo (a reference to the Apollo project). The project's creators, the Lunar Resources Company, formed the Artemis Society as a non-profit NGO in 1994. They planned to cover the costs by exploiting the entertainment value in creating a lunar colony. They also believed that their costs would be a small fraction of what a government agency, such as NASA, would have spent.

The project studied other space colonization projects as well, including colonies on outer planet moons.

== Overview ==
The Reference Mission was designed to provide enough infrastructure to create a small lunar base. No flight hardware was built.

=== Mission hardware ===
==== Lunar transfer vehicle ====
The Lunar transfer Vehicle concept consisted of a single Spacehab module with communications equipment, Solar panels and an added booster stage. The Lunar Transfer Vehicle would have carried the crew as they travel from the Earth to the Moon. It would have been left in Lunar orbit as the crew descend to the lunar surface.

==== Lunar base habitat ====
The lunar habitat concept consisted of three Spacehab modules and a descent stage. It also would have contained other equipment such as solar panels, radiators and communications equipment.

==== Ascent stage ====
The ascent stage concept was to have been used by the crew to return to a lunar orbit from the surface of the Moon. Unlike the Lunar Module of the Apollo Program, the ascent stage was not to have maintained a breathable atmosphere. Because of this, a protective space suit would have to be worn throughout the flight to protect the astronaut from the harsh conditions of space.

=== Mission profile ===
The main mission hardware components would have been assembled in a low Earth orbit. Then the stack would have boosted to a lunar orbit. The astronauts would have transferred from the lunar transfer vehicle to the ascent stage. After a deorbit and braking burn, the lunar base habitat and the ascent stage would have been landed on the lunar surface. Following this, the crew would have unpacked and set up the new lunar base for future operations. Once the lunar operations were completed, the crew was to transfer to the ascent stage, where they were to enter into a lunar orbit and dock with the lunar transfer vehicle where they would have remained for the journey back to Earth.

== Future plans ==
Once a base had been built on the Moon it was intended that a lunar hotel would have been established. However it is not known how economically feasible this would have been because low-cost access to space (possibly involving single-stage-to-orbit or two-stage-to-orbit vehicles) had yet to be developed.

== See also ==
- Colonization of the Moon
- Moon Society
