= Deep Black (book) =

Deep Black: Space Espionage and National Security
- Author: William E. Burrows
- Language: American English
- Subject: Espionage; National Security
- Genre: non-fiction
- Publisher: Random House (1st Ed.); Berkley Books (2nd Ed.)
- Publication date: 1986 (1st Ed.); 1988 (2nd Ed.)
- Publication place: United States
- Media type: Print (Hardcover, Paperback)
- Pages: 401
- ISBN: 0-394-54124-3
- Dewey Decimal: 358.8
- LC Class: UG475 .B87 1986

Deep Black: Space Espionage and National Security is a 1986 non-fiction book written by American journalist and author William E. Burrows. The book is promoted with the tagline "The Startling Truth Behind America's Top Secret Spy Satellites" on the covers of the second (first paperback) and subsequent editions.

== Synopsis ==
Deep Black recounts the United States' clandestine intelligence, surveillance and reconnaissance (ISR) program from its inception at the start of the Cold War up to the mid-1980s. Burrows concentrates on aspects of the program which use technical means of collecting intelligence by employing strategic aircraft, satellites and other electronic techniques instead of more traditional espionage activities. Additionally, the work details how the program adapts from, or is directly related to seminal events of the era such as early Soviet successes in their space program, the Cuban Missile Crisis, the downing of Korean Air Lines Flight 007 and the Space Shuttle Challenger disaster while framing the intragovernmental competition among organizations of the US Intelligence Community (IC) for tax dollars, equipment and influence.

== Title ==
The title is a reference to the IC jargon term "black", indicating something which is highly classified such as a black budget which is used to finance black ops and/or black projects, all of these are discussed in the book. Thus, "Deep Black" alludes that the subject and the material inside are profoundly sensitive in nature.

== Reception ==
Foreign Affairs described the book as thick and the information overwhelming, concluding that the piece was germane "to more analytically oriented scholars".

In The New York Times, John Newhouse gives a generally favorable review of Deep Black while taking nuanced exception to Burrows’ depiction of the Sputnik launch as "the most pernicious problem" of the Eisenhower White House. The review called the book "very revealing ... More remarkable than exploits of human spies".

Stars and Stripes wrote "Deep Black is vital reading for anyone concerned with the national security of the United States".

== See also ==
- Anti-Ballistic Missile Treaty (ABMT)
- Anti-Satellite (ASAT) weapon
- Central Intelligence Agency (CIA)
- Corona (satellite)
- Lockheed U-2
- Missile Defense Alarm System (MIDAS)
- National Photographic Interpretation Center (NPIC)
- National Reconnaissance Office (NRO)
- National Technical Means (NTM) of verification
- National Security Agency (NSA)
- Project Oxcart
- RC-135
- Satellite And Missile Observation System (SAMOS)
- Skunk Works
- Sound Surveillance System (SOSUS)
- Strategic Air Command (SAC)
- The Puzzle Palace
- Treaty on Open Skies
