= Alliance to Rescue Civilization =

The Alliance to Rescue Civilization was an organization devoted to the establishment of an off-Earth "backup" of human civilization. This facility, or group of facilities, would serve to repopulate the Earth after a worldwide disaster or war, preserving as much as possible both the sciences and the arts. The organization had called for such a backup facility to be built on the Moon in lieu of NASA's plan to return there no earlier than 2026.

It was founded by the author and journalist William E. Burrows and the biochemist Robert Shapiro. The organization was absorbed into the Lifeboat Foundation in 2007.
