= Robert Shapiro (chemist) =

American scientist and academic

- Born: November 28, 1935; New York City, United States
- Died: June 15, 2011 (aged 75)
- Education: City College of New York (BS), Harvard University (PhD)
- Known for: Work on origin of life
- Awards: Trotter Prize (2004) with Paul Davies
- Scientific career
- Fields: Chemistry
- Workplaces: University of Cambridge, New York University
- Doctoral advisor: Robert B. Woodward

Robert Shapiro (28 November 1935 – 15 June 2011) was professor emeritus of chemistry at New York University. He is best known for his work on the origin of life, having written two books on the topic: Origins, a Skeptic’s Guide to the Creation of Life on Earth (1986) and Planetary Dreams (1999). He opposed the RNA world hypothesis, and held that the spontaneous emergence of a molecule as complicated as RNA is highly unlikely. Instead, he proposed that life arose from some self-sustaining and compartmentalized reaction of simple molecules: "metabolism first" instead of "RNA first". This reaction would have to be able to reproduce and evolve, eventually leading to RNA. He claimed that in this view life is a normal consequence of the laws of nature and potentially quite common in the universe.

== Works ==
- Life Beyond Earth: The Intelligent Earthling's Guide to Extraterrestrial Life (with Gerald Feinberg) Morrow, 1980. ISBN 0-688-08642-X.
- Origins: A Skeptic's Guide to the Creation of Life on Earth Summit Books (January 1986) ISBN 0-671-45939-2.
- Planetary Dreams: The Quest to Discover Life Beyond Earth Wiley; 1 edition (1999) ISBN 0471407356.
