= Coalition for Deep Space Exploration =

US space advocacy organisation

The Coalition for Deep Space Exploration logo, courtesy of the CDSE

The Coalition for Deep Space Exploration is a United States space advocacy organization for space industry businesses and non-profit groups supporting continued government investment in space exploration.

== Presidents and CEOs ==
- Mary Lynne Dittmar, founder, 2015–2021
- Frank Slazer, 2021–2023
- Allen Cutler, 2023–present

== Founding Members ==
Members:

- Aerojet Rocketdyne, an L3Harris Technologies Company
- Jacobs Solutions
- Boeing
- Lockheed Martin
- Northrop Grumman

== Partner Associations ==
Partners:

- Challenger Center for Space Science Education
- Citizens for Space Exploration
- National Space Society

== Board of Advisors ==
The circa 2015 Board of Advisors:

- Penelope J. Boston, Ph.D. – speleologist
- Bob Crippen – former Shuttle astronaut
- Frederick D. Gregory - former Shuttle astronaut
- Gerry Griffin – former NASA flight director and former NASA Deputy Administrator
- Wayne Hale - former Space Shuttle Program Manager and former Space Shuttle Flight Director
- Bernard Harris – former Shuttle astronaut and first African American to walk in space
- Steven Hawley - former Shuttle astronaut
- Henry R. Hertzfeld - former senior economist and policy analyst at NASA
- Thomas David Jones - former Shuttle astronaut
- Nick Lampson - former Congressman from Texas' 22nd Congressional District
- Paul Spudis - geologist and lunar scientist
- Doug Cooke - former NASA Associate Administrator
- Dan Dumbacher] - former NASA Deputy Associate Administrator

== Honorary Board Members ==
Honorees:

- Jake Garn – first member of Congress to fly in space (former U.S. Senator from Utah)
- Joseph Kerwin – former Skylab astronaut
- Gene Kranz – former Apollo flight director
- Jim Lovell - former NASA Astronaut and commander of the Apollo 13 mission

== See also ==
- Space Exploration
- List of astronomical societies
- NASA
