= Indian Astronaut Corps =

Scientists of the space agency of India

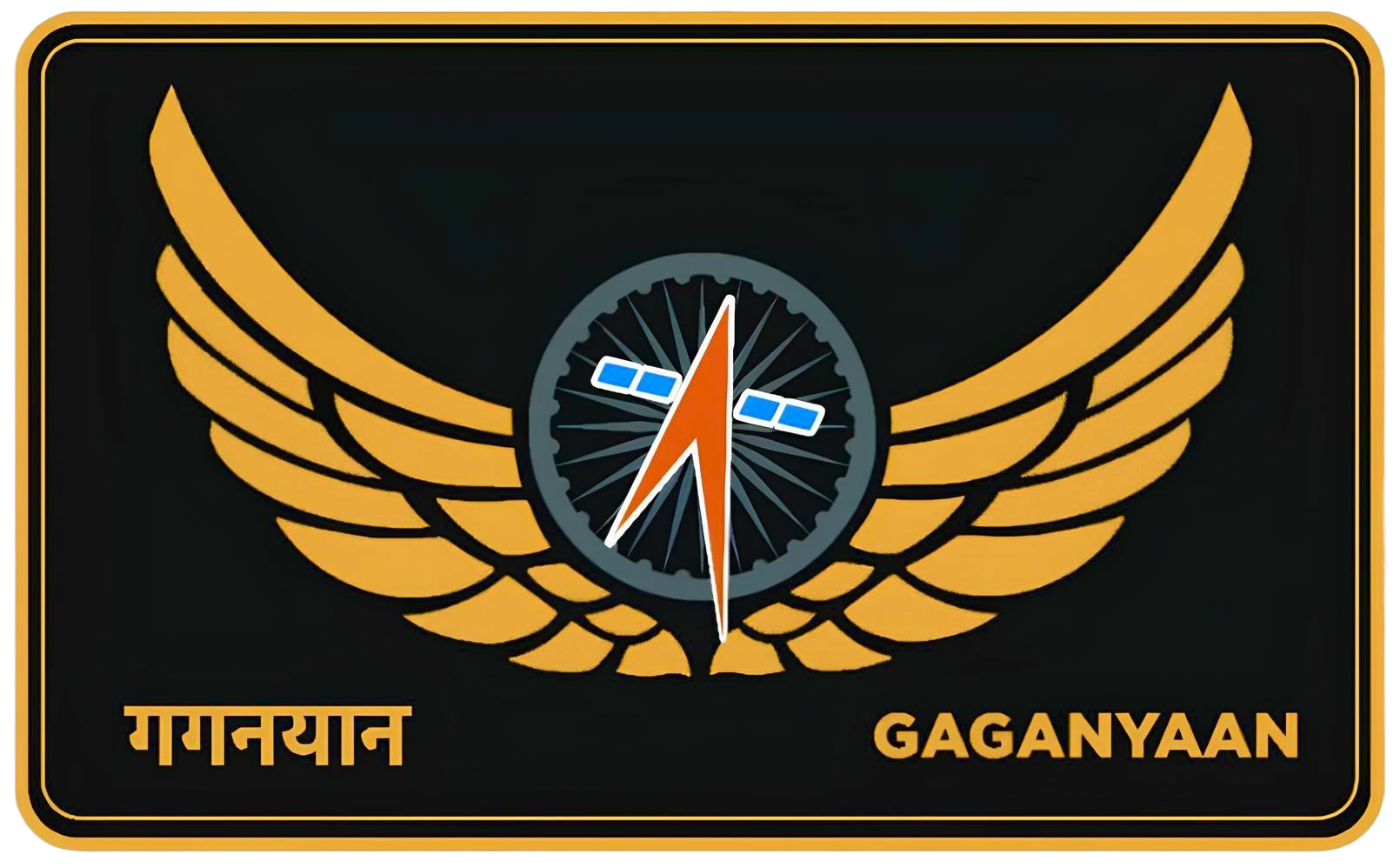
- Emblem of the Gaganyaan Project
- Active: 1982; 44 years ago
- Country: India
- Allegiance: India
- Branch: ISRO
- Type: Astronaut Corps
- Part of: ISRO
- Garrison/HQ: Human Space Flight Centre, Bengaluru, Karnataka, India

The Indian Astronaut Corps is a group of scientists affiliated to the Indian Space Research Organisation and pilot officers selected for participation in the Indian Human Spaceflight Programme.

== Background ==
India had historically close relations with the Soviet Space Programme. On 20 September 1982, following a rigorous selection and training process, the Indian Air Force selected two pilots, Rakesh Sharma and Ravish Malhotra for space travel as part of a joint programme between the IAF and the Soviet Interkosmos space agency. On 3 April 1984, Rakesh Sharma became the first Indian citizen to travel to space on board Soyuz T-11 as part of the Interkosmos programme, visiting Salyut 7 Space Station for a week.

Patch worn by Rakesh Sharma during Soyuz T-11 flight

Soyuz T-11 crew insignia

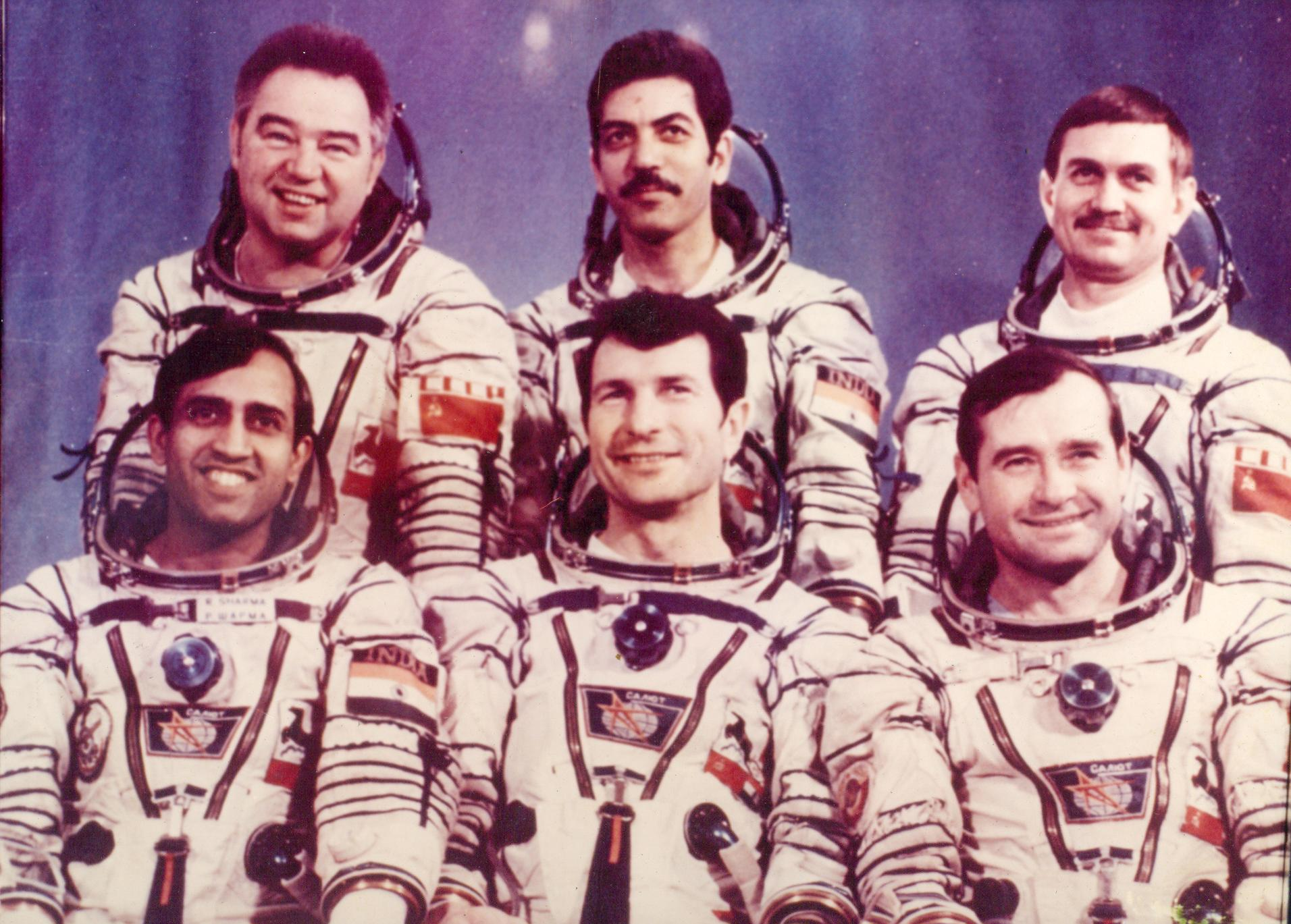
Soyuz T-11 prime and backup crew prior to launch

Following a commercial contract, ISRO selected P.Radhakrisnan Nair and Nagapathi C Bhat for a flight aborad STS-61I on the Space Shuttle Challenger in September 1986. The two crewmembers underwent training by NASA as payload specialists, but their flight was cancelled due to the Challenger disaster. Indian-born astronaut Kalpana Chawala would later fly into Space aboard STS-87 in 1997 after emigration for higher studies and selection to the NASA Astronaut group 15. She would perish during her next flight in the Columbia Disaster in 2003.

In 2018, the Government of India formally announced the launch of the Gaganyaan programme, which aimed to put a man in space by 2022. Before the Gaganyaan programme announcement in August 2018, human spaceflight was not a priority for ISRO, though related technologies have been developed since 2007, and it performed a Crew Module Atmospheric Re-entry Experiment and a Pad Abort Test for the programme.

In December 2018, the Indian government approved a further ₹100 billion (US$1.5 billion) for a 7-day crewed flight of 2–3 astronauts. Three uncrewed flights, named Gaganyaan-1, Gaganyaan-2 and Gaganyaan-3 are scheduled to launch in the 2020s, followed by a crewed flight on an HLVM3 rocket. To date, mission has been postponed several times until all certification requirements are completed. However, the plans were delayed partly due to the impact of COVID-19. As per the revised timelines, the first crewed flight is planned as a part of Gaganyaan-4, scheduled to launch in 2027.

== Selection of first batch ==
In the spring of 2009, a full-scale mock-up of the crew capsule was built and delivered to Satish Dhawan Space Centre for astronaut training. 200 Indian Air Force (IAF) pilots were shortlisted for training. The selection process would begin with the candidates completing an ISRO questionnaire, after which they would be subjected to physical and psychological analyses. Only 4 of the 200 applicants were to be selected for the first space mission training, two flying and two reservists.

ISRO signed a memorandum of understanding in 2009 with the IAF's Institute of Aerospace Medicine to conduct preliminary research on the psychological and physiological needs of the crew and the development of training facilities. The institute played a key role in determining astronaut training, the design of the crew capsule as per the anthropometric dimensions of the Indian population and a number of control and environmental systems as per psychological and physiological needs.

In January 2019, ISRO Chairman K. Sivan announced the creation of India's Human Space Flight Centre (HSFC) in Bengaluru for training astronauts. The ₹1,000 crore (US$103.8 million) centre will train the selected astronauts in rescue and recovery operations, operations in a zero-gravity environment, and monitoring of the radiation environment. While the HSFC will initially operate out of ISRO headquarters, a dedicated campus is planned to be built near Bengaluru. The facility will include offices, housing, testing and integration facilities and will also employ a workforce of 1,000 people in the long term.

ISRO has also proposed a ₹2,700 crore (US$280 million) plan to establish an astronaut training centre at Challakere in Chitradurga district. The facility would take at least 2–3 years to be established after the government's approval. An astronaut training facility will be established on a proposed 140-acre (0.57 km^{2}) site near Kempegowda International Airport in Devanahalli, Karnataka.

=== International Support ===
The HSFC and Glavkosmos, a subsidiary of Russian state corporation Roscosmos, signed an agreement on 1 July 2019 for cooperation in selection, support, medical examination, and space training of four Indian astronauts. An ISRO Technical Liaison Unit (ITLU) was approved to be set up in Moscow for coordinating activities. CNES is also supplying the flight system and training flight physicians and technical teams for the Indian Human Spaceflight Program. It is also collaborating and sharing its expertise in the domains of space medicine, astronaut health monitoring and life support.

== Training ==
As of September 2019, level 1 of the astronaut selection process was completed in Bengaluru. The selected test pilots underwent physical exercise tests, lab investigations, radiological tests, clinical tests, and evaluations on various facets of their psychology. By November 2019 the Indian Air Force had selected 12 potential astronauts who would then go to Russia for further training in two batches.

As selection criteria require test pilot experience, any females will not be part of the first Indian crewed spaceflight. The first crewed flight will consist of a crew of three with one backup and this team of four went to Russia for astronaut training.

Gaganyaan crew training video

In December 2019, the selection process came to a close, and four candidates began their 12-month training at the Yuri Gagarin Cosmonaut Training Center on 10 February 2020. The astronauts were trained for abnormal landings in various terrains, including forests, rivers, and sea. In February 2020, The Indian astronaut candidates completed their winter survival training. Following their training in Russia for unexpected and extreme situations, Indian astronauts were to return to India in March 2021 for the rest of their training in an Indian module. However, due to the COVID-19 pandemic, training was put on hold from 28 March, restarting on 12 May 2020. ISRO Astronauts then trained on an Static Mock-up Simulator of the Gaganyaan crew capsule for up to 18 hours a day.Critical parameters such as crew reachability, onboard audio-visual communication, emergency exit procedures, and responses to off-nominal mission scenarios were evaluated during this stage. ISRO also used VR technology for additional training purposes.

On the 91st Indian Air Force Day in 2023, the IAF released a video on Twitter, sharing a glimpse of the astronauts (without revealing their faces) training for the Gaganyaan mission. While two or three out of the four astronauts will be selected to fly on the first crewed flight, one of the astronauts on the mission previously flew on a mission to the ISS aboard Axiom-4 on 25 June 2025, as the second Indian astronaut in space after Rakesh Sharma. The four have been conducting mission-specific training in India since returning from Russia.

The crew training was briefly halted in 2025 due to academic obligations, Axiom Mission 4, and the 2025 India-Pakistan conflict, whereupon the four astronauts were deployed for active service with the IAF. From 2026, twelve months prior to launch, the astronauts will resume their mission-specific training, which will concentrate on advanced simulations, operational preparedness, and survival skills at Astronaut Training Facility in Bengaluru.

=== Mission MITRA ===
From April 2 to April 9, 2026, ISRO and the Institute of Aerospace Medicine launched Mission MITRA (Mapping of Interoperable Traits and Response Assessment) to examine crew dynamics, performance, and behavior in a space simulated environment. At an elevation of almost 4,000 meters, Mission MITRA was conducted in Likir, where Shubhanshu Shukla, Prasanth Nair, Ajit Krishnan, and Angad Pratap were placed in conditions such as hypoxia, low temperature and isolation. This is to comprehend the functioning of the Gaganyaan crew under pressure. The study focused on the crew's interpersonal skills, cognitive abilities, and physiological responses. The mission will produce knowledge on the effectiveness of decision-making under operational and environmental stress, as well as the interoperability between space crew and ground control teams. Researchers will keep an eye on integrated logistics, which evaluates communication protocols between the mission support teams and the field crew in Leh.

The goal of the mission, which was carried out in collaboration with the Department of Space, the Human Space Flight Centre, and defense organizations, is to generate standardized and structured data on team performance and psychological stability. Protoplanet, a Bengaluru-based start-up that supports operational standards, is in charge of facility management and compliance. It is anticipated that the information acquired from the experiment would improve simulation training programs and aid in the development of rules pertaining to crew interaction and survival, as well as the selection of crews for certain missions and the assignment of suitable tasks. The ESA CAVES served as an inspiration for the mission.

Protoplanet created the HOPE (Human Outer Planet Exploration) analog expedition, in which two simulated astronauts resided in cramped, isolated spaces that mirrored the circumstances humans might encounter on extended space trips. Everything was tested, including human behavior under severe situations and life support systems. HOPE will also assist in improving emergency response plans by validating habitat designs.

== First Candidate announcement ==
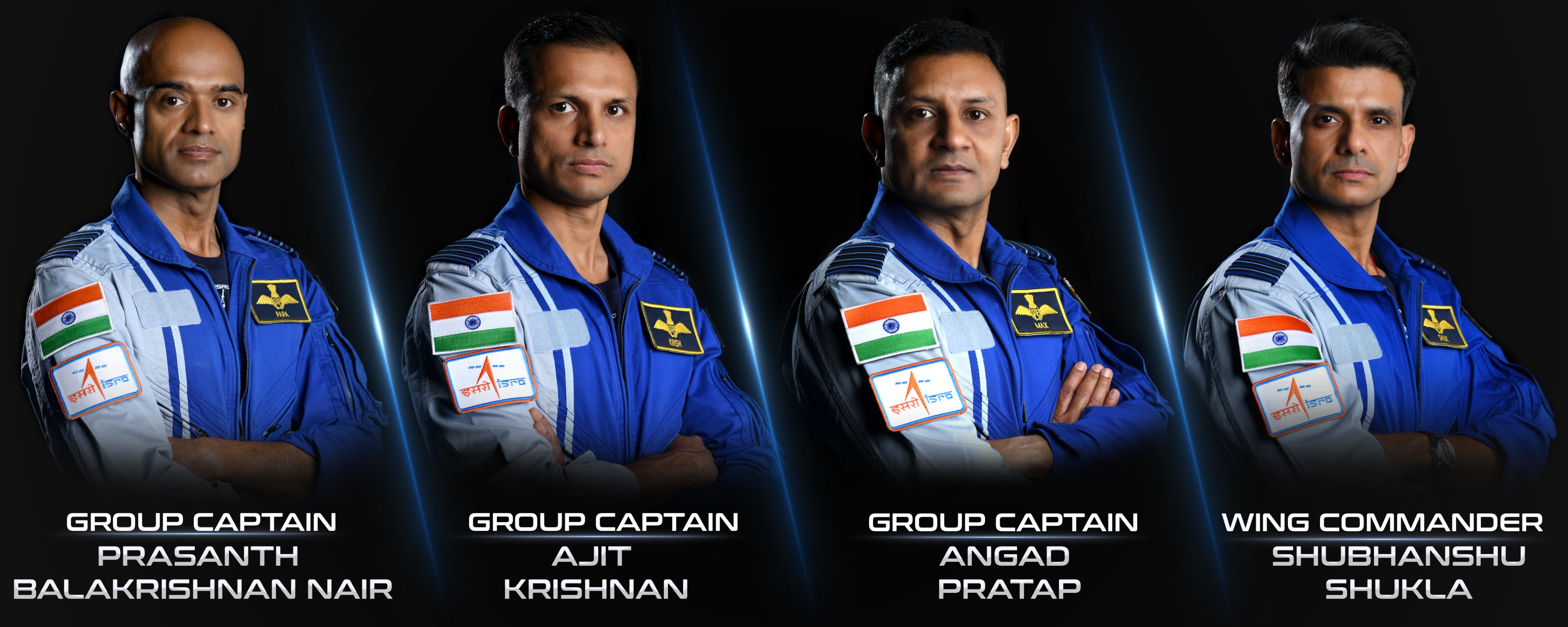

On 27 February 2024, at the Vikram Sarabhai Space Centre, Prime Minister Modi announced the names of the four designated astronauts who will be eligible for future flights as part of the Gaganyaan program, as well as the Indo-US joint mission (Axiom-4) to the ISS. Kerala Governor, Arif Mohammad Khan, Chief Minister, Pinarayi Vijayan, Minister of State for External Affairs V. Muraleedharan, ISRO chairman S. Somanath and other high-ranking ISRO officials were present at the reveal. The selected astronauts are Group Captain Prasanth Nair, Group Captain Ajit Krishnan, Group Captain Angad Pratap, and Group Captain Shubhanshu Shukla. They were given Indian astronaut wings and the Gaganyaan mission logo and motto. The Indo-US joint mission astronaut is Shubhanshu Shukla, while Nair was selected as his backup. Both were thus selected to train at NASA facilities.

Through Axiom Mission 4, Shubhanshu Shukla and Prasanth Nair obtained practical experience in microgravity adaptation, spaceflight operations, launch protocols, and emergency reaction training. Crucial operational experience was gained during the mission, including ingress and egress procedures, international coordination, medical diagnostics, pre-launch quarantine, and health preparation standards. This will assist ISRO in preparing ground crews and astronauts for the challenges of human spaceflight. As of October 2025, about 90% of the Gaganyaan's development work has been finished. A human-rated launch vehicle, life support systems, crew safety technologies, and human-centric equipment are among the important technological components that are close to completion.

== Uniform ==
=== Ground uniform ===
The ground uniforms were developed by staff and students of the National Institute of Fashion Technology (NIFT), Bengaluru. Under direction of the former NIFT director Susan Thomas, the team—students Lamia Anees, Samarpan Pradhan, and Tuliya D—and professors, Jonalee Bajpai and Mohan Kumar V—designed the ground uniform for the Gaganyaan mission. The team highlighted the importance that the astronaut-designates' pockets fit perfectly and the uniform support their motions. Seventy variants were considered before the final design was chosen. The NIFT team examined various space agency uniforms, such as those from SpaceX and NASA. The NIFT team explored asymmetry as a theme, developing a two-coloured, asymmetrical style line. The design was commissioned in 2021 by the NIFT team, and in 2022, they handed the design to ISRO.

=== Bio-vest ===
For the Gaganyaan programme, DRDO has created a wearable health monitoring system that includes subsystems such as an avionics interface unit, electronics, and a wearable textile belt. Two sets of electrocardiogram electrode leads, temperature sensors, and photoplethysmogram sensors are housed in a wearable textile belt. Four Bio-vests for crew training were delivered to ISRO in 2023.

=== Pressure suit ===
In collaboration with Space Applications Centre, Sure Safety, an industrial safety equipment firm based in Vadodara, finished developing pressure suit for Gaganyaan mission called Astronaut Crew Escape Suit (ACES). The experiments conducted in vacuum chambers to test the material under laboratory settings are almost finished as of 18 January 2019, according to Nishith Dand, managing director of Sure Safety. The indigenously developed suit weighs 20% less while maintaining high standards of safety against fire, water, pressure changes and one hundredth of the cost of its foreign counterpart. In terms of life support, oxygen/air management, and CBRN resistance, the ACES will combine the finest features of the Russian Sokol and the American Advanced Crew Escape Suit. The ACES's communications, pressure management, oxygen and carbon monoxide sensors, and biosensors for sensing body temperatures have all been developed successfully. The suit features air diverters, utility pockets, touch screen-sensitive gloves, a flexible hood zipper, and lightweight shoes. The temperature range in which ACES can function is −40 °C to +80 °C. ACES development project helped Sure Safety became one of the few companies globally with the expertise to create and build these types of suits.

In the event of an environmental emergency within the space capsule, ACES will protect the crew. Its goal is to preserve the wearer's life in the event that the spacecraft unintentionally loses pressurization.

=== Space suit ===
According to G. Madhavan Nair, space suit development has already begun in a low-key manner prior to the official Cabinet approval of ₹9,023 crore Gaganyaan project on 28 December 2018. During the Bengaluru Space Expo 2018, ISRO unveiled the prototype space suit for the Gaganyaan mission. The orange colour prototype space suit was created at Thiruvananthapuram's Vikram Sarabhai Space Centre. The lab began working on the prototype development from 2016. The prototype space suit weighs less than five kilograms and is constructed of four layers. One oxygen cylinder, sufficient for the astronaut to breathe for sixty minutes, can be accommodated in the suit. For the mission, ISRO has already created two suits and is currently working on the third one.

Chairman K. Sivan during an interview with India Today on 9 November 2018 stated that ISRO is continuing the research on spacesuits in order to enhance them. Glavkosmos has also contracted NPP Zvezda for manufacturing customized IVA flight-suits for Indian astronauts. Indian astronauts visited Zvezda on 3 September 2020, to have their anthropometric measurements taken in preparation for the creation of spacesuits later on. On 7 September 2020, Zvezda authorities announced that the organization had started manufacturing space suits for the Gaganyaan mission.

Hindustan Times reported on 12 January 2024, that in order to double-check crew safety for the first mission, Indian astronauts are expected to don Russian-made spacesuits rather than the domestically manufactured Intra Vehicular Activity (IVA) suits created by Vikram Sarabhai Space Center.

== Members ==
Name	Image	Missions	Flight duration	Selection Year
Rakesh Sharma		Soyuz-T-11		1982- Interkosmos
Ravish Malhotra		Soyuz-T-11	Backup Crew	1982- Interkosmos
P Radhakrisnan Nair		STS-61-I	Flight cancelled	1984 - NASA payload specialists
Nagapathi C Bhatt		STS-61-I	Flight cancelled	1984 - NASA payload specialists
Shubhanshu Shukla		Axiom-4		2024 Gaganyaan Crew
Prasanth B Nair		Axiom-4	Backup Crew	2024 Gaganyaan Crew
Ajit Krishnan				2024 Gaganyaan Crew
Angad Pratap		-	-	2024 Gaganyaan Crew

== Crew-oriented equipment development ==
=== Space food ===
The Mysore-based Defence Food Research Laboratory (DFRL), a unit of the Defence Research and Development Organisation (DRDO), developed dried and packaged food for astronauts. The 70 varieties of dehydrated and processed food items underwent strict procedures to eliminate microbacterial and macrobacterial nutrients. Special care has to be taken in the packaging, and the food items should be of limited weight and high nutritional quality. Waste disposal systems for leftover food, liquid dispensing systems, food rehydrating systems and heaters adaptable to outer space conditions are in development, although the list of food products planned to fly aboard Gaganyaan is yet to be publicised as of August 2020. DFRL is expected to launch its Ready-to-Eat (RTE) space food by March 2021. The initial batch for the crewed spaceflight Gaganyaan-H1 will carry foodstuffs sufficient for 7 days.

=== Space medicine ===
In May 2019, the Indian Air Force and ISRO signed an MoU that designated Institute of Aerospace Medicine as the primary organization responsible for providing medical support to the Gaganyaan programme. ISRO's Human Space Flight Centre and Glavcosmos, which is a subsidiary of the Russian state corporation Roscosmos, signed an agreement on 1 July 2019, for cooperation in the selection, support, medical examination and space training of Indian astronauts. An ISRO Technical Liaison Unit (ITLU) has been approved to be set up in Moscow for coordination.

Later in January 2021, India sent two flight surgeons to Russia and France for hands-on experience in space medicine. The flights surgeons are doctors from the Indian Air Force, specializing in aerospace medicine. In preparation for the human spaceflight programme, ISRO Chairman S. Somanath encouraged the National Institute of Mental Health and Neurosciences (NIMHANS) to come up with solutions for the astronauts' psychological health.

ISRO and CNES announced on April 15, 2021, a space agreement for cooperation in space equipment, consumables, and space medicine. The CNES team at the European Astronaut Centre in Cologne and the Centre for the Development of Microgravity Applications and Space Operations, or CADMOS, at the Toulouse Space Centre will provide training to flight physicians and Capsule Communicator (CAPCOM) mission control teams for Gaganyaan. Additionally, CNES will operate as a point of contact between ISRO and European Space Agency (ESA). CNES will assist in the execution of a scientific experiment plan for validation missions, knowledge sharing regarding food packaging and nutrition programs, and the use of French medical tools, equipment, and consumables by Indian astronauts. The Indian space crew will thus have access to French technology created by CNES that has been tested and is now in use aboard the International Space Station. CNES will also provide radiation- and shock-resistant carry bags to India to protect equipment. The future cooperation include parabolic flights conducted by Novespace for instrument testing and astronaut training, as well as technical assistance for the building of an astronaut training facility in Bangaluru.

An MoU has also been signed with All India Institute of Medical Sciences on 10 March 2026 for cooperation and joint research in Space Medicine and Research, particularly for long-duration missions to the BAS and potential crewed missions to the moon.

== Future ==
=== Selection of Second group of Astronauts ===
ISRO has acknowledged the need for additional astronauts on future space missions. A broader pool of potential astronauts will be created in collaboration with the IAF's Institute of Aerospace Medicine. Candidates from experimental domains and aeronautical research are of particular interest to ISRO. Angad Pratap, the Gaganyaan group captain, has stated that priority will be given to research work addressing difficulties ISRO faces in technical endeavours. Even if researchers and military aviators comprise the majority of initial crews, subsequent choices will probably be more diverse. The astronauts must become experts in space theory, take part in simulator training, and interact with scientists. Essential training at the Astronaut Training School (ATS) includes aero-medical training and survival training in a variety of settings, including sea, desert, and snow.

As per the records , Mr Jitendra Singh (flight test engineer & defence scientist) is undergoing training at Spaceflight Institute in France as India’s first Commercial Astronaut Candidate. He has successfully completed phase 1 & survival training in France & embarked on next phases of the astronaut training.

In April 2026, the Indian committee on astronaut selection and management recommended that the second batch of astronauts include a mix of military and civilian candidates. ISRO announced its willingness to open its astronaut corps to civilians, with the second group to have ten astronauts, six mission pilots drawn from military aviation backgrounds and four civilian specialists from science, technology, engineering, and mathematics fields. ISRO will also open select applicants from combat helicopter platforms for future Lunar missions. The selection process is to take place after the fourth Gaganyaan flight. They are expected to be trained for a period of four years. Future Gaganyaan missions will also have a larger crew capacity of three, for which a larger astronaut pool is to be developed. A third batch of 12 will be selected at a later date, with a stenght of 40 astronauts for BAS missions.

=== Humanoid robots ===
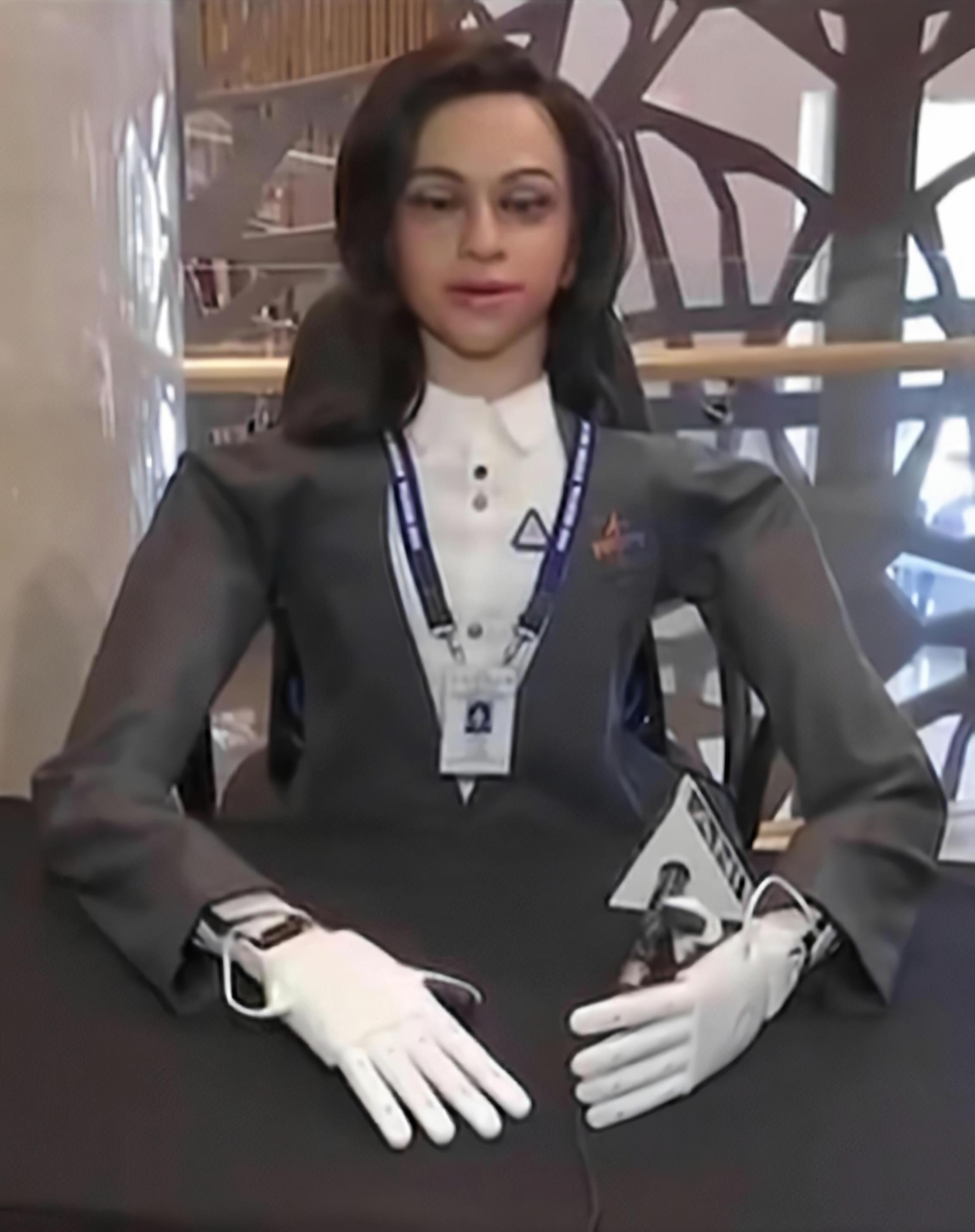
Vyommitra

Unlike other nations that have carried out human spaceflight, India will not fly animals into space. Instead, it will fly humanoid robots for a better understanding of what weightlessness and radiation do to the human body during a long duration in space.

On 22 January 2020, ISRO announced Vyommitra to accompany the other astronauts in the mission. ISRO aims not to fly animals onboard experimental missions unlike other nations that have carried out human space flight. Instead, it will fly humanoid robots for a better understanding of what weightlessness and radiation do to the human body during long durations in space.Vyommitra is expected to be onboard uncrewed Gaganyaan missions to perform microgravity experiments, monitor module parameters, and support astronauts in crewed missions by simulating functions like a human from the waist up. It can detect and give out warnings if environmental changes within the cabin get uncomfortable to astronauts and change the air condition. It can autonomously complete tasks and follow new commands. It is programmed to speak Hindi and English and perform multiple tasks.

== See also ==
Other Astronaut corps

- Canadian Astronaut Corps
- European Astronaut Corps
- NASA Astronaut Corps
- JAXA Astronaut Corps
- Roscosmos Cosmonaut Corps

Indian Space programme

- Indian Space Station
- Gaganyaan Crewed Spacecraft
- Indian Human Spaceflight Programme

Others

- List of Indian astronauts
- List of astronauts of Indian origin
