= Gaganyaan-4 =

Indian spaceflight, planned Q1 2027

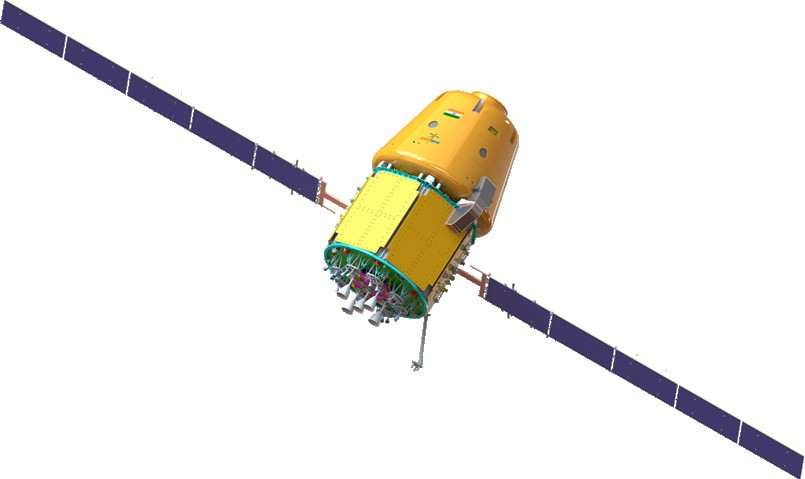
- Rendering of Gaganyaan crewed spacecraft
- Names: H1; Gaganyaan-4
- Mission type: Crewed flight test
- Operator: ISRO

Spacecraft properties
- Spacecraft: Gaganyaan
- Manufacturer: Hindustan Aeronautics Limited

Crew
- Members: Shubhanshu Shukla; TBA

Start of mission
- Launch date: Q1 2027 (planned)
- Rocket: HLVM3
- Launch site: Satish Dhawan Space Centre

Orbital parameters
- Reference system: Geocentric orbit
- Regime: Low Earth orbit
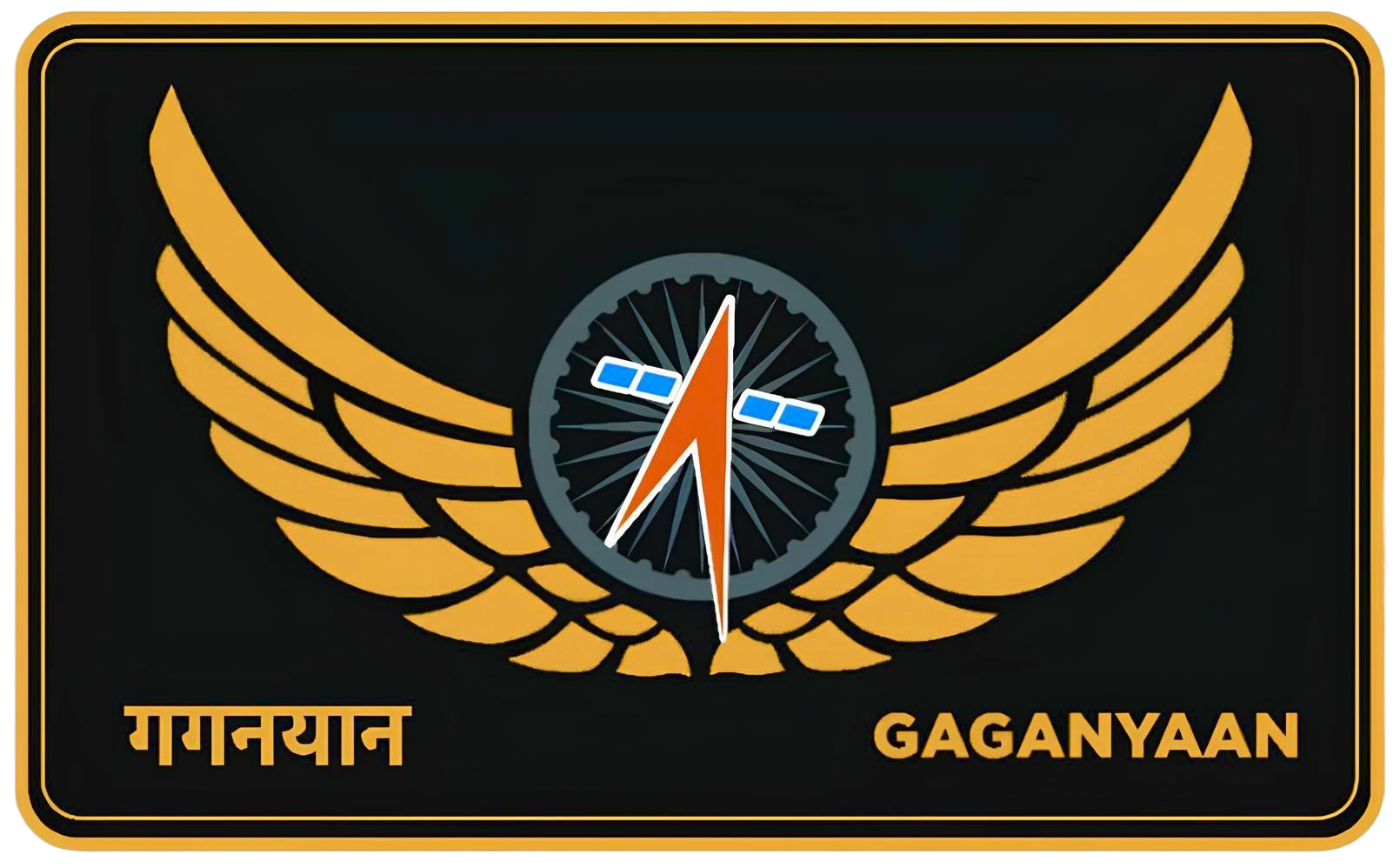
- Indian Human Spaceflight Programme

Gaganyaan-4 (from Sanskrit: gagana, "celestial" and yāna, "craft, vehicle") also named as H1 will be the first crewed test flight of the Gaganyaan programme, with launch planned for Q1 2027.

== Mission ==
The mission is planned to demonstrate human spaceflight capability by sending a crew to an orbit of 400 km of altitude for 7 days. Reporting in January 2020 for the Hindustan Times, Anonna Dutt quotes K. Sivan, then chairman of ISRO, as saying

We are designing the mission for three people to go to low earth orbit for seven days. However, whether we send two people or one person and whether they spend seven days in the orbit or one will be decided [after the] unmanned flights.

In October 2023, it was announced that the first crewed flight would take place after three uncrewed missions of the human-rated HLVM3. The launch is planned for Q1 2027 with the capsule coming down in the Indian Ocean.

== Background ==
The Indian Human Spaceflight Programme (or the Gaganyaan programme) is an ongoing project by ISRO to develop the technology needed to launch crewed spacecraft into low Earth orbit.

Before the Gaganyaan programme announcement in August 2018, human spaceflight was not a priority for ISRO, though related technologies have been developed since 2007, and it performed a Crew Module Atmospheric Re-entry Experiment and a Pad Abort Test for the programme. In December 2018, the Indian government approved a further ₹100 billion (US$1.5 billion) for a 7-day crewed flight of 2–3 astronauts. Three uncrewed flights, named Gaganyaan-1, Gaganyaan-2 and Gaganyaan-3 are scheduled to launch in the 2020s, followed by a crewed flight on an HLVM3 rocket. To date, mission has been postponed several times until all certification requirements are completed.

If completed successfully, India will become the fourth nation to conduct independent human spaceflight after the Soviet Union (Russia), United States, and China. After conducting the first crewed spaceflights, the agency intends to start a space station programme, crewed lunar landings, and crewed interplanetary missions in the long term.

== Crew ==
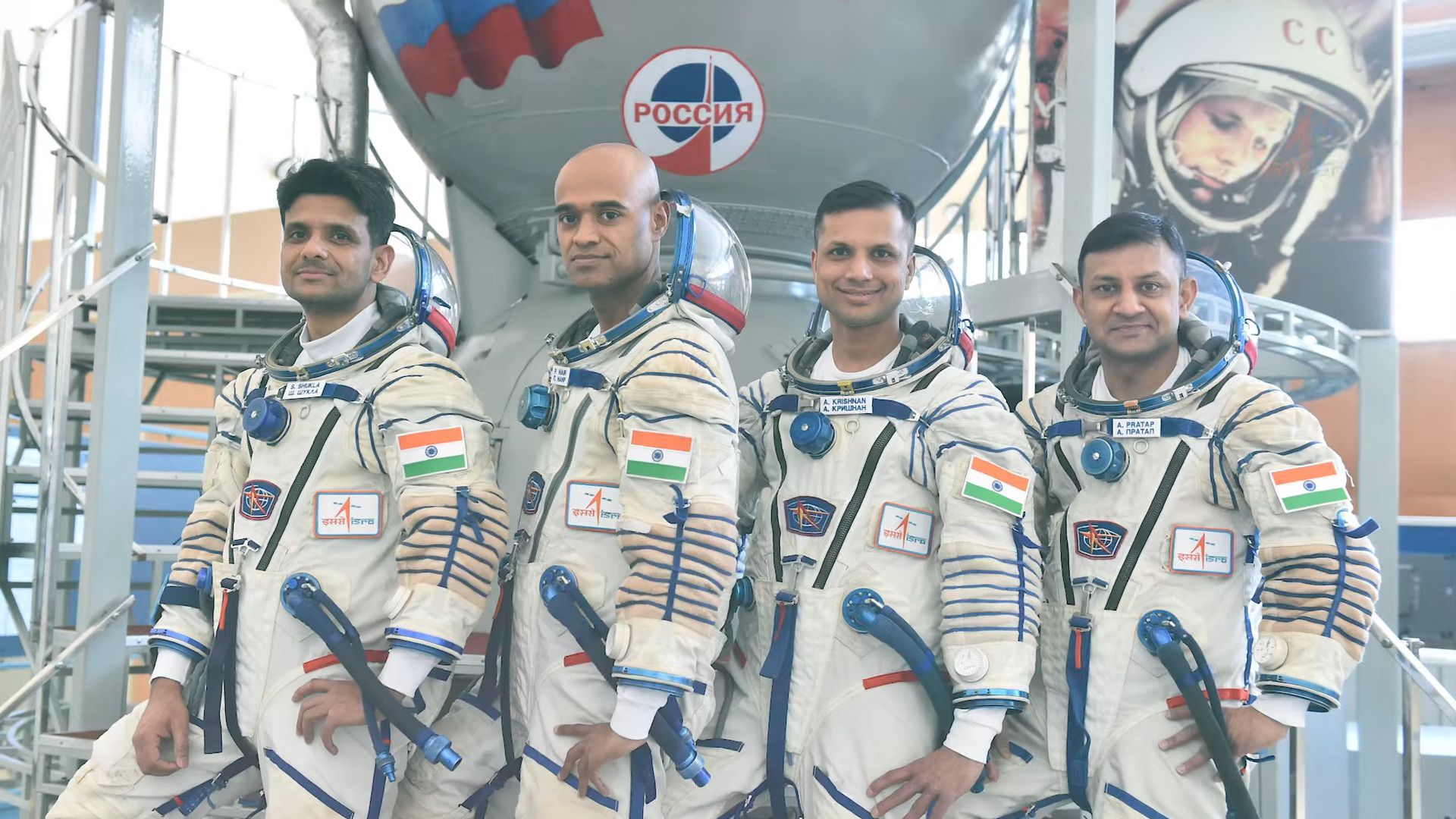
India's initial astronaut corps at the Yuri Gagarin Cosmonaut Training Center, from left: Shukla, Nair, Krishnan and Prathap

The Gaganyan programme astronauts, Prasanth Nair, Angad Pratap, Ajit Krishnan and Shubhanshu Shukla, were announced on 27 February 2024. Those selected for the first spaceflight will be from this pool of qualified astronauts, and one of them, Shubhanshu Shukla flew to the ISS in 2025 on Axiom Mission 4 with Prasanth Nair as his backup. It is considered that one or two crewmembers will take part of this mission, with one being Shukla due to his flight experience.

Prime crew
Position	Astronaut
Commander	(India) Shubhanshu Shukla, ISRO; Second spaceflight
Pilot (Unconfirmed)	(India) TBA, ISRO; First spaceflight

== Spacecraft ==
Gaganyaan (Sanskrit: [ɡəɡənəjɑːnə],, from Sanskrit: gagana, "celestial" and yāna, "craft, vehicle") is an Indian crewed orbital spacecraft intended to be the formative spacecraft of the Indian Human Spaceflight Programme. The spacecraft is being designed to carry three people to low Earth orbit, and a planned upgraded version will be equipped with rendezvous and docking capabilities.

== Launch vehicle ==
Representation of Human Rated LVM3

The Launch Vehicle Mark-3 or LVM3 (previously referred as the GSLV Mk III) (Note: ISRO changed the name of GSLV Mk III to LVM3 after the successful launch of LVM3-M2 mission. The rename was done to remove any ambiguity on the ability of the vehicle to put payloads in a particular orbit.) is a three-stage medium-lift launch vehicle developed by ISRO. Primarily designed to launch communication satellites into geostationary orbit, it is also due to launch crewed missions under the Indian Human Spaceflight Programme. LVM3 has a higher payload capacity than its predecessor, GSLV.

== Future international collaboration ==
ISRO, the Department of Space and the Indian National Space Promotion and Authorization Center (IN-SPACe), together with Voyager Space, agreed to a memorandum of understanding to explore the use of Gaganyaan for crew transportation to Voyager's planned Starlab space station.
