= List of Indian astronauts =

On 3 April 1984, Rakesh Sharma became the first Indian to travel to space. He traveled on board Soyuz T-11 to the space station Salyut 7 as part of the Soviet Interkosmos programme. In the late 2000s, Indian Space Research Organisation (ISRO) announced that it is working on the technologies required for sending humans to space as a part of the Indian Human Spaceflight Programme.

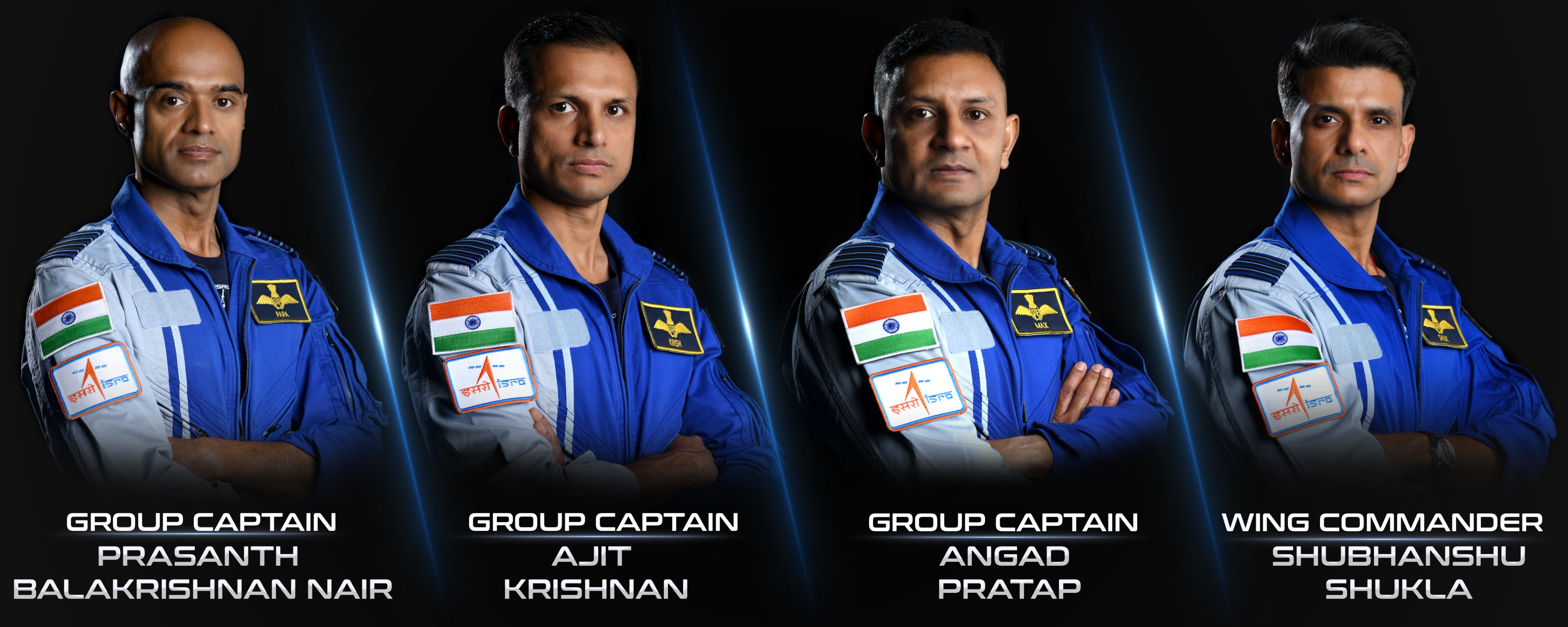
Members of the planned Gaganyaan program of the Indian Space Research Organisation

In 2018, the Government of India formally announced the launch of the Gaganyaan programme, which aimed to put a man in space by 2022. However, the plans were delayed partly due to the impact of COVID-19. As per the revised timelines, the first crewed flight is planned as a part of Gaganyaan-4, scheduled to launch in 2027.) On 27 February 2024, four men (Gaganyatri) – Ajit Krishnan, Angad Pratap, Prasanth Nair, and Shubhanshu Shukla, from the Indian Air Force were announced as candidates for the human spaceflight programme. They trained at Russia's Yuri Gagarin Cosmonaut Training Center, where Sharma had trained in 1984. Nair and Shukla trained at NASA facilities in preparation for their participation in the Axiom Mission 4 to the International Space Station. Shukla flew to space on 25 June 2025 as a part of the mission, while Nair was his backup.

On 19 May 2024, Gopichand Thotakura became the first Indian to take a suborbital flight to space, as a part of the Blue Origin NS-25 mission.

== List ==
Apart from the Indians who had traveled to space, the list also includes those who have trained for space travel but have not traveled to space. (Note: Technically, the term 'astronaut' refers to only persons trained, equipped, and deployed by a human spaceflight program as a crew member of a spacecraft.)

Interkosmos Program
| Name | Image | Birth | Time in Space | Missions | Notes |
|---|---|---|---|---|---|
| Rakesh Sharma | | 13 January 1949 | 7 days, 21 hours, 40 minutes | (Soviet Union) Soyuz T-11 (3 April 1984) | First Indian in space. |
| Ravish Malhotra | | 25 December 1943 | —N/a | —N/a | Backup for Sharma in Soyuz T-11. |
Suborbital Flight
| Gopichand Thotakura | | 1993 | 9 minutes, 53 seconds | (United States) Blue Origin NS-25 (19 May 2024) | Second Indian in space.; First Indian to take a suborbital flight to space. |
Indian Human Spaceflight Programme
| Name | Image | Birth | Time in Space | Missions | Notes |
| Shubhanshu Shukla | | 10 October 1985 | 20 days, 2 hours and 59 minutes | (United States) Axiom Mission 4 (25 June 2025) | Second Indian in Orbit.; Longest-stay by an Indian in space.; First Indian in ISS. |
| Prasanth Nair | | 26 August 1976 | —N/a | —N/a | Backup for Shukla on Axiom Mission 4. |
| Ajit Krishnan | | 19 April 1982 | —N/a | —N/a | Part of Gaganyaan. |
| Angad Pratap | | 17 July 1982 | —N/a | —N/a | Part of Gaganyaan. |

== See also ==
- History of spaceflight
- Human spaceflight
- List of Asian astronauts
- List of astronauts by selection
