= Angad Pratap =

Indian test pilot and astronaut-designate (born 1982)

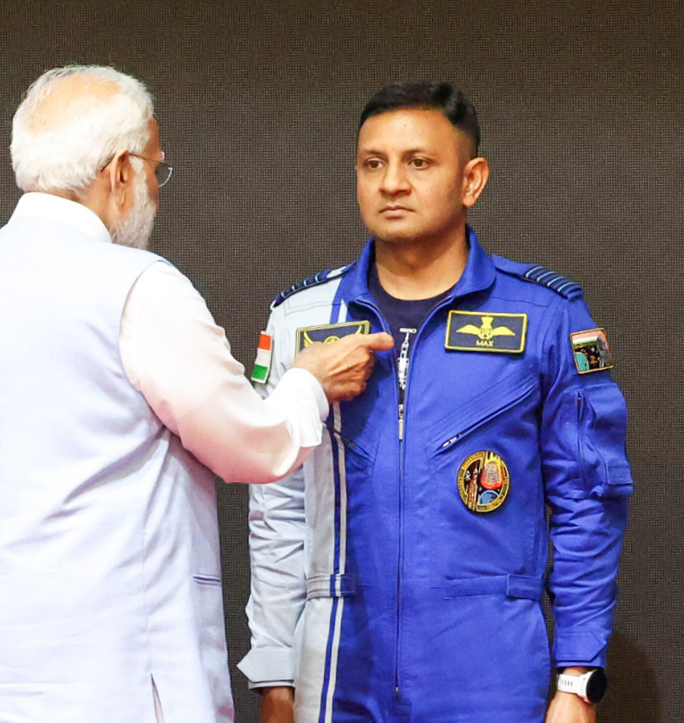
- Pratap, being felicitated by Indian prime minister Narendra Modi in 2024
- Born: 17 July 1982 (age 44); Prayagraj, Uttar Pradesh, India
- Education: Jawaharlal Nehru University (B.S.); National Defence Academy; Indian Air Force Academy; Indian Institute of Science (M.Tech.)
- Occupations: Astronaut; Test pilot
- Space career

ISRO astronaut
- Selection: 1st Gaganyatri Group (2019)
- Military career
- Allegiance: India
- Branch: Indian Air Force
- Service years: 2004–present
- Rank: Group captain

Angad Pratap (born 17 July 1982) is a group captain and test pilot with the Indian Air Force and gaganyatri (astronaut) with the Indian Space Research Organisation (ISRO). In 2019, he was one of the four men identified to be trained for the Gaganyaan mission of the ISRO, part of the Indian human spaceflight programme.

== Early life and education ==
Pratap was born in Prayagraj, Uttar Pradesh. He completed his schooling at Springdales School. He later graduated from the National Defence Academy, and joined the Air Force Academy.

== Defence career ==
Pratap was commissioned into the fighter stream of the Indian Air Force on 18 December 2004. As of 2025, Pratap holds the rank of group captain in the Indian Air Force. He has over 2,900 flying hours of experience, in aircraft such as Antonov An-32, Dornier Do 228, Mikoyan-Gurevich MiG-21, Mikoyan MiG-29, and Sukhoi Su-30 MKI. He initially served as a flying instructor before qualifying as a test pilot. He served as a flying instructor and test pilot prior to his selection for the human spaceflight programme.

== Astronaut career ==
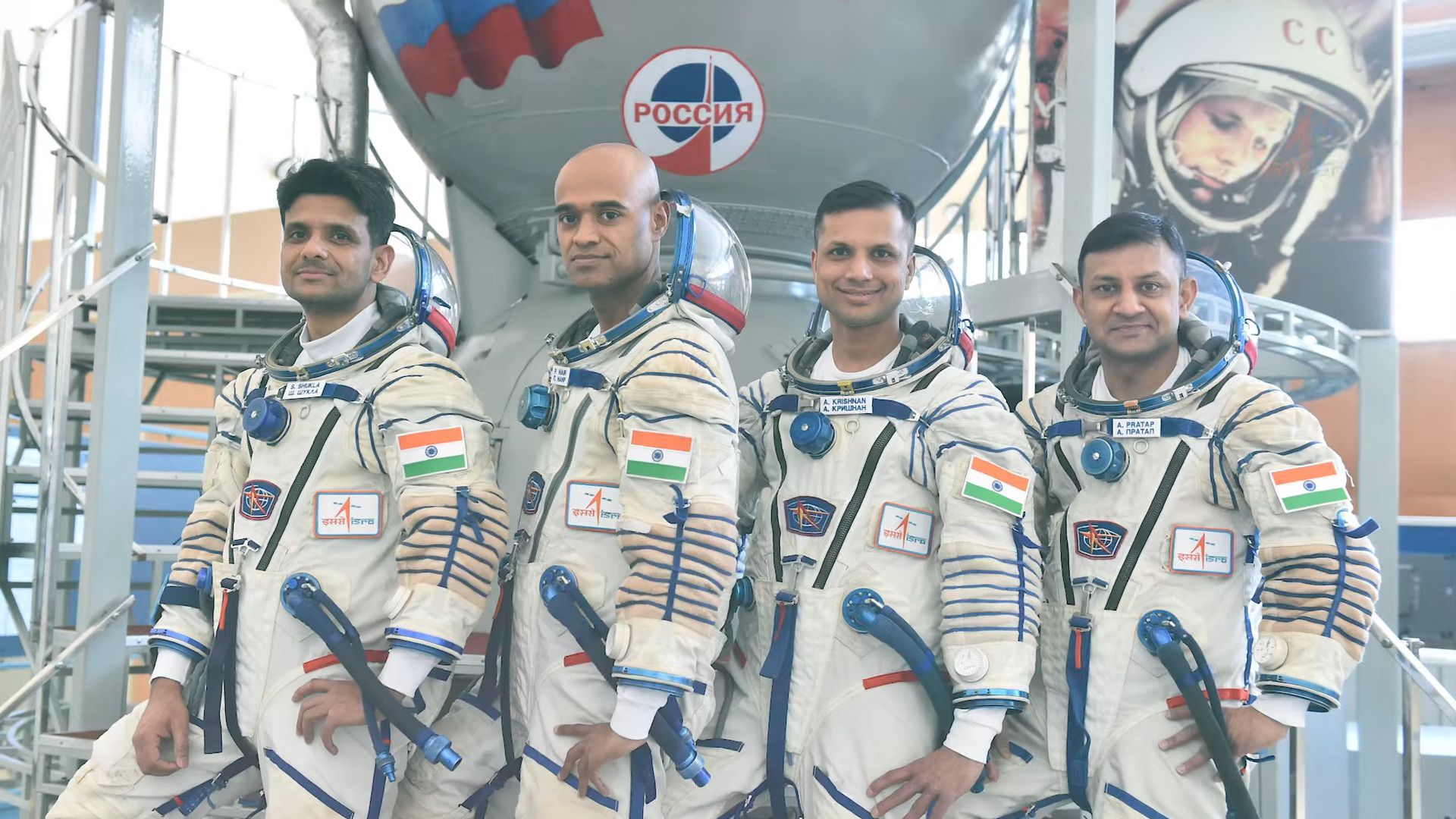
Pratap (right) at the Yuri Gagarin Cosmonaut Training Center

In 2019, Pratap was shortlisted by the Institute of Aerospace Medicine for the Gaganyaan programme of the ISRO. He was among four candidates selected for training as a part of the Indian Human Spaceflight Programme. He trained at the Yuri Gagarin Cosmonaut Training Center in Russia from 2020 to 2021. He later underwent mission-specific training at ISRO's Astronaut Training Facility in Bengaluru.

On 27 February 2024, ISRO officially introduced Pratap as a member of the astronaut team for Gaganyaan, India's planned first human spaceflight mission. As of 2025, he continued to train as part of the Gaganyaan crew, with the first crewed mission expected in 2027.
