= Prasanth Nair =

Indian flight instructor (born 1976)

Prasanth Nair KC
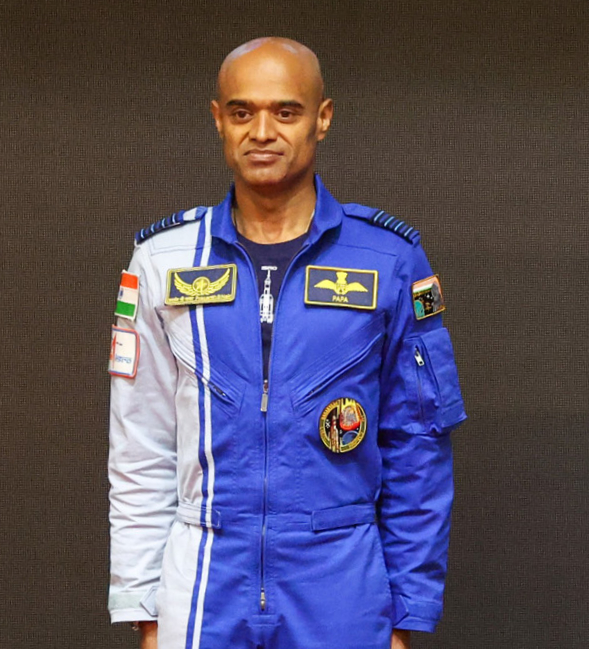
- Nair in 2024
- Born: 26 August 1976 (age 50); Palakkad, Kerala, India
- Education: Jawaharlal Nehru University (B.S.); National Defence Academy; Indian Air Force Academy; Indian Institute of Science (M.S.); Defence Services Staff College; Flying Instructors School
- Occupations: Astronaut; Flight instructor; Test pilot
- Space career

ISRO astronaut
- Selection: 1st Gaganyatri Group (2019)
- Military career
- Allegiance: India
- Branch: Indian Air Force
- Service years: 1998–present
- Rank: Air Commodore
- Service number: 25284
- Awards: Kirti Chakra
- Spouse: Lenaa (m. 2024)

Prasanth Balakrishnan Nair KC is an Air commodore and flight instructor with the Indian Air Force and Gaganyatri (astronaut) with the Indian Space Research Organisation (ISRO). In 2019, he was one of the four men identified to be trained for the Gaganyaan mission of the ISRO, part of the Indian human spaceflight programme. He was the back up to Shubhanshu Shukla for the Axiom Mission 4, a privately organised spaceflight to the International Space Station.

== Early and personal life ==
Prasanth Balakrishnan Nair was born in Nemmara, Palakkad, Kerala on 26 August 1976 to Vilambil Balakrishnan Nair. He spent a portion of his childhood in Kuwait before his family returned to India after the Iraqi invasion of Kuwait in 1990. He completed his schooling at Chinmaya Vidyalaya in Pallavur. After completing school, he attended the NSS College of Engineering for seven months before he appeared for and cleared the National Defence Academy and Naval Academy Examination.

Nair married Indian actress Lenaa in January 2024. He was promoted from Group Captain to Air Commodore in the Indian Air Force on 7 April 2026.

== Career ==
Nair graduated from the Air Force Academy in 1998 and received the 'Sword of Honour' for the best ranking cadet. He was commissioned as a flying officer in the Indian Air Force (IAF) on 19 December 1998. He has over 3,000 flying hours of experience, in aircraft such as Antonov An-32, Dornier Do 228, Mikoyan-Gurevich MiG-21, Mikoyan MiG-29, and Sukhoi Su-30 MKI. He attended the Defence Services Staff College and the Flying Instructors School to become a certified flight instructor in the IAF.

== Astronaut career ==
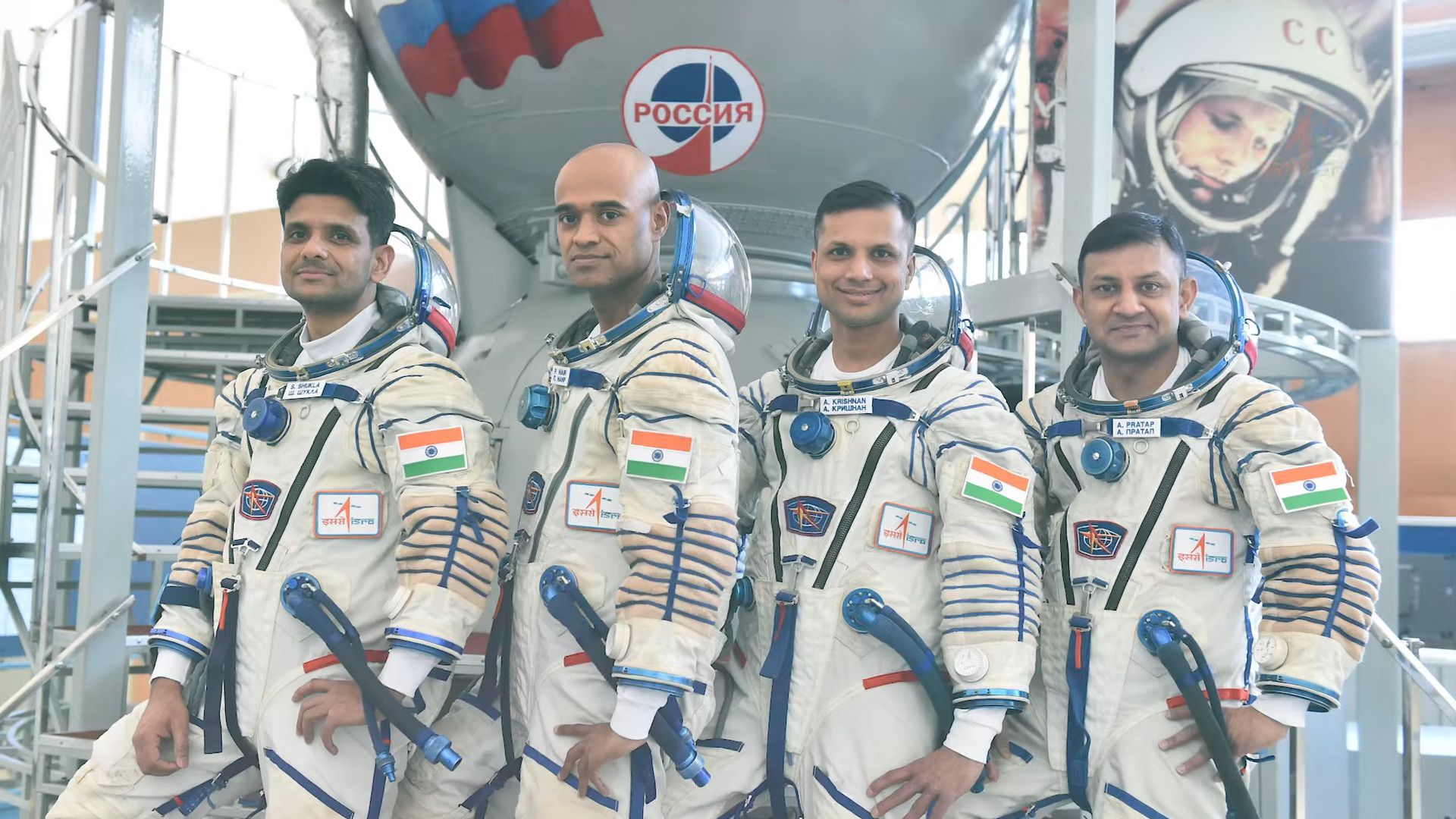
Nair (second from left) at the Yuri Gagarin Cosmonaut Training Center

In 2019, Nair was shortlisted by the Institute of Aerospace Medicine for the Gaganyaan programme of the Indian Space Research Organisation (ISRO). He was among four candidates selected for training as a part of the Indian Human Spaceflight Programme. He trained at the Yuri Gagarin Cosmonaut Training Center in Russia from 2020 to 2021. He later underwent mission-specific training at ISRO's Astronaut Training Facility in Bengaluru and completed a Master of Engineering degree in aerospace engineering from the Indian Institute of Science. On 27 February 2024, ISRO officially introduced Nair as a member of the astronaut team for Gaganyaan-4, India's planned first human spaceflight mission. On 2 August 2024, ISRO announced that Nair would serve as a back up to Shubhanshu Shukla for the Axiom Mission 4 to the International Space Station (ISS). He and Shukla trained at the NASA's Johnson Space Center in Houston, for the mission.

== Awards ==
Nair was decorated with the Kirti Chakra, the second highest peacetime Indian military decoration, in the 2026 Republic Day honours and decorations list.

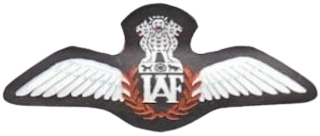

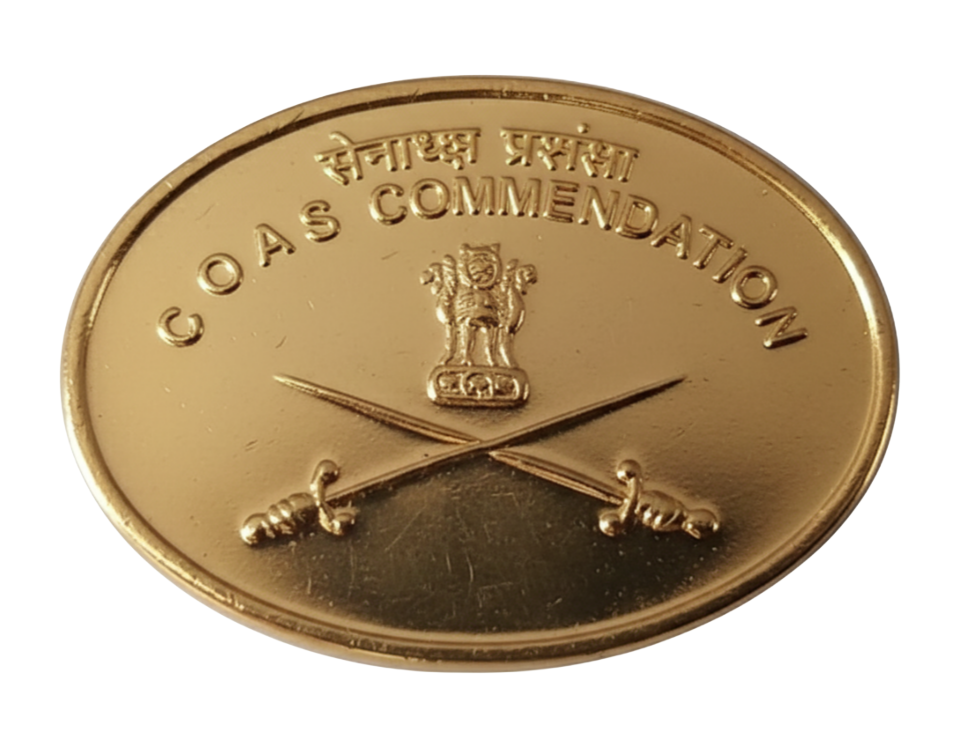

Pilot Badge
Kriti Chakra		Samanya Seva Medal	
Special Service Medal	Operation Vijay Medal	Operation Parakram Medal	Sainya Seva Medal
High Altitude Medal	75th Independence Anniversary Medal	20 Years Long Service Medal	9 Years Long Service Medal
Commedation Card
