= Shubhanshu Shukla =

Indian test pilot and astronaut (born 1986)

Shubhanshu Shukla AC
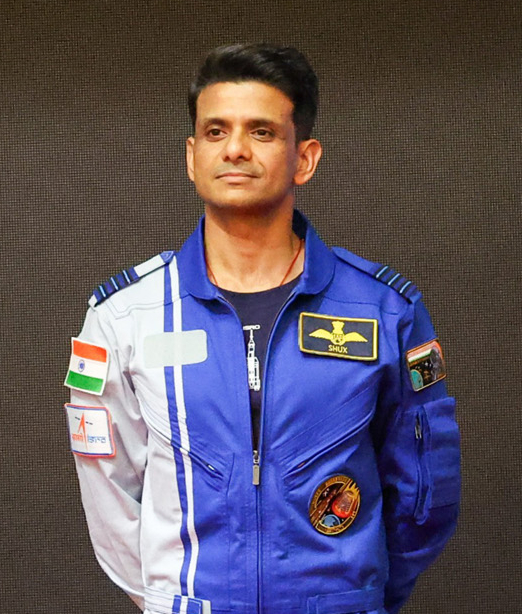
- Shukla in 2024
- Born: 10 October 1985 (age 40); Lucknow, Uttar Pradesh, India
- Education: Jawaharlal Nehru University (B.S.); National Defence Academy; Indian Air Force Academy; Indian Institute of Science (M.Tech.)
- Occupations: Astronaut; Test pilot
- Awards: Ashoka Chakra
- Space career

ISRO Astronaut
- Time in space: 20 days, 2 hours, and 59 minutes
- Selection: 1st Gaganyatri Group (2019)
- Missions: Axiom Mission 4
- Military career
- Allegiance: India
- Branch: Indian Air Force
- Service years: 2006–present
- Rank: Group captain
- Nicknames: Shux, Gunjan
- Service number: 29014

Shubhanshu Shukla AC is a group captain in the Indian Air Force (IAF) and gaganyatri (astronaut) with the Indian Space Research Organisation (ISRO). Commissioned into the IAF in June 2006, he piloted a range of fighter aircraft, and served as a test pilot later. In 2019, he was one of the four men identified to be trained for the Gaganyaan mission of the ISRO, the Indian human spaceflight programme. In July 2025, he became the first Indian to visit the International Space Station as a part of the Axiom Mission 4, a privately organised spaceflight. He is the second Indian to travel to outer space, after Rakesh Sharma in 1984. In 2026, he was awarded the Ashoka Chakra, the highest peacetime Indian military decoration.

== Early and personal life ==
Shubhanshu Shukla was born on 10 October 1985 in Lucknow. He is the youngest of the three children of government official Shambhu Dayal Shukla and Asha. He completed his schooling at City Montessori School in Lucknow. Motivated by the Kargil War in 1999, he appeared for and cleared the National Defence Academy and Naval Academy Examination. He obtained his Bachelor of Science degree in computer science from the Jawaharlal Nehru University.

Shukla is married to dentist Kamna Mishra, who was his classmate at school, and the couple have a son.

== Defence career ==
After passing out of the National Defence Academy in 2005, he subsequently enrolled at the Indian Air Force Academy. He was commissioned into the fighter stream of the Indian Air Force (IAF) as a flying officer in June 2006. He was promoted to wing commander in June 2019. He is a qualified test pilot with over 2,000 hours of flying experience on a wide variety of aircraft, including the BAE Hawk, Dornier 228, Mikoyan-Gurevich MiG-21, Mikoyan MiG-29, SEPECAT Jaguar, and Sukhoi Su-30MKI. He was promoted to the rank of group captain with the IAF in 2024.

== Astronaut career ==
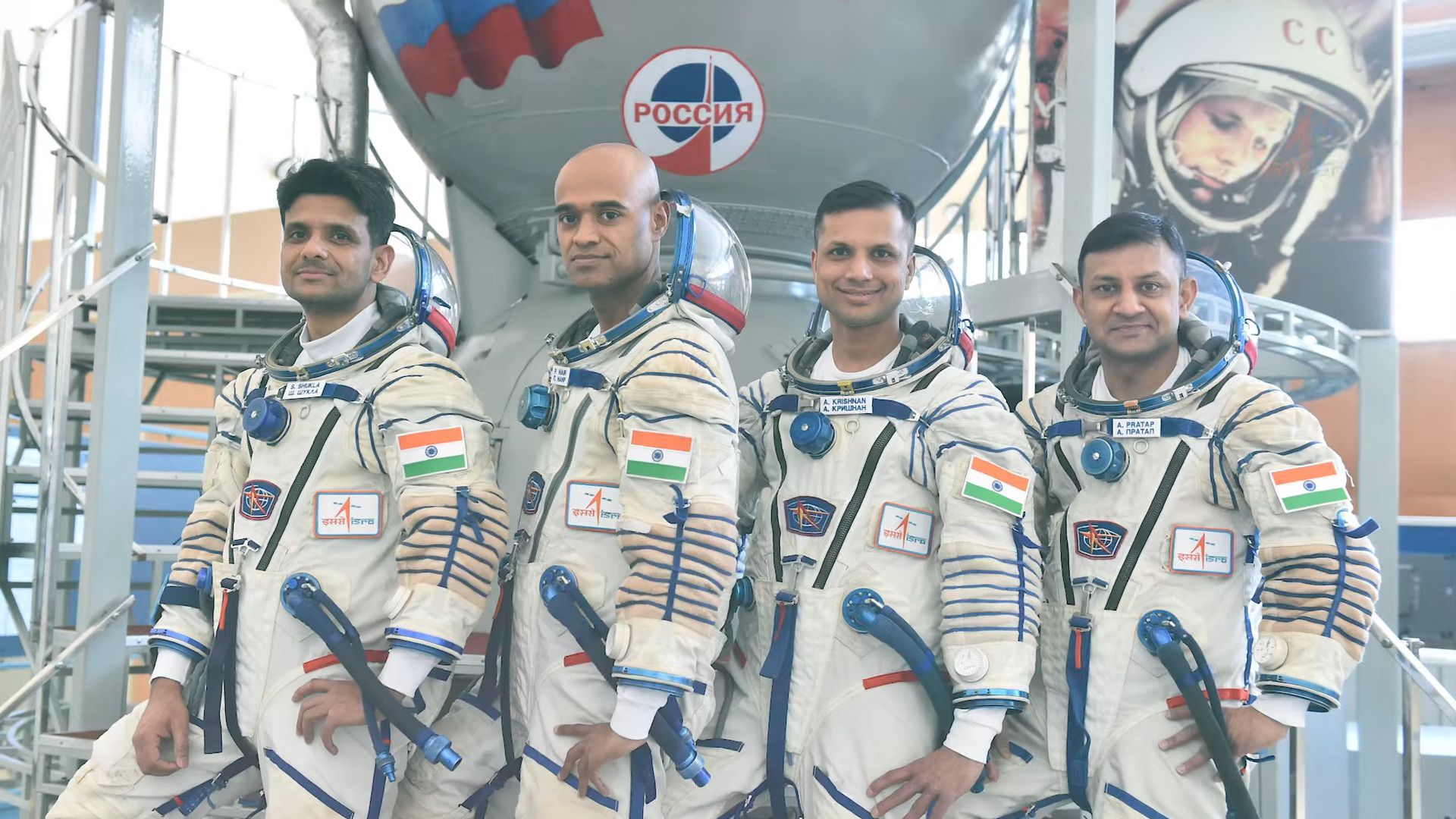
Shukla (left), with Indian astronauts, at the Yuri Gagarin Cosmonaut Training Center

In 2019, Shukla was shortlisted by the Institute of Aerospace Medicine for the Gaganyaan programme of the Indian Space Research Organisation (ISRO). He was among four candidates selected for training as a part of the Indian Human Spaceflight Programme.

Shukla trained at the Yuri Gagarin Cosmonaut Training Center in Russia from 2020 to 2021. He later underwent mission-specific training at ISRO's Astronaut Training Facility in Bengaluru and completed a Master of Engineering degree in aerospace engineering from the Indian Institute of Science. On 27 February 2024, ISRO officially introduced Shukla as a member of the astronaut team for Gaganyaan-4, India's planned first human spaceflight mission.

=== Axiom Mission 4 ===
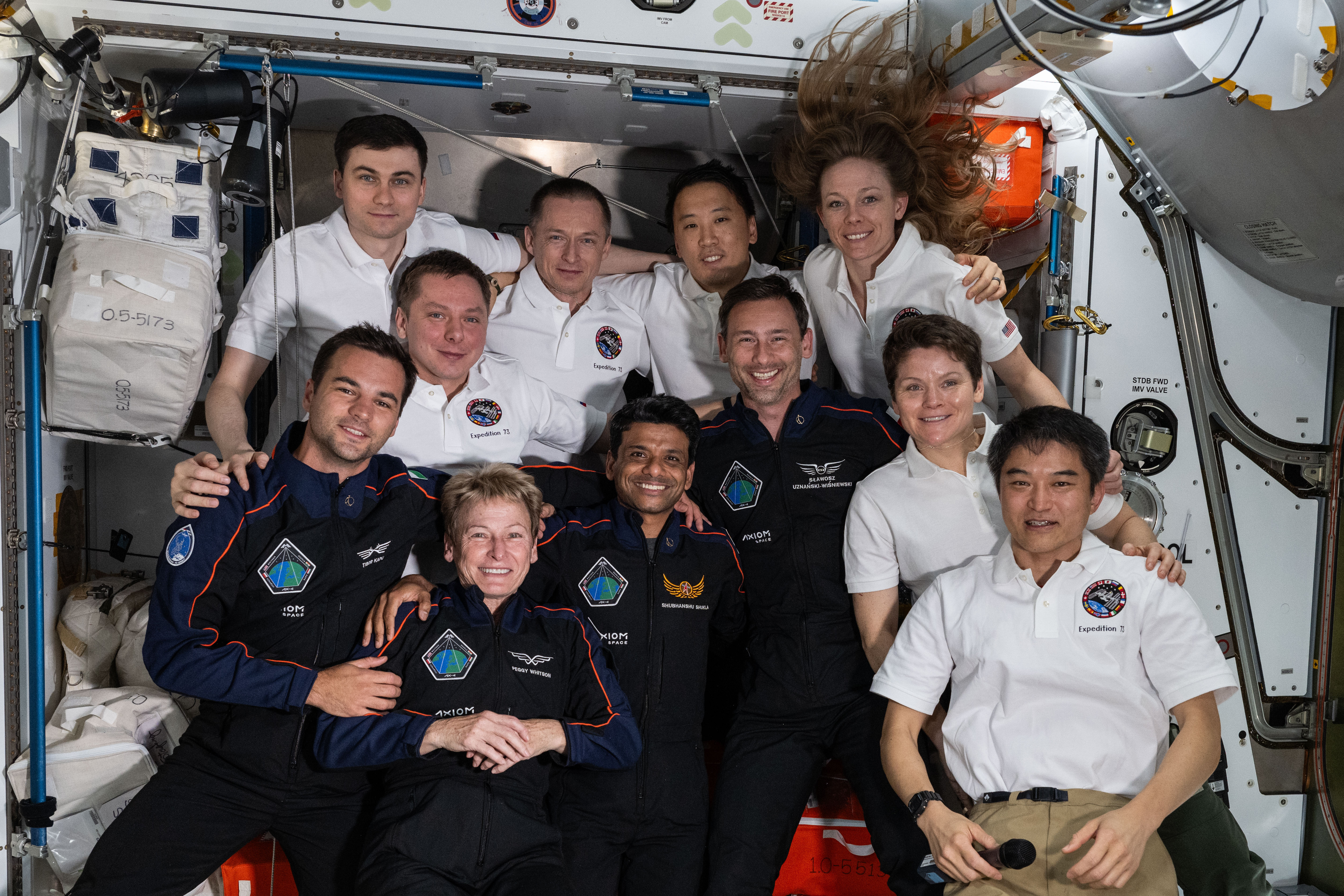
Shukla (front row, third from left) at the International Space Station

On 2 August 2024, ISRO announced that Shukla would be part of the Axiom Mission 4 to the International Space Station (ISS). He and fellow astronaut Prasanth Nair trained at the NASA's Johnson Space Center in Houston, for the mission. The mission was a collaboration between ISRO, NASA, and SpaceX. Shukla was designated as the mission pilot. The mission was led by veteran Peggy Whitson, alongside mission specialists Sławosz Uznański-Wiśniewski and Tibor Kapu.

The mission successfully lifted off from Launch Complex 39A at the NASA's Kennedy Space Center in Florida on 25 June 2025 at 06:31 UTC. It docked with the ISS on 26 June 2025 at 10:31 UTC, and Shukla became the first Indian astronaut to visit the ISS, and the second Indian to travel to outer space, after Rakesh Sharma in 1984. The crew entered the ISS at 12:14 UTC, and at 14:00 UTC, a formal welcome ceremony for the visiting crew took place, during which Whitson gave Shukla an astronaut pin, designating him as the 634th person to reach space.

"Namaskar, my dear countrymen! What a ride! We are back in the space once again after 41 years. It's an amazing ride. We are revolving around the Earth at a speed of 7.5 kilometres per second. The Tiranga embossed on my shoulders tells me that I am with all of you. This journey of mine is not a beginning to the International Space Station but to India's Human Space Programme. I want all of you to be part of this journey. Your chest, too, should swell with pride... Together, let's initiate India's Human Space Programme. Jai Hind! Jai Bharat!"

— Shukla's first message from outer space addressing the nation

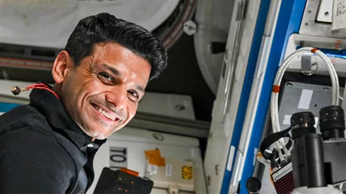
Shukla at the International Space Station

Indian president Droupadi Murmu, prime minister Narendra Modi and the IAF congratulated Shukla. While onboard the ISS, Shukla participated in public outreach, including a live videoconference with the prime minister on 28 June and ham radio conversations with school students on 4 July, and 8 July. On 6 July, he participated in a conversation with V. Narayanan, the chairman of ISRO and other officials on the experiments and activities with regards to the India's Indian Human Spaceflight Programme.

Shukla's mission was a commercially arranged effort where he spent two weeks on the ISS, conducting around 60 experiments, with at least seven designated by the ISRO. Estimates suggest that the Indian government spent approximately ₹5.48 billion (equivalent to ₹5.7 billion or US$59 million in 2026) for Shukla's seat on the mission. ISRO officials have defended the cost, citing the benefits of gaining valuable experience in space during the mission and exposure to critical processes and infrastructure.

== Awards and honors ==
Shukla was decorated with the Ashoka Chakra, the highest peacetime Indian military decoration, in the 2026 Republic Day honours and decorations list. In May 2026, he was named by the Karman Project as one of its 2026 fellows.

| Ashoka Chakra | Samanya Seva Medal | Special Service Medal | Sainya Seva Medal |
| High Altitude Medal | 75th Independence Anniversary Medal | 20 Years Long Service Medal | 9 Years Long Service Medal |
