= Ajit Krishnan =

Indian test pilot and astronaut-designate (born 1982)

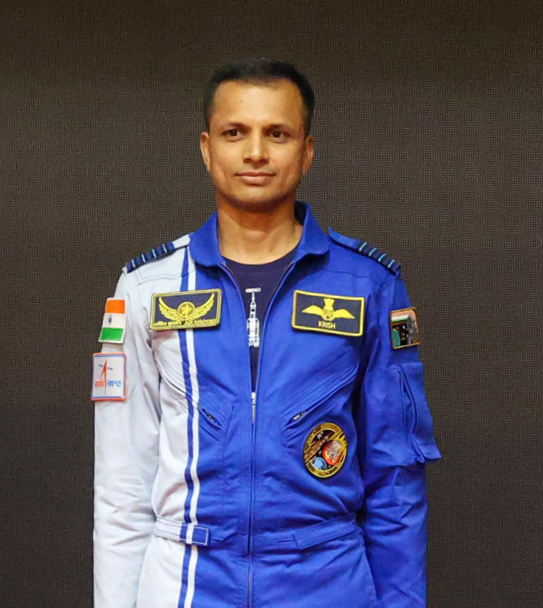
- Krishnan in 2024
- Born: 19 April 1982 (age 44); Chennai, Tamil Nadu, India
- Education: Jawaharlal Nehru University (B.S.); National Defence Academy; Indian Air Force Academy; Indian Institute of Science (M.Tech.); Defence Services Staff College
- Occupations: Astronaut; Test pilot
- Space career

ISRO astronaut
- Selection: 1st Gaganyatri Group (2019)
- Military career
- Allegiance: India
- Branch: Indian Air Force
- Service years: 2003–present
- Rank: Group captain
- Unit: Indian Air Force
- Combat operations: Operation Sindoor

Ajit Krishnan (born 19 April 1982) is a group captain and test pilot with the Indian Air Force and gaganyatri (astronaut) with the Indian Space Research Organisation (ISRO). In 2019, he was one of the four men identified to be trained for the Gaganyaan mission of the ISRO, part of the Indian human spaceflight programme.

== Early life and education ==
Ajit Krishnan was born on 19 April 1982 in Chennai, Tamil Nadu. He completed his schooling at various Kendriya Vidyalayas across India. He joined the National Defence Academy as a cadet and graduated in 2002. He graduated from the Air Force Academy and received the President’s gold medal and the Sword of Honour for overall merit. He also attended the Defence Services Staff College in Wellington, Tamil Nadu. He later completed a Master of Technology (by research) at the Indian Institute of Science, focusing on manual override techniques for de-orbiting maneuver of spacecraft. His thesis title was Comparison of On-Orbit Manual Attitude Control Methods for Non-Docking Spacecraft Through Virtual Reality Simulation and he published two research papers at IEEE SPACE conference.

== Defence career ==
Krishnan was commissioned into the fighter stream of the Indian Air Force on 21 June 2003. He has over 2,900 flying hours of experience, in aircraft such as Antonov An-32, Dornier Do 228, Mikoyan-Gurevich MiG-21, Mikoyan MiG-29, and Sukhoi Su-30 MKI. He initially served as a flying instructor before qualifying as a test pilot. He was promoted to the rank of wing commander in 2016 and to group captain in December 2020. After being deputed to Indian Space Research Organisation (ISRO), he was temporarily recalled to active operational duty in May 2025 during Operation Sindoor.

== Astronaut career ==
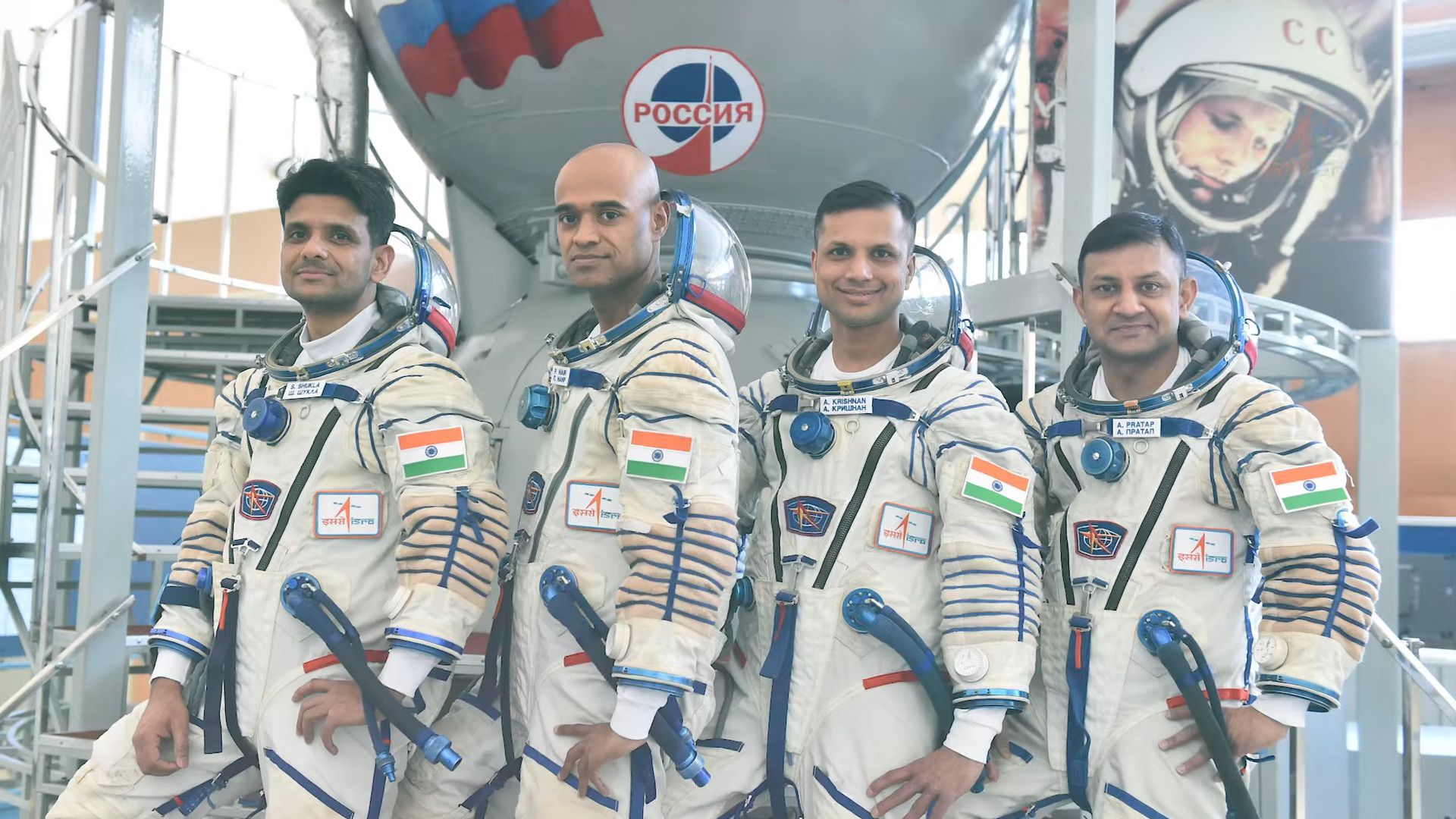
Krishnan (second from right) at the Yuri Gagarin Cosmonaut Training Center

In 2019, Krishnan was shortlisted by the Institute of Aerospace Medicine for the Gaganyaan programme of the ISRO. He was among four candidates selected for training as a part of the Indian Human Spaceflight Programme. He trained at the Yuri Gagarin Cosmonaut Training Center in Russia from 2020 to 2021. He later underwent mission-specific training at ISRO's Astronaut Training Facility in Bengaluru.

On 27 February 2024, ISRO officially introduced Krishnan as a member of the astronaut team for Gaganyaan, India's planned first human spaceflight mission. As of 2025, he continued to train as part of the Gaganyaan crew, with the first crewed mission expected in 2027. Though he returned to active duty with the Indian Air Force for a short period in May 2025, ISRO clarified that it did not affect his position as an astronaut-designate.
