= P. Radhakrishnan (scientist) =

Indian physicist

- Born: 10 October 1943 (age 82); Thiruvananthapuram, Kerala, India
- Education: Master of Science in physics
- Alma mater: University of Kerala
- Occupations: Scientist, author, speaker
- Years active: 1966–present
- Employer: Government of India
- Organization: Indian Space Research Organization
- Notable work: A Brief History of Rocketry in ISRO

P. Radhakrishan (Nair, Paramaswaran Radhakrishnan) is a veteran space scientist, author and speaker from India. He retired from the Indian Space Research Organisation as the Deputy Director of Liquid Propulsion Systems Centre. Radhakrishnan was one of the two trainees slated to travel to space in the STS-61-I (Challenger) mission in September 1986 as a Payload Specialist for INSAT-1C, but the flight was cancelled after the Challenger disaster. N.C.Bhat from ISRO Satellite centre was the other Indian space scientist who was trained by NASA for the mission – the plan was to select one of these two for the mission.

== Early life ==
Born in Thiruvananthapuram in 1943, Radhakrishnan completed his Bachelor of Science in Physics and Mathematics from University College Thiruvananthapuram in 1963. In 1965 he completed his Master of Science in Physics from the same college.

== Career ==
Radhakrishnan joined the Indian Space Research Organization (ISRO) in 1966 and was involved in the development of India's early satellites like Aryabhata, Rohini and APPLE, and later the Insat satellites. He was part of the Programme Planning & Evaluation Group at VSSC, and later became the Group Director of the Electronics Division. During the 1984–1986 period – as part of the evaluation to be a Payload Specialist in the STS-61-I (Challenger) mission – he went through extensive tests and training at the Institute of Aviation Medicine, Bangalore and the Johnson Space Center. He retired from the ISRO's LPSC as the center's deputy director for systems reliability & quality assurance.
