= Axiom Mission 4 =

Private crewed spaceflight to the International Space Station in 2025

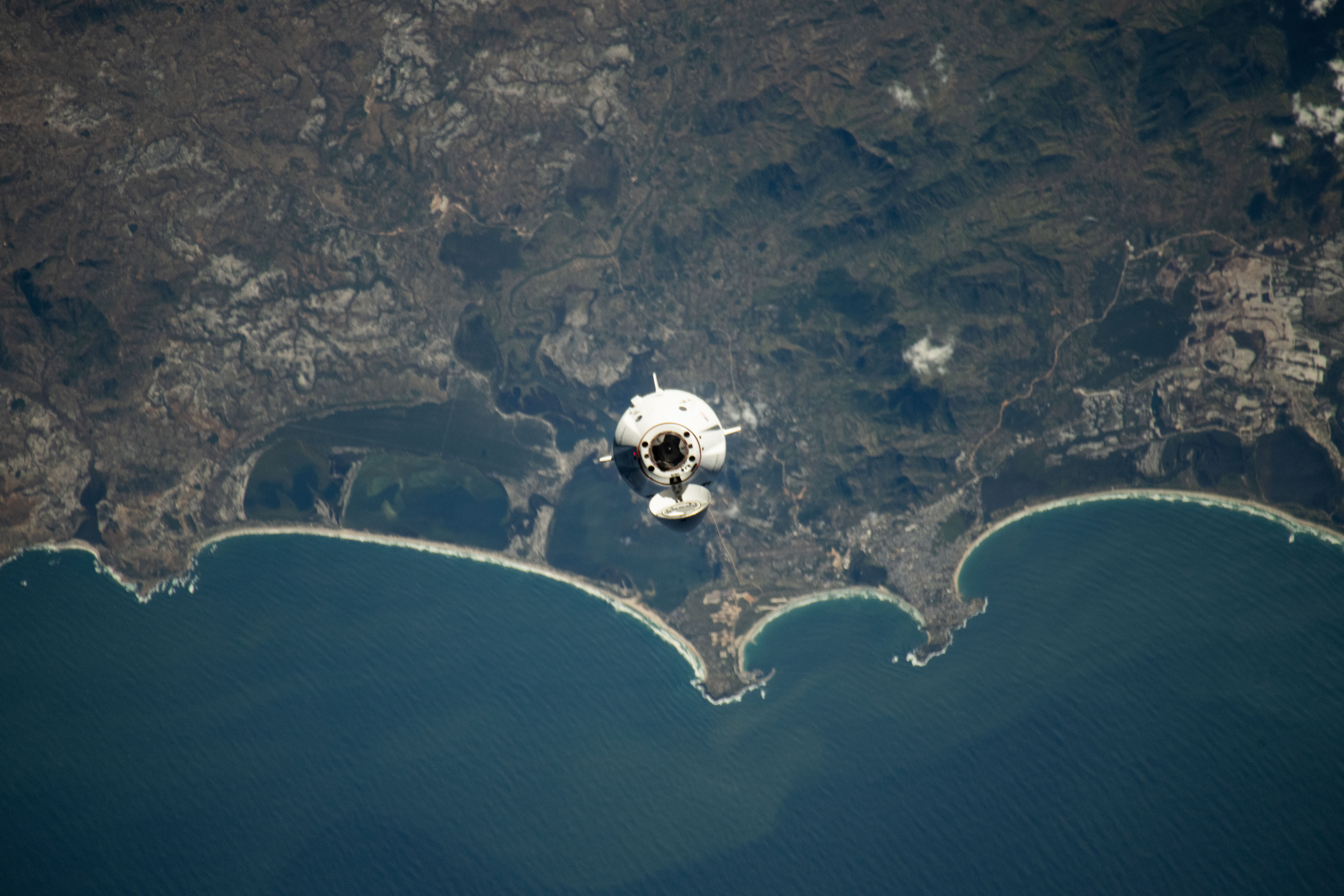
- Crew Dragon Grace approaching the ISS.
- Names: Ax-4
- Mission type: Private spaceflight to the ISS
- Operator: Axiom Space; SpaceX
- COSPAR ID: 2025-136A
- SATCAT no.: 64593
- Mission duration: 20 days, 2 hours and 59 minutes

Spacecraft properties
- Spacecraft: Crew Dragon Grace
- Spacecraft type: Crew Dragon
- Manufacturer: SpaceX

Crew
- Crew size: 4
- Members: Peggy Whitson; Shubhanshu Shukla; Sławosz Uznański-Wiśniewski; Tibor Kapu

Start of mission
- Launch date: June 25, 2025, 06:31:53 UTC (2:31:53 am EDT)
- Rocket: Falcon 9 Block 5 B1094-2, Flight 495
- Launch site: Kennedy, LC‑39A
- Contractor: SpaceX

End of mission
- Recovered by: MV Shannon
- Landing date: July 15, 2025, 09:31:41 UTC (2:31:41 am PDT)
- Landing site: Pacific Ocean near San Diego (32.6°N 117.7°W)

Orbital parameters
- Reference system: Geocentric orbit
- Regime: Low Earth orbit
- Inclination: 51.64°

Docking with ISS
- Docking port: Harmony zenith
- Docking date: June 26, 2025, 10:31:47 UTC
- Undocking date: July 14, 2025, 11:15 UTC
- Time docked: 18 days, 43 minutes
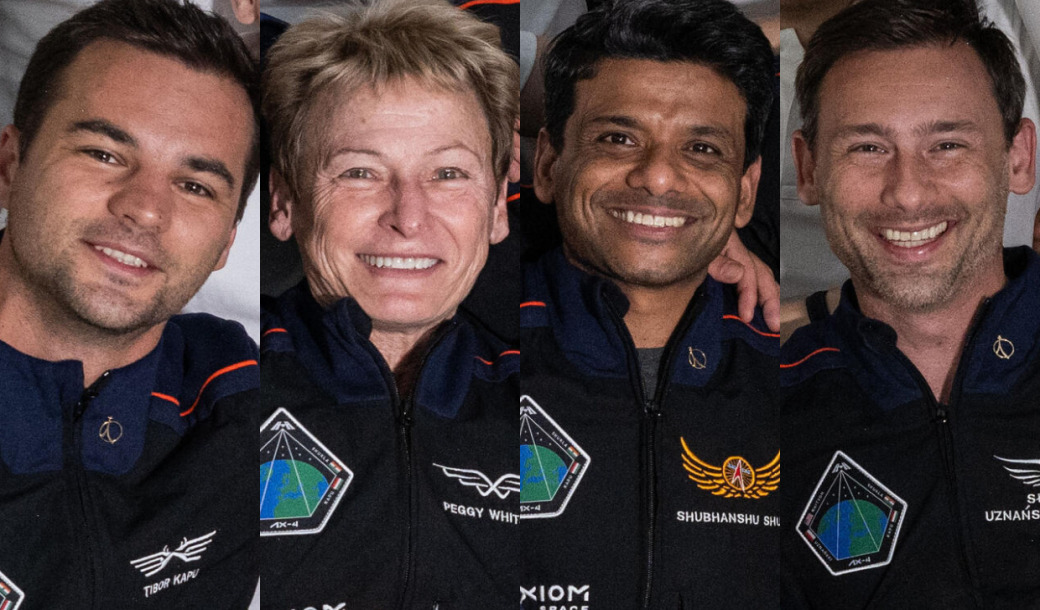
- From left to right: Axiom mission patch, Uznański-Wiśniewski's Ignis mission patch, Kapu's Hunor mission patch From left to right: Kapu, Whitson, Shukla, and Uznański-Wiśniewski Axiom Space missions Crew Dragon flights

Axiom Mission 4 (Ax‑4) was a private crewed spaceflight to the International Space Station (ISS) operated by Axiom Space in partnership with SpaceX and NASA. The mission launched atop a SpaceX Falcon 9 Block 5 rocket, which placed the Crew Dragon Grace spacecraft into low Earth orbit. Ax-4 was the first mission to fly aboard the Crew Dragon capsule 'Grace' (C213), which is the fifth and final Dragon capsule manufactured.

The launch was originally scheduled for June 11, 2025 from Launch Complex 39A at the Kennedy Space Center, but was scrubbed for a liquid oxygen leak. A separate leak in the ISS's Zvezda module led to an additional two week launch delay. The mission was eventually launched on June 25, 2025 at 06:31:53 UTC (2:31:53 a.m. EDT) for an 18-day stay at the ISS before undocking and splashing down in the Pacific Ocean off the coast of San Diego on July 15, 2025 at 09:31:41 UTC (2:31:41 am PDT).

== Crew ==
The four-person crew included commander Peggy Whitson, an Axiom Space employee and former NASA astronaut; pilot Shubhanshu Shukla of the Indian Space Research Organisation (ISRO); and mission specialists Sławosz Uznański-Wiśniewski, a European Space Agency (ESA) project astronaut from Poland, and Tibor Kapu, representing the Hungarian Space Office.

The mission marked the first government-sponsored human spaceflight in over 40 years, and only the second overall, for India, Hungary, and Poland. Each of these countries previously flew one astronaut as part of the Soviet Union's Interkosmos program. While those earlier missions docked with Salyut 6 or Salyut 7, Ax-4 was the first government-sponsored mission from any of the three nations to reach the ISS. (Note: Charles Simonyi, who was born in Hungary, flew on two privately funded trips to the ISS on Soyuz TMA-10 and TMA-14 under the US flag.) Among the crew, Shubhanshu Shukla was the first member of India's astronaut corps to fly in space.

Prime crew
Position	Astronaut
Commander	(United States) Peggy Whitson, Axiom Space; Fifth spaceflight
Pilot	(India) Shubhanshu Shukla, ISRO; First spaceflight
Mission specialist	(Poland) Sławosz Uznański-Wiśniewski, ESA; First spaceflight
Mission specialist	(Hungary) Tibor Kapu, HSO; First spaceflight

Backup crew
Position	Astronaut
Commander	(United States) Michael López-Alegría, Axiom Space
Pilot	(India) Prasanth Nair, ISRO
Mission specialist	(Hungary) Gyula Cserényi, HSO

== Gaganyaan ==
Ax‑4 represented a milestone for the Indian Human Spaceflight Programme, integrating with ISRO's Gaganyaan initiative. While Gaganyaan remained India's independent crewed program, Ax‑4 provided the first opportunity for an Indian astronaut—Shubhanshu Shukla—to fly on a commercial mission to the ISS. Shukla conducted experiments developed by ISRO and Indian institutions, including studies of cognitive effects of screen use, microbial adaptation, muscle atrophy, and crop resilience in microgravity.

According to ISRO, the mission provided practical experience in the intricacies of crew-ground coordination, real-time health telemetry, medical and psychological preparation, international crew integration, and experiment execution. For the Indian Human Spaceflight Programme, it will have a direct impact on astronaut preparedness, safety validation, and mission planning.

=== Experiments ===
The experiments are co-ordinated by ISRO.

- Space Microalgae (International Centre for Genetic Engineering and Biotechnology (ICGEB) & National Institute of Plant Genome Research (NIPGR), India)— Impact of Microgravity and Radiation in ISS on Edible Microalgae.
- Myogenesis (The Institute for Stem Cell Science and Regenerative Medicine (InStem), India) — Effect of metabolic supplements on muscle regeneration under microgravity.
- Sprouts (University of Agricultural Sciences, Dharwad & Indian Institute of Technology, Dharwad) — Sprouting Salad Seeds in Space: Relevance to Crew Nutrition.
- Voyager Tardigrade (Indian Institute of Science) — Survival, revival, reproduction, and transcriptome of the eutardigrade Paramacrobiotus sp. BLR strain in space.
- Voyager Displays (Indian Institute of Science) — Analyzing Human Interaction with Electronic Displays in Microgravity. The study will compare performance of on board and ground crews with respect to ISO 9241 pointing task, Spatial 2-back task, Perceived Stress and WHO Mental Well Being tests.
- Cyanobacteria in Microgravity (International Centre for Genetic Engineering and Biotechnology (ICGEB)) — Comparative growth and proteomics responses of cyanobacteria on urea and nitrate in microgravity.
- Food Crop Seeds in Microgravity (Indian Institute of Space Science and Technology & Kerala Agricultural University) — Impact of Microgravity on Growth and Yield Parameters in Food Crop Seeds.

== HUNOR ==
Ax‑4 also carried Tibor Kapu, Hungary's second astronaut after Bertalan Farkas. (Note: In 2007 Hungarian-American buissnessman Charles Simonyi flew as a space tourist to the ISS on Soyuz TMA-10, although he is often omitted as an official "astronaut.") Tibor Kapu was the first Hungarian astronaut since the fall of the Soviet Union and the first to board the International Space Station. Although Hungary is also part of the ESA, the HUNOR (short for HUNgarian to ORbit) mission was developed by the Hungarian Space Office (HSO) completely independent of ESA. HUNOR was first announced in 2021 and in July 2022 the Hungarian foreign ministry signed a preliminary deal with Axiom for the flight, which was finalized in September 2023. Tibor Kapu was selected from 247 applicants to fly on the mission, supported by backup astronaut Gyula Cserényi. Kapu is a mechanical engineer and recreational skydiver, Cserényi is an electrical engineer and amateur steeplechase racer. Both completed their NASA training in April 2025. The HUNOR mission had its own patch, separate from the Axiom Mission 4 patch, depicting the Csodaszarvas and four stars representing the final astronaut candidates.

=== Experiments ===
- ATMP (Semmelweis University, 27G-Technology Ltd.) — development of heart muscle cells in space environment
- CINCINNATI (eCon Kft.) — simulation of thermal comfort for astronauts
- DIROS (Eötvös Loránd University, Faculty of Science, Institute of Physics and Astronomy, SGF Kft.) — contributes to better understanding of the Saturn's hexagon cloud pattern and flows in gases or liquids
- DNA-REPAIR (University of Szeged) — reducing damage to DNA-molecules to protect astronauts from cosmic rays using genetically modified fruit flies (Drosophila melanogaster), that are to be tested and compared with specimens on Earth
- END-SANS (Spinsplit Kft.) — experiment to treat astronauts' visual impairment that is caused by long periods in space
- ENPERCHAR (Eötvös Loránd University, Faculty of Education and Psychology, Institute of People–Environment Transaction) — the research explores the interaction (transaction) between humans and their physical environment on the International Space Station
- ESEL3D (University of Pécs) — impact of space conditions on 3D printed devices
- IMU-DRS (HUN-REN Alfréd Rényi Institute of Mathematics) — positioning in space using accelerometers
- KRIJAP (HUN-REN Research Centre for Natural Sciences) — crystal growth from new organic material in zero gravity, with resulting crystals to be brought to Earth where their atomic structure is to be determined
- M4D (Aedus Space Kft.) — medicine tester that uses capillary action to make sure ingredients mix precisely at the right time and place
- MAGOR (University of Szeged) — examining damage to the astronauts' microbiome and negative impact on their health caused by weightlessness, cosmic radiation and special diets
- MAGYAR (University of Pécs) — testing brain function in weightlessness using VR
- MICATO (Triage Capital Zrt.) — testing ion engines in microgravity
- ORBGEO (Space Apps Kft.) — tracking the orbit of spacecraft using photographs
- POSITIVE (ADMATIS Kutató, Gyártó és Kereskedelmi Kft.) — foaming of building material from lunar regolith
- RANDAM (27G-Technology Kft.) — usage of a new, tiny, energy-efficient radiation dosimeter that also records scientific data on other environmental factors
- SAET (University of Szeged) — the impact of space travel on associative learning (Space Acquired Equivalence Test)
- SINGREAD (Észak-Pesti Centrumkórház–Honvédkórház) — studying the human voice in space
- SIS (University of Pécs) — 3D footage of the astronaut's daily activities (Step in Space)
- TESH (Európai Tudásközpont Fejlesztő, Szolgáltató és Kereskedelmi Kft., Semmelweis University, Budapest University of Technology and Economics, German Aerospace Center (DLR), Canadian Space Agency (CSA)) — health assessment of astronauts
- UHU (HUN-REN Institute of Earth Physics and Space Science) — photographing upper-atmospheric lightning, namely sprites, blue and gigantic jets from the ISS
- VISPRO (University of Debrecen) — vascular ultrasound examination in weightlessness
- VITAPRIC (University of Debrecen, University of Pécs) — examining space conditions on vitamin, mineral and protein content of plant samples

== Ignis ==
For Poland, Ax‑4 was the first crewed mission since 1978. The Polish Space Agency (POLSA) and the European Space Agency (ESA) have partnered on the Ignis mission for astronaut Sławosz Uznański-Wiśniewski. He was the second ESA astronaut to fly on a commercial human spaceflight mission. His payload suite included experiments in technology and life sciences.

=== Mission patch ===
The Ignis mission had its own patch, separate from the Axiom Mission 4 patch, depicting an eagle in the Polish colors whose wings trace the contours of the Orla Perć mountain range and a stylized depiction of the Scutum constellation (a tribute to Johannes Hevelius who named the constellation) over the mission's name, Ignis, the Latin word for fire.

=== Training ===
Before the mission, Sławosz Uznański-Wiśniewski trained at facilities in Europe, Japan, and the United States. At the European Astronaut Centre in Cologne, he focused on the experiments he will perform and on ESA's Columbus laboratory module. At JAXA's Tsukuba Space Center in Japan, his training covered the operation of the Japanese Experiment Module Kibō. In the United States, he trained at various NASA facilities, as well as at facilities of SpaceX and Axiom Space. His preparation also included parabolic flights and outdoor survival training.

=== Experiments ===
- AstroMentalHealth (University of Silesia) — impact of isolation, technology, and limited contact with nature on astronauts' mental health
- AstroPerformance (Mollis Textus) (Smarter Diagnostics) — studying the impact of spaceflight on the soft tissues of the musculoskeletal system
- EEG Neurofeedback (Academy of Physical Education and Sport in Gdańsk) — electroencephalography for supporting astronauts' mental resilience and focus
- Human Gut Microbiota (Military University of Technology) — study of changes in the community of microorganisms in the digestive system during spaceflight
- Immune Multiomics (Military University of Technology) — effects of the space environment on gene expression and DNA methylation in blood mononuclear cells
- Leopard Data Processing Unit (KP Labs) — demonstrating AI‑based data processing in orbit to reduce ground infrastructure requirements
- MXene in LEO (AGH University of Krakow) — stability of MXene-type nanomaterials in space conditions and their use in wearable devices
- PhotonGrav (Cortivision) — testing functional near-infrared spectroscopy-based brain-computer interface
- RadMon-on-ISS (SigmaLabs) — scalable radiation detectors
- Space Volcanic Algae (Extremo Technologies) — survival and adaptation of extremophilic volcanic microalgae in space conditions
- Stability of Drugs (Polish Academy of Sciences) — stability of polymeric drug release systems in space conditions
- Wireless Acoustics (Svantek) — noise measurements in the ESA Columbus module using an acoustic monitor and a personal dosimeter
- Yeast TardigradeGene (University of Szczecin, Adam Mickiewicz University, and University of Silesia) — survival and energy state of tardigrade-gene-infused yeast in space conditions

== Mission ==
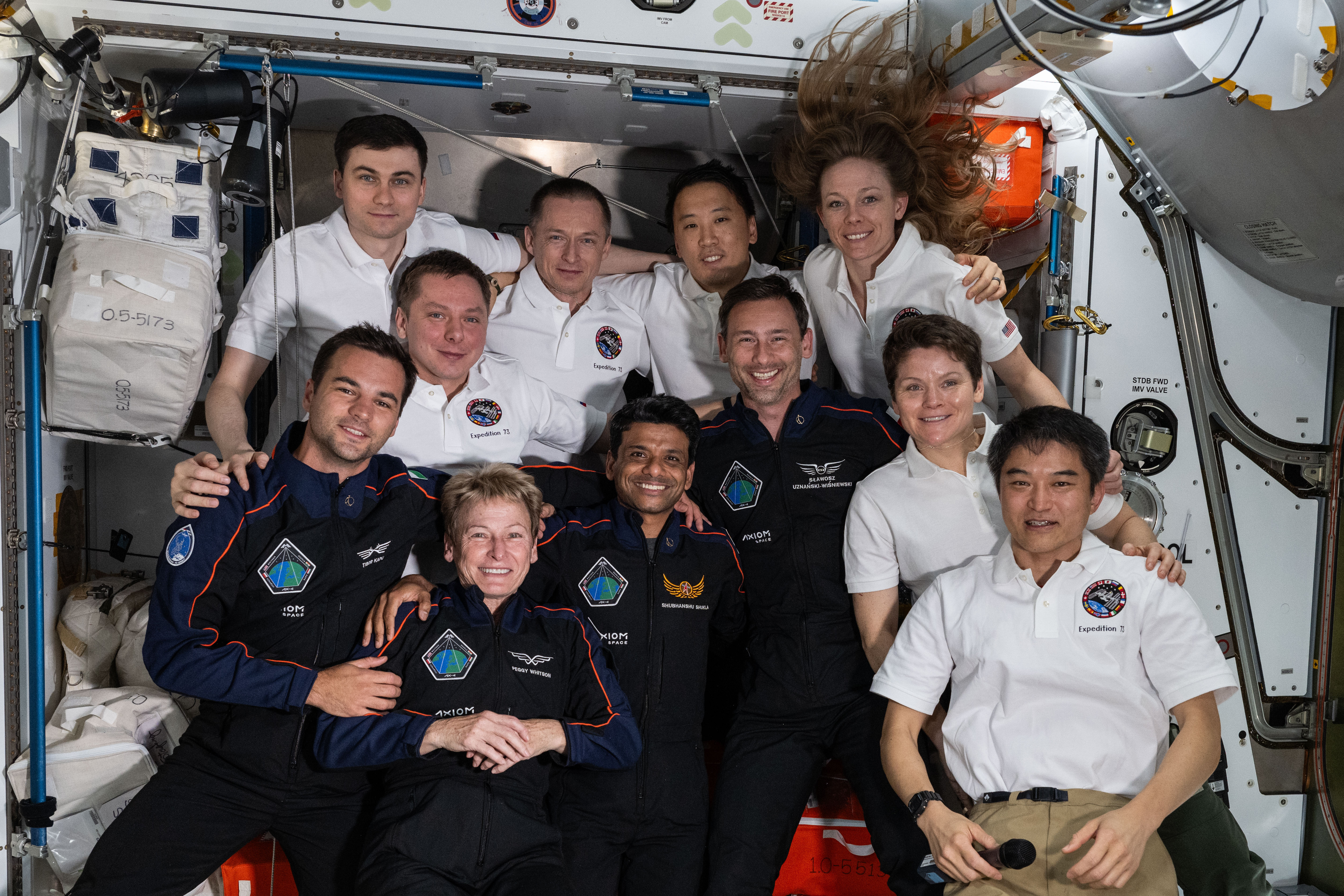
Axiom Mission 4 crew in black jumpsuits, from left: Kapu, Whitson, Shukla, and Uznański-Wiśniewski with Expedition 73 crew in white shirts

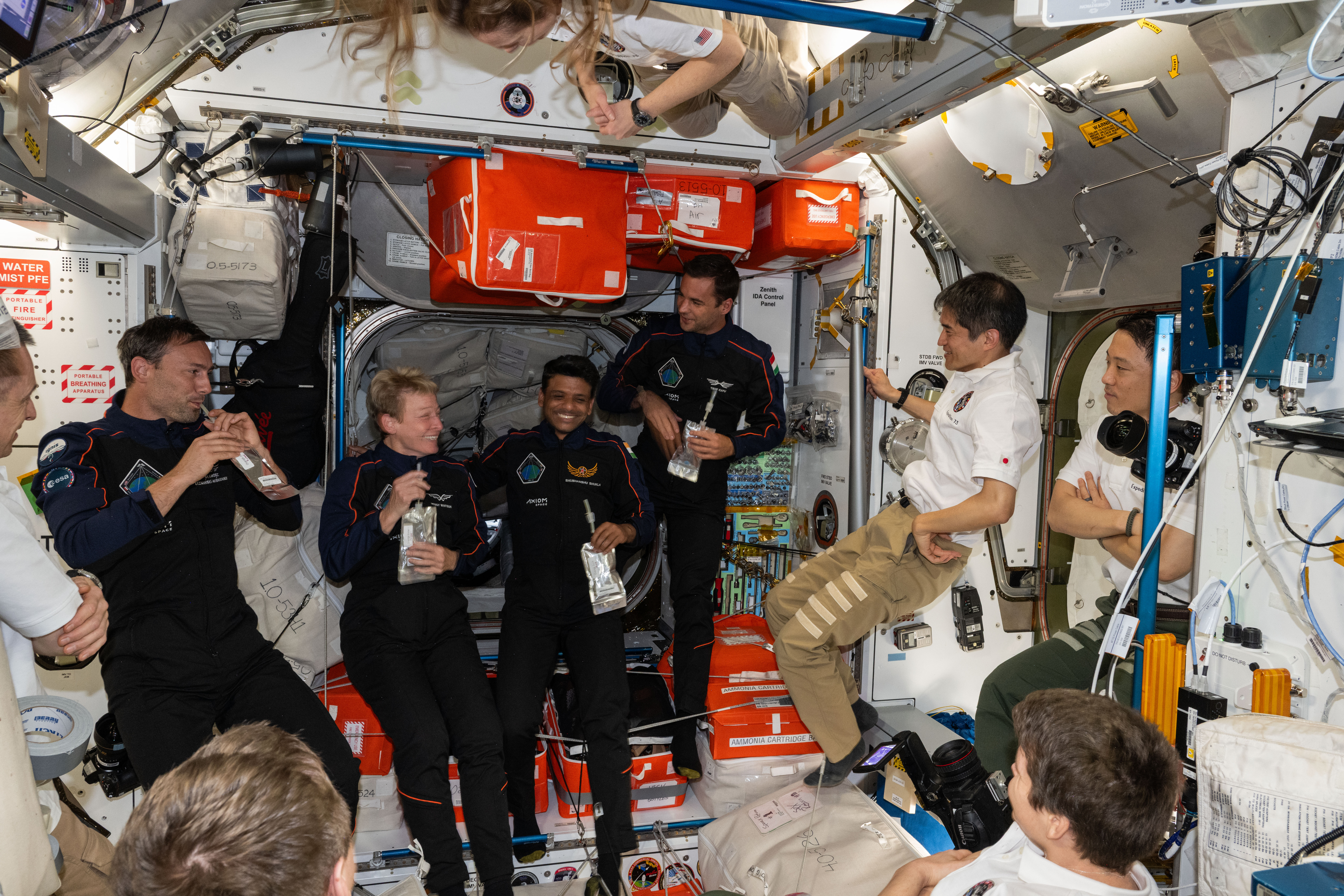
Axiom Mission 4 crew (in dark suits) gather with drink pouches shortly after docking

Attempt	Planned	Result	Turnaround	Reason	Decision point	Weather go (%)	Notes
1	11 Jun 2025, 8:00:00 am	Scrubbed	—	Technical	10 Jun 2025, 8:45 pm		Liquid oxygen leak found on rocket following static fire. Launch scheduled for 8:00 UTC and scrubbed at 20:45 UTC.
2	22 Jun 2025, 3:42:00 am	Scrubbed	10 days 19 hours 42 minutes	Technical	19 Jun 2025, 6:48 pm		Air leak in Zvezda ISS module. Scrubbed at 18:48 UTC.
3	25 Jun 2025, 2:31:53 am	Success	2 days 22 hours 50 minutes				Launched at 06:31 UTC.

On June 10, 2025, the launch of Ax-4 was postponed after SpaceX detected a liquid oxygen leak in the Falcon 9 rocket during a post-static fire inspection. The mission was put on hold to allow time for necessary repairs. SpaceX officially announced it was "standing down" from the launch to ensure the safety and integrity of the mission hardware.

On June 12, 2025, the mission was delayed to allow the crew of the space station to investigate a new potential pressure leak. The potential leak was detected following leak repair and sealing efforts by Russian cosmonauts in the aft segment of the Zvezda module, where multiple previous leaks have occurred. On June 19, 2025, NASA made the decision to stand down from a launch on June 22, 2025.

Because of the multiple stand downs in close succession, Axiom-4 crew remained in quarantine for nearly four weeks, one of the longest periods in modern human spaceflight history. The standard quarantine for astronauts is typically just two weeks, although the Apollo Moon mission astronauts were isolated for three weeks.

The mission launched successfully on its third attempt on June 25, 2025 at 06:31:53 UTC (2:31:53 a.m. EDT). Grace docked with the ISS on June 26, 2025, at 10:31:47 UTC for a two-week stay.

After 18 days at the ISS, Grace undocked on July 14, 2025, 11:15 UTC, commencing a 22-hour return to Earth. The spacecraft splashed down in the Pacific Ocean off the coast of San Diego on July 15, 2025 at 09:31:41 UTC (2:31:41 am PDT).

== See also ==
- Expedition 73
- Timeline of private spaceflight
- List of European Space Agency programmes and missions
- List of ISRO missions
