= Gaganyaan-3 =

Indian spaceflight, planned 2026

- Names: G3
- Mission type: Uncrewed flight test
- Operator: ISRO

Spacecraft properties
- Spacecraft: Gaganyaan
- Manufacturer: Hindustan Aeronautics Limited

Start of mission
- Launch date: 2026 (planned)
- Rocket: HLVM3
- Launch site: Satish Dhawan Space Centre

Orbital parameters
- Reference system: Geocentric orbit
- Regime: Low Earth orbit

Gaganyaan-3 (from Sanskrit: gagana, "celestial" and yāna, "craft, vehicle") will be the third uncrewed test flight of the Gaganyaan programme, with launch planned in 2026.

== Mission objective ==
The mission is planned to last from eight hours to a day of flight. The environmental and life support systems, which includes maintaining temperatures between 25°C and 27°C, removing carbon dioxide, and maintaining the oxygen and nitrogen ratio will also be rigorously tested by the humanoid robot flying the spacecraft.
