= Indian Human Spaceflight Programme =

Government programme

Indian Human Spaceflight programme
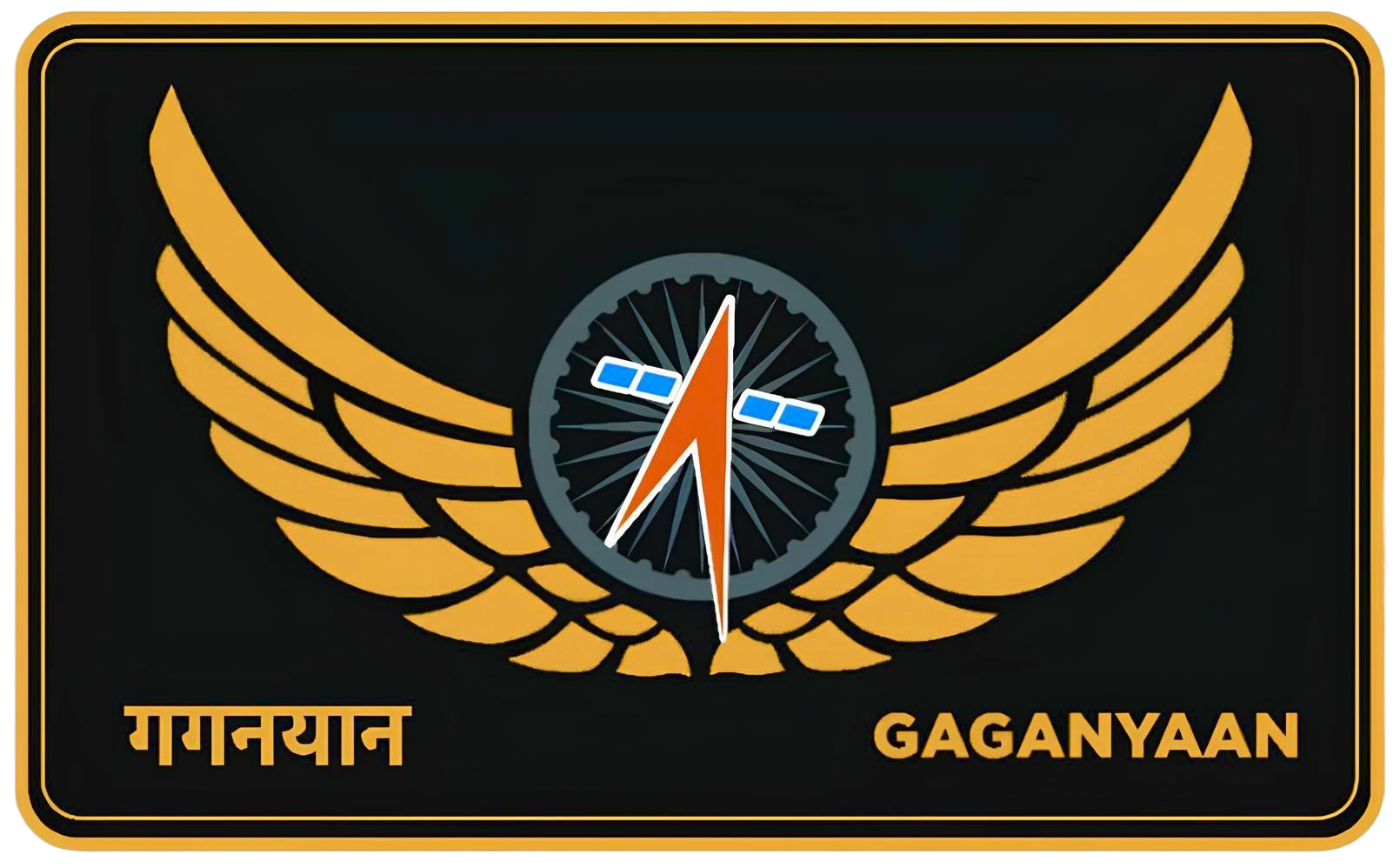
- Gaganyaan astronaut insignia

Program overview
- Country: India
- Organization: Human Space Flight Centre (ISRO)
- Purpose: Human spaceflight
- Status: Active

Programme history
- Cost: ₹20,193 crore (US$2.2 billion)
- Duration: 2006–present
- First flight: Gaganyaan-1 (H2 2026)
- First crewed flight: Gaganyaan-4 (NET Q2 2027)
- Launch site: Satish Dhawan Space Centre

Vehicle information
- Launch vehicle: LVM3 (planned)

The Indian Human Spaceflight Programme (or the Gaganyaan programme) is an ongoing project by ISRO to develop the technology needed to launch crewed spacecraft into low Earth orbit.

Before the Gaganyaan programme announcement in August 2018, human spaceflight was not a priority for ISRO, though related technologies have been developed since 2007, and it performed a Crew Module Atmospheric Re-entry Experiment and a Pad Abort Test for the programme. In December 2018, the Indian government approved a further ₹100 billion (US$1.5 billion) for a 7-day crewed flight of 2–3 astronauts. Three uncrewed flights, named Gaganyaan-1, Gaganyaan-2 and Gaganyaan-3 are scheduled to launch in the 2020s, followed by a crewed flight on an HLVM3 rocket. To date, mission has been postponed several times until all certification requirements are completed.

If completed successfully, India will become the fourth nation to conduct independent human spaceflight after the Soviet Union (Russia), United States, and China. After conducting the first crewed spaceflights, the agency intends to start a space station programme, crewed lunar landings, and crewed interplanetary missions in the long term.

== History ==
Patch of Indian Cosmonaut Mission 1 in 1984

=== Soyuz and early achievement ===
On 3 April 1984, Rakesh Sharma became the first Indian citizen to travel to space on board Soyuz T-11 as part of the Interkosmos programme, visiting Salyut 7. The mission was launched on board a Soviet rocket and was not part of an independent Indian programme, but it became the starting point for India's manned space adventure.

On 9 August 2007, the then Chairman of the ISRO, G. Madhavan Nair, indicated the agency was "seriously considering" the creation of a human spaceflight programme. He further indicated that within a year, ISRO would report on its development of new space capsule technologies. Development of a fully autonomous orbital vehicle to carry a two-member crew into low Earth orbit (LEO) began a few months after that, when the government allocated ₹95 crore (US$10.1 million) for pre-programme initiatives for 2007 through 2008. A crewed orbital spaceflight would require about ₹12,400 crore (US$1.3 billion) and a period of seven years of development. The Planning Commission estimated that a budget of ₹5,000 crore (US$534.2 million) was required for initial work during 2007–2012 for the crewed spaceflight. In February 2009, the Government of India authorised the human space flight programme, but fell short of fully funding or creating it.

The trials for crewed space missions began in 2007 with the 600 kg Space Capsule Recovery Experiment (SRE), launched using the Polar Satellite Launch Vehicle (PSLV) rocket, and safely returned to Earth 12 days later. This was followed by the Crew Module Atmospheric Re-entry Experiment and the Pad Abort Test in 2018. This enabled the ISRO to develop heat-resistant materials, technology, and procedures necessary for human space travel.

As per the memorandum of understanding (MoU), Defence Research and Development Organisation (DRDO) will provide support for the programme with critical human-centric systems and technologies like space-grade food, crew healthcare, radiation measurement and protection, parachutes for safe recovery of the crew module, and fire suppression systems. The Defence Food Research Laboratory (DFRL) has worked on space food for the crew and has conducted trials on a G-suit for astronauts as well. A prototype called the Advanced Crew Escape Suit weighing 13 kg and built by Sure Safety (India) Private Limited has been tested and performance verified. While the crew module is designed to carry a total of three passengers, the maiden crewed mission may only have one or two crewmembers on board.

=== Approval of the programme ===
All preliminary tests being successful, the decisive push for the creation of the Human Spaceflight Programme (HSP) took place in 2017, and it was accepted and formally announced by Prime Minister Narendra Modi on 15 August 2018. The funding is approximately Rs 10,000 crore. The testing phase was expected to begin in December 2020, and the first crewed mission was to be undertaken in December 2021. However, on 11 June 2020, it was announced that the overall schedule for the Gaganyaan launches had been postponed due to the impact of the COVID-19 pandemic in India, in turn revising the timetable for the HSP. As of December 2022, the first uncrewed test flight is scheduled to launch no earlier than mid-2024, with the uncrewed second and crewed third flights to follow afterward.

As per ISRO, the initial review process is complete for food, potable water, emergency first aid kits, and health monitoring systems for the Gaganyaan programme through 16 March 2021. ISRO and the CNES joint working group on the HSP are collaborating on space medicine for the programme. India has also maintained long-standing space relationship with Russia, like examples of international friendship and cooperations with ROSCOSMOS. Four new Indian astronauts for the first human mission trained at Russia's Yuri Gagarin cosmonaut training center, experts were dispatched to the center for an exchange program, and the two countries have an agreement for developing the mission's technology.

=== Progress in personal affairs ===
On 4 August 2024, ISRO, NASA and SpaceX announced that an Indian astronaut, Shubhanshu Shukla, would serve as a pilot on board Axiom Mission 4, a private Crew Dragon mission to the International Space Station (ISS). He became the second-ever Indian to travel to space, first Indian space tourist, with the express goal of gaining experience for future ISRO missions. The mission was launched on 25 June 2025. At the 9th meeting of the India-USA Civil Space Joint Working Group, proposal for future Gaganyaan Docking to the International Space Station and joint development of EVA and EMU suits as well as ccollaborations in Space medicine and LEO and lunar mission management control are expected to be discussed.

== Spacecraft development ==
Gaganyaan launch schedule
Mission	Launch date	Crew	Launch vehicle	Duration	Goal	Status
Gaganyaan-1	Q4 2025	—N/a	LVM3	2 days	Technology demonstration	Under integration and testing
Gaganyaan-2	NET 2026	—N/a	LVM3	2 days	Technology demonstration mission carrying Vyommitra, the humanoid robot	Planned
Gaganyaan-3	NET 2026	—N/a	LVM3	2 days	Technology demonstration with Vyommitra	Planned
Gaganyaan-4	NET 2027	(India) Shubhanshu Shukla (India) TBD	LVM3	TBD	First crewed flight	Planned

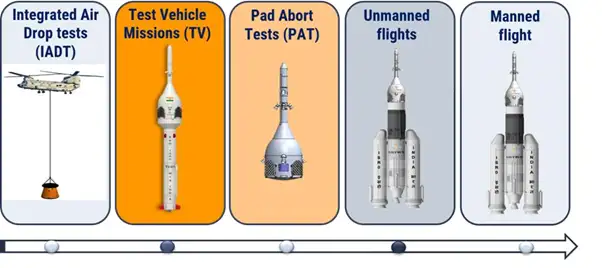
Gaganyaan development timeline

The first phase of the programme is to develop and fly the 3.7 t (8,200 lb) Gaganyaan spacecraft with the capacity to carry a three-member crew to LEO and safely return to Earth, after a mission duration of a few orbits to two days. The extendable version of the spacecraft will allow flights up to seven days, and have rendezvous and docking capability. Before the flight of the Gaganyaan module, Group Captain Shubhanshu Shukla flew on the Axiom-4 mission to the ISS.

In the next phase, the development of a small habitat is planned, allowing spaceflight durations of 30–40 days. Further advances based on experience have the goal of developing a space station.

On 7 October 2016, Vikram Sarabhai Space Centre Director K. Sivan stated that ISRO was gearing up to conduct a critical crew bailout test called the Pad Abort Test to see how fast and effectively the crew module could be released safely in the event of an emergency. The tests were conducted successfully on 5 July 2018, at Satish Dhawan Space Centre on Sriharikota. This was the first of a series of tests to qualify the launch escape system. Parachute tests were scheduled before the end of 2019, and multiple in-flight abort tests were planned starting mid-2020.

India will not use any animals for life support system testing, but robots resembling humans instead. ISRO is targeting more than 99.8% reliability for its launch escape system.

ISRO plans to launch its crewed orbiter Gaganyaan atop a Launch Vehicle Mark 3 (LVM3). About 16 minutes after lift-off, the rocket will inject the orbital vehicle into an orbit 300 to 400 km above Earth. The capsule will return for a splashdown in the Arabian Sea near the Gujarat coastline. As of May 2019, the design of the crew module was complete. The spacecraft will be flown twice uncrewed for validation before conducting a crewed spaceflight. As of January 2020, the crew module was due to undergo testing in the wind tunnel facility of the Council of Scientific and Industrial Research (CSIR) at the National Aerospace Laboratories (NAL). The spacecraft will carry one crewmember in its maiden crewed mission to an orbit of 400 km (250 mi).

The first uncrewed flight will involve the launch of a 5,000 kg (11,000 lb) module which, after orbiting will re-enter the atmosphere and decelerate at an altitude of 7 km (4.3 mi) before splashing down.

== Infrastructure development ==
=== Launch pad ===
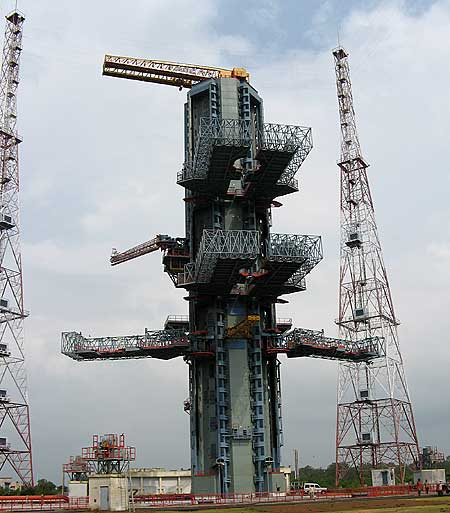
Second Launch Pad of the Satish Dhawan Space Centre

India's maiden crewed mission is expected to take off from the Satish Dhawan Space Centre's Second Launch Pad. In November 2019, ISRO sought out contractors for augmenting the pad. A third launch pad in Sriharikota has been proposed for India's future launch vehicles and crewed missions. Systems for crew ingress and egress, an access platform, recovery setup for emergencies during the flight's ascent phase, and a module preparation facility for assembly and testing will be built. All the facilities will be connected to an upcoming Gaganyaan control facility which will be built nearby to facilitate communication and monitor the crew capsule during flight.

=== Human-rating of LVM3 ===
2D representation of ISRO's human-rated LVM3 (HLVM3)

Human-rating certifies that a system is capable of safely transporting humans. ISRO will launch three missions to validate the human rating of the LVM3. Existing launch facilities will be upgraded to carry out launches under the HSP campaign.

ISRO has been modifying propulsion modules of various stages of the rocket for human rating. Theoretical parameters for human rating were expected to be achieved by August or September 2020 to be followed by simulations and three test launches.

=== Certification ===
ISRO is developing its own criteria to certify its spacecraft that will take humans to space.

=== Communication ===
The spacecraft is expected to communicate with ISTRAC and other partner antennae. For the initial test flights, terminal ships will be placed in the Pacific and Atlantic oceans to communicate with the spacecraft. A joint facility, managed by the Australian Space Agency and ISRO has been set up at the Cocos Islands to track the spacecraft during the Orbital Insertion phase. ISRO is planning to place chartered ships carrying a group of eight scientists to be stationed at observation points in the Pacific Ocean and the North Atlantic Ocean, to monitor the uncrewed mission. A consignment with a shipborne terminal (SBT), electronic equipment, MV-SAT antennas and its associated subsystems will be sent abroad from ISTRAC for deployment on these chartered ships. This is similar to what was done for the launch of the Mars Orbiter Mission.

Future flights are expected to also be SATCOM capable, talking to Indian geostationary communication satellites, as well as the planned IDRSS constellation. ISRO has also integrated communications with Amazon Web Services ground terminals and ESTRACK in Sweden. Feeder stations for the IDRSS constellation have been built at Byalalu and Shriharikota. Additional support will be provided by multiple Indian Naval stations and the GSAT communication satellites.The SPADEX and SARAL satellites have been used to test the ground communication networks.

== Experiments and objectives ==
On November 7, 2018, ISRO released an Announcement of Opportunity seeking proposals from the Indian science community for microgravity experiments that could be carried out during the first two uncrewed Gaganyaan flights. The scope of the experiments is not restricted, and other relevant ideas will be entertained. The proposed orbit for microgravity platform is expected to be in LEO at approximately 400 km altitude. All the proposed internal and external experimental payloads will undergo thermal, vacuum and radiation tests under the required temperature and pressure conditions. To carry out long-duration microgravity experiments, a satellite may be placed in orbit. Astronauts will perform four biological and two physical science experiments related to microgravity during the mission.

As of October 2021, ISRO selected five science experiments that will be conducted on Gaganyaan. The payloads will be developed by the Indian Institute of Space Science and Technology (IIST), University of Agricultural Sciences, Dharwad (UASD), Tata Institute of Fundamental Research (TIFR), IIT Patna, Indian Institute of Chemical Technology (IICT) and the Jawaharlal Nehru Centre for Advanced Scientific Research (JNCASR). Out of the five, two are biological experiments that will be conducted by IIST, UASD and TIFR and will include kidney stone formation and Sirtuin 1 gene marker effects in Drosophila melanogaster. IIT Patna will run experiments on a heat sink that can handle very high heat flux, IICT will study crystallization phenomena, and JNCASR will examine fluid mixing characteristics.

With an emphasis on microgravity research, space biomanufacturing, bioastronautics, and astrobiology, the Department of Biotechnology and the ISRO have signed a memorandum of understanding (MoU) on 25 October 2024 to collaborate on space biotechnology research. The application will be in ISRO's human space flight project, Gaganyaan. The MoU will address problems like food storage, radiation, microgravity, and constant nutrient supply, as well as health risks like cancer, cataracts, and loss of bone and muscle.

== Space station ==
India plans to deploy Bharatiya Antariksha Station, a 52-tonne space station, as a follow-up programme to the Gaganyaan missions. On June 13, 2019, ISRO Chief K. Sivan announced that India's space station will be deployed 5–7 years after the completion of the Gaganyaan programme, and that India will not join the International Space Station program. It is expected to be placed in an LEO of 400 km altitude, hosting a crew of three for 15–20 days. Final approval is expected to be given to the programme by the Indian government only after the completion of the Gaganyaan missions.

ISRO is working to develop spacecraft docking and berthing technology, with an initial funding of ₹10 crore cleared in 2017. A Space Docking Experiment, or SpaDeX, is under development, featuring signal analysis equipment, a high-precision videometer for navigation, docking system electronics and real-time decision making for landing systems. As part of the experiment, ISRO launched two small satellites for testing. This technology is crucial for a space station as it will enable the docking of spacecraft.

== See also ==
- Chandrayaan programme
- Indian Mars exploration missions
