= Gaganyaan-2 =

Indian spaceflight, planned 2026

- Names: G2
- Mission type: Uncrewed flight test
- Operator: ISRO

Spacecraft properties
- Spacecraft: Gaganyaan
- Manufacturer: Hindustan Aeronautics Limited

Start of mission
- Launch date: 2026 (planned)
- Rocket: HLVM3
- Launch site: Satish Dhawan Space Centre

Orbital parameters
- Reference system: Geocentric orbit
- Regime: Low Earth orbit

Gaganyaan-2 (from Sanskrit: gagana, "celestial" and yāna, "craft, vehicle") will be the second uncrewed test flight of the Gaganyaan programme, with launch planned in 2026.

== Mission objective ==
Gaganyaan-2 will be the first uncrewed flight of Gaganyaan capsule, operated by ISRO. It will carry Vyommitra the humanoid robot for testing purposes.

== Manufacturing ==
The fourth set of the Crew Escape Ogive Shroud (CEOS), a part of Crew Escape System for the Gaganyaan-2 mission, was delivered by L&T Precision Engineering and Systems on 9 November 2026. In addition to parts for the Crew Escape System, the facility produces a number of subsystems for the Gaganyaan programme, including Pitch Motor Compartment (PMC), Crew Escape System Jettisoning Motor (CJM), Low-altitude escape motor structures, High-altitude escape motor Thrust-transfer structure (HTS), Crew Module Apex Cover (CMAC), and Crew Module structures.
