= Group captain (India) =

Indian Air Force rank

Group Captain
- Pennant of Group Captain

- Rank insignia of a group captain of the Indian Air Force

- Epaulette rank insignia
- Country: India
- Service branch: Indian Air Force
- Abbreviation: Gp Capt; G/C
- Rank: Group captain
- Next higher rank: Air Commodore
- Next lower rank: Wing commander
- Equivalent ranks: Colonel (Indian Army); Captain (Indian Navy)

Group Captain is a rank in the Indian Air Force. Group Captain ranks above the rank of Wing commander and lower than an Air Commodore. It is equivalent to colonel in the Indian Army and captain in the Indian Navy.

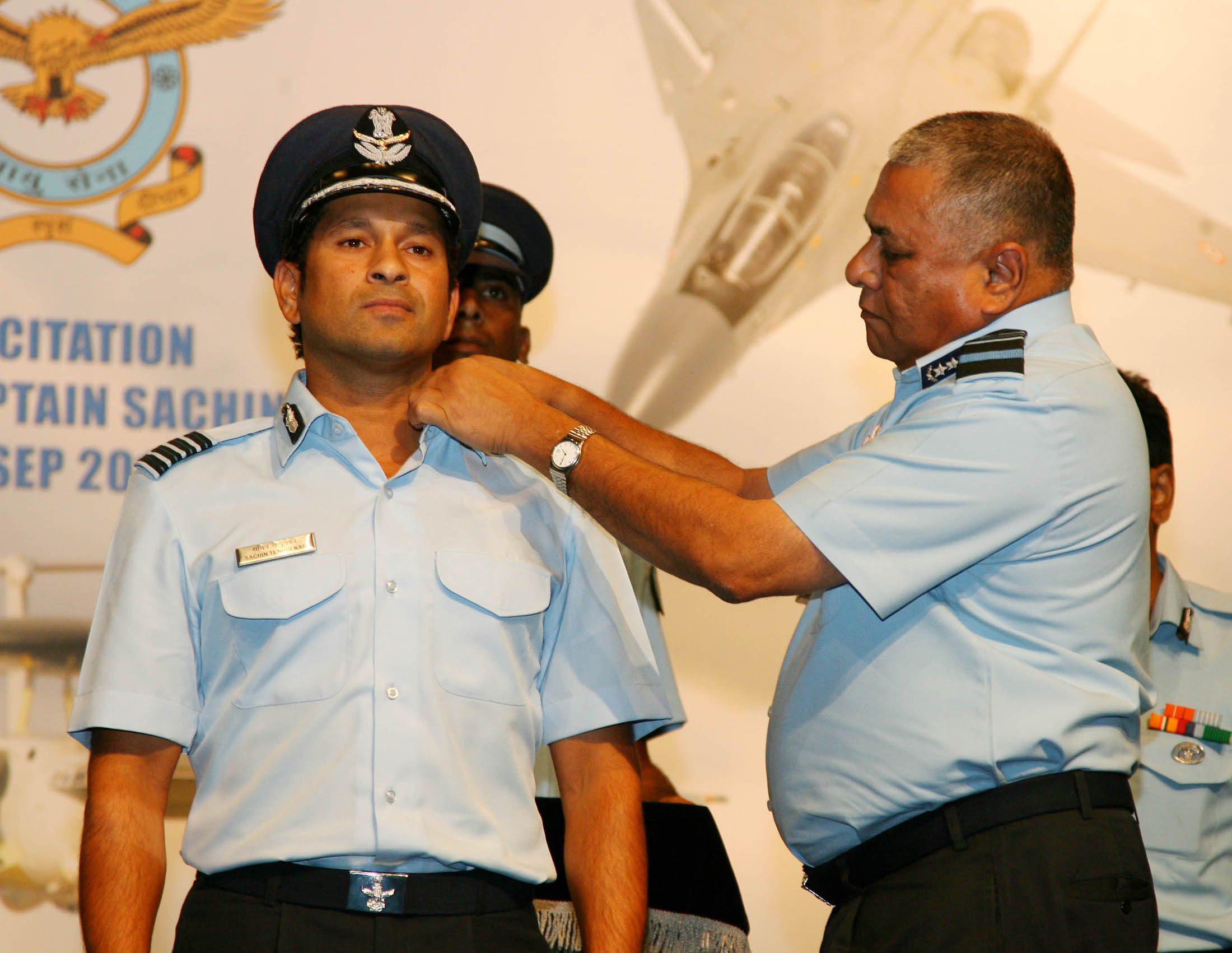
The Chief of the Air Staff Air Chief Marshal P. V. Naik conferring the honorary rank of Group Captain to cricketer Sachin Tendulkar.

== History ==
On 06 March 1946, Subroto Mukerjee was promoted to the acting rank of Group Captain, the first Indian officer to be promoted to the rank. He was appointed Group Captain (Plans & Training) at Air headquarters.

== Appointments ==
Group captains in the Indian Air Force command squadrons and helicopter units. Officers in the rank of Group Captain also serve as chief operations officers of air force stations. The air attachés and air advisors at India's high commissions and embassies in most countries are officers of the rank of group captain. At Air headquarters, group captains hold the appointments of directors of directorates and branches.

== Insignia ==
The pennant of a group captain is triangular in shape and is sky blue with the Indian Air Force roundel surmounted by the eagle from the Indian Air Force badge. The badges of rank consists of four sky blue bands, each on a slightly wider navy blue band. A group captain wears gorget patches which are blue patches with white braids. In addition to this, the blue grey terrywool tunic has four sleeve stripes consisting of narrow bands.

== Pay scale ==
Group Captains are at pay level 13, with a monthly pay between ₹130,600 (US$1,400) and ₹215,900 (US$2,300) with a military service pay of ₹15,500 (US$160). This is the first selection-grade rank. The promotion to the rank can happen through selection or on time-scale basis. A minimum of 15 years of commissioned service is required for an officer to be considered in the selection grade. This is the highest rank which may be attained by officers on time-scale promotion if not promoted to group captain by selection after 26 years of commissioned service.

== See also ==
- Air Force ranks and insignia of India
