= Gaganyaan =

Indian crewed orbital spacecraft

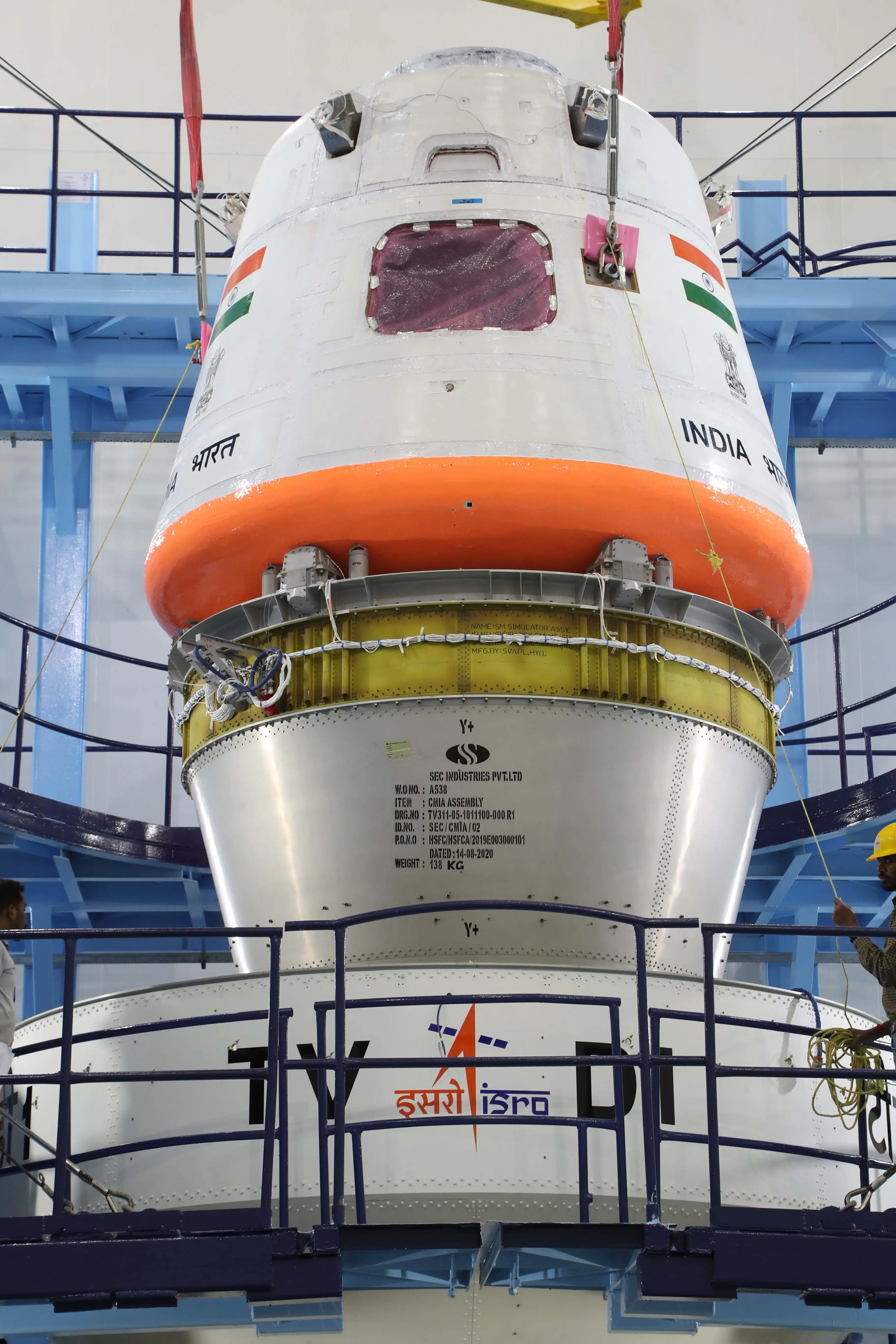
- Gaganyaan crew-module mounted on TV-D1 vehicle, in-preparations towards a sub-orbital test flight.
- Manufacturer: ISRO; DRDO; HAL
- Country of origin: India
- Operator: ISRO
- Applications: Crewed orbital vehicle
- Website: ISRO

Specifications
- Spacecraft type: Crewed
- Launch mass: 8,200 kg (18,100 lb) (includes service module)
- Dry mass: 3,735 kg (8,234 lb)
- Crew capacity: 3
- Dimensions: Diameter: 3.5 m (11 ft); Height: 3.58 m (11.7 ft)
- Volume: 8 m^{3} (280 cu ft)
- Power: Photovoltaic array
- Regime: Low Earth orbit
- Design life: 7 days

Production
- Status: In development
- Maiden launch: Uncrewed: TBD 2026 (Gaganyaan-1); Crewed: TBD 2028 (Gaganyaan-3)
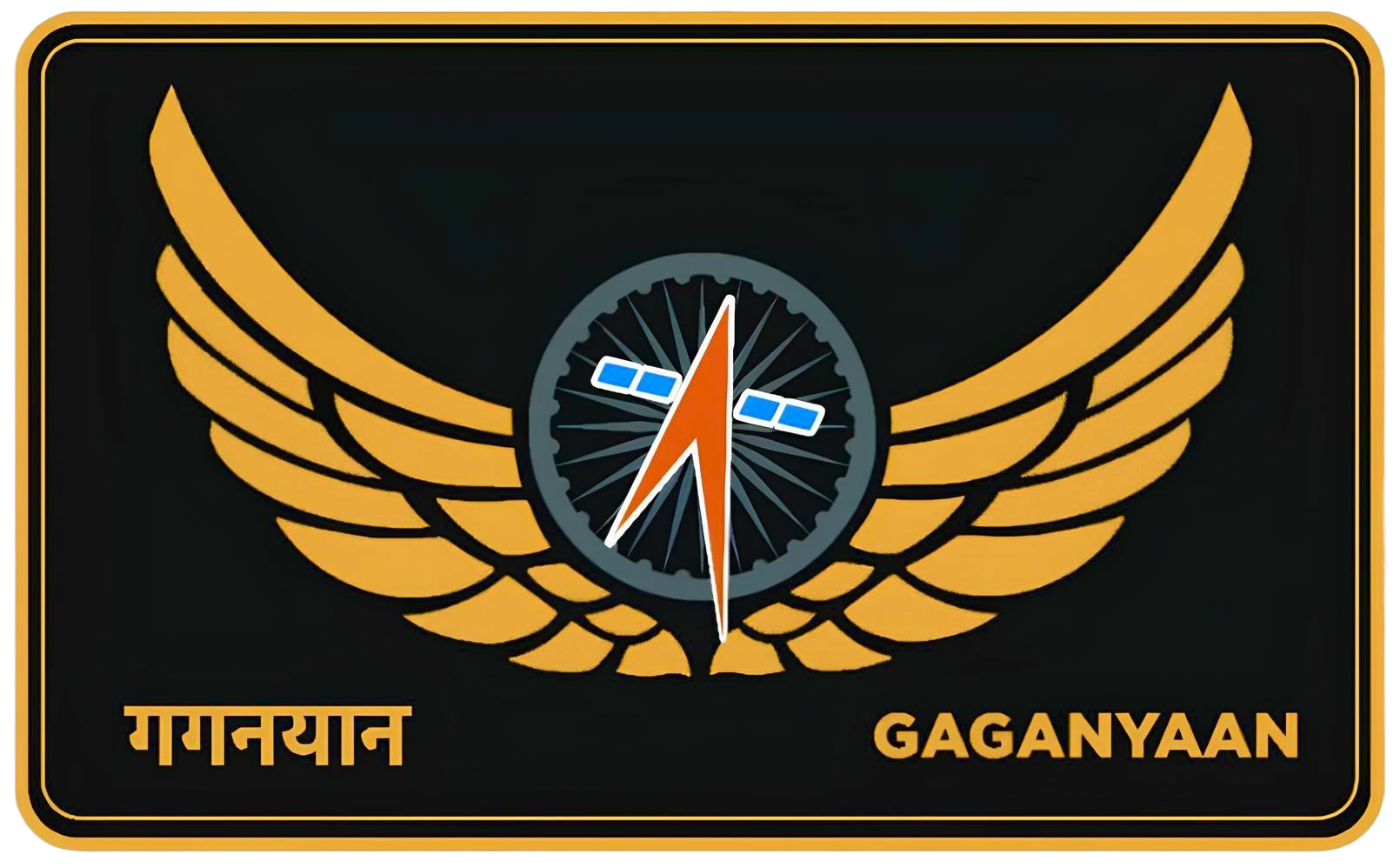
- Gaganyaan Mission Patch

Gaganyaan (Sanskrit: [ɡəɡənəjɑːnə],, from Sanskrit: gagana, "celestial" and yāna, "craft, vehicle") is an Indian crewed orbital spacecraft intended to be the formative spacecraft of the Indian Human Spaceflight Programme. The spacecraft is being designed to carry three people to low Earth orbit, and a planned upgraded version will be equipped with rendezvous and docking capabilities.

In its maiden crewed mission, ISRO's largely autonomous 5.3 tonnes (5.2 long tons; 5.8 short tons) capsule will orbit the Earth at 400 kilometres (250 mi) altitude for up to seven days with a two- or three-person crew on board. The first crewed mission was originally planned to be launched on ISRO's human-rated LVM3 rocket (HLVM3) in December 2021. As of November 2024, it is expected to be launched no earlier than 2027.

The Hindustan Aeronautics Limited (HAL)-manufactured crew module underwent its first uncrewed experimental flight in 2014; design of the crew module was completed in 2019. The Defence Research and Development Organisation (DRDO) provides life support systems including space food, crew healthcare, radiation measurement and protection, module parachutes, and the fire suppression system.

The Gaganyaan project is led by V. R. Lalithambika, the former Director of the Directorate of the Human Spaceflight Programme with ISRO Chairman V. Narayanan and A. Rajarajan, Director of Vikram Sarabhai Space Centre. Imtiaz Ali Khan superseded V. R. Lalithambika as the Director of the Directorate of Human Spaceflight Programme.

== Background ==
Like the Chandrayaan and other extraterrestrial missions, the Indian space programme began with no intentions of undertaking sophisticated initiatives like human spaceflight. It was only after ISRO developed extensive launch capabilities when human spaceflight was being considered in the late 2000s. In August 2007, the then Chairman of the ISRO, G. Madhavan Nair, revealed that the agency was "seriously considering" the creation of a human spaceflight programme. He further indicated that, ISRO would report on its development of new space capsule technologies within a year. Later in the 2010s, the development of LVM3 enabled ISRO to pursue the Indian Human Spaceflight Programme with Gaganyaan, the first crewed spacecraft of India.

=== Soviet-India Cooperation ===
Although the Indian Space Research Organisation (ISRO) did not pursue an independent human-spaceflight programme during the 20th century, it participated in a joint mission under Soviet Union's Interkosmos programme, where Indian Air Force pilot Rakesh Sharma was selected and trained for spaceflight in cooperation with the Soviet space program.

On 3 April 1984, Sharma became the first Indian-born citizen to enter space when he flew aboard the Soviet Soyuz T-11, launched from Baikonur Cosmodrome in the Kazakh Soviet Socialist Republic (now Kazakhstan). The Soyuz T-11 spacecraft carrying cosmonauts including Sharma docked and transferred the three member Soviet-Indian international crew, consisting of the ship's commander, Yury Malyshev, and flight engineer, Gennadi Strekalov, to the Salyut 7 Orbital Station. Sharma spent 7 days, 21 hours, and 40 minutes aboard the Salyut 7, during which he conducted an Earth observation focused on the Indian subcontinent. He also did life sciences and materials processing experiments, including silicium fusing tests.

The mission provided India with early operational and scientific exposure to human spaceflight, contributing foundational experience that would inform ISRO's later ambitions in crewed space missions. To commemorate the occasion, the governments of India and the Soviet Union released special stamps and first day covers.

== Spacecraft history ==
Preliminary studies and technological development of Gaganyaan capsule started in 2006 under the generic name "Orbital Vehicle". The plan was to design a simple capsule with an endurance of about a week in space, a capacity of two astronauts, and a splashdown landing after re-entry. The project was commissioned in 2007, with expected completion by 2024 and a budget of around ₹10,000 crore. The spacecraft design was finalized by March 2008 and was submitted to the Government of India for funding under ISRO's human spaceflight programme, which was sanctioned in February 2009, but fell short due to limited developmental funding. Initially, the first uncrewed flight of the orbital vehicle was proposed to be in 2013, then it was revised to 2016. However, in April 2012, it was reported that funding problems placed the future of the project in serious doubt. And in August 2013, it was announced that all crewed spaceflight efforts by India had been designated as being "off ISRO's priority list". By early 2014, the project had been reconsidered and was one of the main beneficiaries of a substantial budget increase announced in February 2014.

Space Capsule Recovery Experiment

ISRO developed the Gaganyaan orbital vehicle based on the tests performed with their scaled 555 kilograms (1,224 lb) experimental spacecraft from Space Capsule Recovery Experiment (SRE), which was launched and recovered in January 2007. In SRE, an experimental capsule that had been in orbit earlier splashed into the Bay of Bengal after descending from a height of 635 kilometres (395 mi). The purpose of the mission was to test reusable thermal protection system, management of communication blackout, guidance, navigation and control, hypersonic aero-thermodynamics, braking system, deceleration system, flotation devices and recovery procedures.

=== Cabinet approval ===
The push for the Indian Human Spaceflight Program, which included the Gaganyaan spacecraft, took place in 2017. It was accepted and formally announced by Prime Minister Narendra Modi during his 2018 Independence Day address to the nation. The programme was approved by the Union Cabinet on 28 December 2018. The design in 2022 called for a crew of three. ISRO was set to perform four biological and two physical science experiments related to microgravity during the first Gaganyaan mission. Hydrazine was planned to be replaced with green propellant on Gaganyaan missions, for which the Liquid Propulsion Systems Centre (LPSC) was already working on a monopropellant blended formulation consisting of hydroxylammonium nitrate (HAN), ammonium nitrate, methanol and water as of 2021.

Delays

Many of the fundamental technologies were realized by ISRO by the time IHSP was approved by the Union Cabinet. After receiving approval, many of them were human-rated to make sure their dependability satisfied the requirements needed for human spaceflight. Space Capsule Recovery Experiment II (SRE-2), an extension of the 2007 SRE mission, was canceled in 2018 as a result of excessive delays. In a reply to the Rajya Sabha on February 13, 2025, Minister of Science and Technology Jitendra Singh Rana stated the COVID-19 pandemic was the main reason of the delay, slowing down the production of avionics components and disrupting the supply chain. Unreliable raw material deliveries caused by supply chain failures, and a worldwide scarcity of space-grade components caused delays in the manufacturing and assembly of mission critical hardware. The project timeframe was extended for extra validation missions and crew safety tests to guarantee the highest standards of safety for astronauts. It necessitated further testing and improvements. To keep the orbital module's total mass within the HLVM3 launcher's lifting capabilities, the design had to be modified, which increased the complexity and engineering time. Delays in the necessary comprehensive study and testing were also caused by the indigenous development of the life support system.

=== Funding and project expansion ===
A crewed spacecraft was projected to require about ₹12,400 crore (US$1.77 billion) over a period of seven years, including the ₹5,000 crore (US$0.7 billion) for the initial work of the crewed spacecraft during the Eleventh Five-Year Plan (2007–2012) out of which the Government released ₹ 50 crore (US$7 million) in 2007–2008. In December 2018, the government approved a further ₹10,000 crore (US$1.5 billion) for a 7-day crewed flight of 3 astronauts to take place by 2021.

Expanding the scope of the Gaganyaan initiative, the Union Cabinet, led by Prime Minister Narendra Modi, approved on September 18, 2024, the development of the BAS-01 Base Module. The launch of the BAS-1 unit is one of the eight missions that are now part of the redesigned Indian Human-spaceflight Programme, which is scheduled for completion by December 2028. Hardware requirements and more unmanned flights are part of this expansion, which is meant to supplement the continuing human spaceflight programs. The Gaganyaan initiative has received an extra ₹11,170 crore (equivalent to ₹120 billion or US$1.3 billion in 2026) in financing to support its expanded scope, bringing the total budget to ₹20,193 crore (equivalent to ₹220 billion or US$2.3 billion in 2026). With four missions under the ongoing Human-spaceflight programme scheduled by 2026, the development of the BAS-1 module and four additional missions for technology demonstration and validation by 2028, the programme aims to develop and demonstrate critical technologies for long-duration human space missions.

=== Infrastructure and support ===
Madhavan Chandradathan, director of Satish Dhawan Space Centre (SDSC), stated that ISRO would need to set up an astronaut training facility in Bengaluru. In spring 2009, the full-scale mock-up of the crew capsule of Gaganyaan was built and delivered to Satish Dhawan Space Center for the training of astronauts. The newly established Human Space Flight Centre (HSFC) will coordinate the IHSF efforts. Existing launch facilities will be upgraded for launches under the Indian Human Spaceflight project. With extra facilities needed for launch escape systems. Russia is likely to provide astronaut training in the early phase, and first batch of astronauts had already returned from their exchange in Russian cosmonaut center in the 2020s.

India has already successfully developed and tested several building blocks, including re-entry space capsule, pad abort test, safe crew ejection mechanism in case of rocket failure, a flight suit developed by Defence Bioengineering and Electromedical Laboratory (DEBEL) and the powerful LVM3 launch vehicle. Having met all required technological keystones, the Indian Human Spaceflight Programme was accepted and formally announced by the Prime Minister Narendra Modi on 15 August 2018. Gaganyaan will be the first crewed spacecraft under this programme. To begin the training of doctors and engineers for space mission, Brigitte Godard, a flight surgeon affiliated with the European Space Agency, traveled to India in 2018. In 2021, ISRO established a temporary ground station for the Gaganyaan mission in the Cocos (Keeling) Islands, following an extended dialogue with the Australian Space Agency. ISRO has plans to build a permanent ground station for the project there. Tracking antennae will be supplied by ESA to keep an eye on the Gaganyaan spacecraft while it is in orbit.

In February 2024, IIT Kanpur built and evaluated the Hypervelocity Expansion Tunnel Test Facility, referred to as S2, in the Department of Aerospace Engineering's Hypersonic Experimental Aerodynamics Laboratory (HEAL). Extreme hypersonic conditions of atmospheric entry can be replicated at the S2 facility. It is anticipated that the facility will support Gaganyaan.

== Description ==
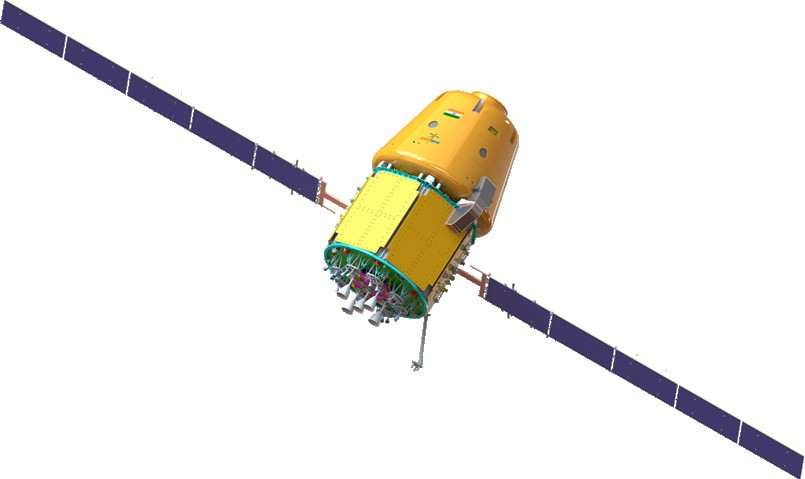
Gaganyaan spacecraft with deployed twin-solar array configuration.

=== Gaganyaan Crew Module ===
Gaganyaan crew module is a fully autonomous 5.3 t (12,000 lb) spacecraft designed to carry a 3-member crew to orbit and safely return to the Earth after a mission duration of up to seven days. The crew module is equipped with two parachutes for redundancy, with one parachute enough for a safe splashdown. The parachutes would reduce the speed of the crew module from over 216 m/s (480 mph) to under 11 m/s (25 mph) at splashdown. The space capsule will have life support and environmental control systems. It will be equipped with emergency mission abort capabilities and a Crew Escape System (CES) that can be activated during the first stage or second rocket stage burn. The nose of the original version of the orbital vehicle was free for a docking mechanism, but primary entry will be through a side hatch secured by explosive bolts.

Glavkosmos and Human Space Flight Centre signed a deal in October 2019 for Energia to equip the Gaganyaan crew with life support system and supply thermal control system for the spacecraft. In addition to supplying food, water, and oxygen and assisting in regulating body temperature, the life support system will also handle waste products of crew members. Throughout the mission, the thermal control system will maintain the spacecraft's component within permissible temperature limits. The Human Space Flight Center and Glavkosmos signed another deal on 11 March 2020, for the manufacture and supply of individual equipment packages. NPP Zvezda will manufacture customized couch liners and individual seats for Indian astronauts as part of the contract.

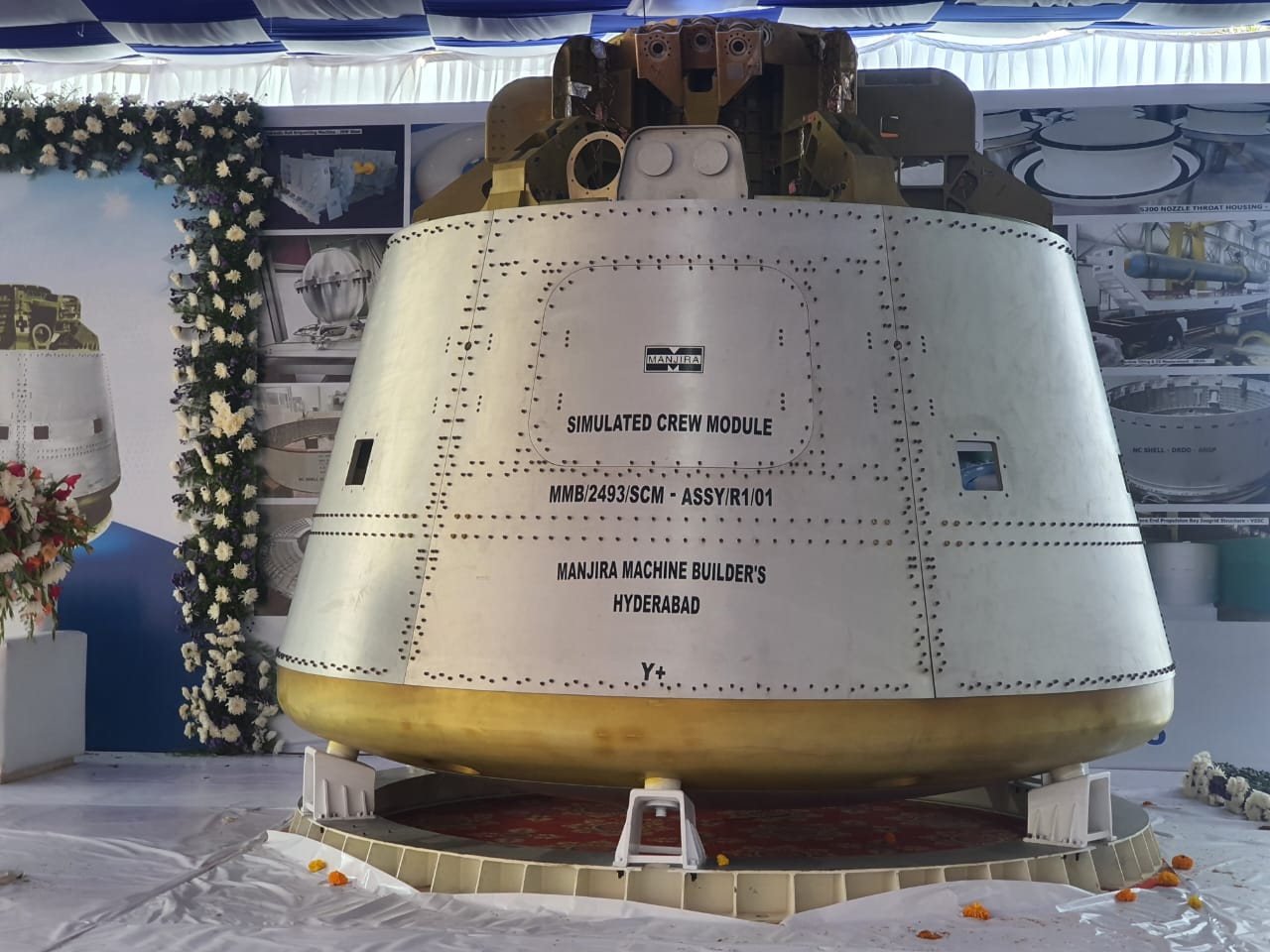
Simulated Crew Module (SCM) Structure Assembly

On 7 December 2022, The Hindu reported that the crew module had entered the production stage. ISRO has declared that it will be developing its own Environmental Control and Life Support System (ECLSS) for Gaganyaan mission. According to ISRO Chairman S. Somanath, ISRO has no experience in producing ECLSS, but following fruitless attempts to obtain it from other countries, it was forced to urge national laboratories and domestic industry to begin developing the technology because there were no foreign partners available to share the technology.

The first orbiter module adaptor assembly (OMA) for Gaganyaan was provided by Kineco Kaman Composites on 23 December 2023. The OMA is a conical structure with a diameter of 4 meters, composed of carbon-fiber-reinforced polymers. It is combined with the equipment bay shroud and crew escape module. An Apex cover on the top of the Crew Module protects the parachutes and associated subsystems during launch, flight and re-entry. Prior to parachute deployment,the apex cover is separated at a predetermined altitude by pyrotechnically actuated thrusters.

In order to visit the International Space Station (ISS) and Bharatiya Antariksh Station in the future, ISRO intends to incorporate International Docking System Standard (IDSS) compatibility. A Docking Adaptor called Bhartiya Docking System is currently under development.

SAKHI

An all-purpose software called SAKHI (Space-borne Assistant and Knowledge Hub for Crew Interaction) created by Vikram Sarabhai Space Centre will assist astronauts on the Gaganyaan space travel mission with a variety of duties, including interacting with one another and locating critical technical information. Among its many duties, SAKHI will closely monitor their health, sending data on vital signs including blood pressure, heart rate, and oxygen saturation. This information will be extremely helpful in determining the crew's physical state during the Gaganyaan mission. Ensuring a smooth communication link, SAKHI will maintain the crew's connection to the ground-based stations and the onboard computer. The app will also serve as a reminder for them regarding their sleep patterns, food regimen, and hydration levels. An engineering model of the specially designed, portable smart device with SAKHI has been successfully tested by the space facility. The process is ongoing for creating a flight approved, production ready model. Fastened to their space suits, the digital platform is always readily available. Additionally, the astronauts can report their journey using the app in a variety of formats, such as voice notes, texts, and photos.

=== Service module ===
The Gaganyaan Spacecraft will have a 2.9 t (6,400 lb) service module is powered by liquid propellant engines. The crew module is mated to the service module, and together they constitute 8.2 t (18,000 lb) orbital module. It will power the spacecraft and run its main engines during orbit circularization, on-orbit control, de-boost manoeuvring and Service Module based abort during the ascent phase. The Liquid Apogee Motor (LAM) engines provide the main propulsive force during the orbit circularisation & de-boost phases, while the Reaction Control System (RCS) thrusters ensures precise attitude control. The Gaganyaan Service module will also pyrotechnic bolts to disconnect itself from the C-32 stage and from the crew module. In an emergency scenario, It can fire its RCS engines to pull itself away from the launch vehicle.

The SM is linked to the CM via the Crew Module Service Module - Connect Disconnect System (CS-CDS). All electrical connections between CM and SM as well as the hydraulics connections for the ECLSS takes place through CS-CDS. This system consists of two umbilicals, CSU-1 & CSU-2, one each at CM and SM side. After separation of SM from CM at CSU-1, CSU-2 on CM side is separated before re-entry of CM.

The Service Module Propulsion System (SMPS) will perform an orbit raising manoeuvre allowing Gaganyaan to reach 400 kilometres (250 mi) in low Earth orbit (LEO), then remain docked during a deorbit burn until atmospheric reentry. It will use an unified bipropellant system consisting of MON-3 and Monomethylhydrazine as oxidizer and fuel, having five main engines derived from ISRO's liquid apogee motor with 440 N (99 lb_{f}) thrust and sixteen 100 N reaction control system (RCS) thrusters. As of July 2025, ISRO has completed all development programmes and qualification tests related to the SMPS system.

=== Escape system ===
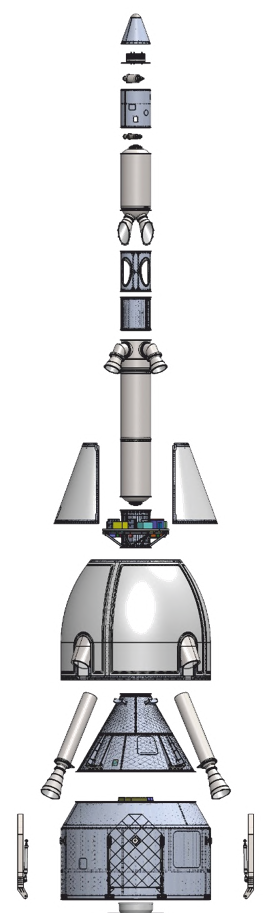
Launch escape system

The Gaganyaan Crew Escape System (CES) consists of five quick-acting solid motors in a Tractor configuration.They are High-Altitude Pitch Motor (HPM), Low Altitude Pitch Motor (LPM), CES Jettisoning Motor (CJM), High Altitude Escape Motors (HEM) and Low Altitude Escape Motor (LEM). They will be used to pull the crew module away from the rocket in case of an emergency at the launch tower or during the initial stages of flight.

ISRO successfully conducted a pad abort test on 5 July 2018, at Satish Dhawan Space Centre. This was the first of a series of tests to qualify the launch escape system technology. In 2023, a high altitude abort test occurred with a L40 booster (derived from the GSLV) as the rocket, aborting at Mach 1.2. A future repeat of the high altitude abort test will aim to reach Mach 1.4 before aborting.

=== Recovery and rescue ===
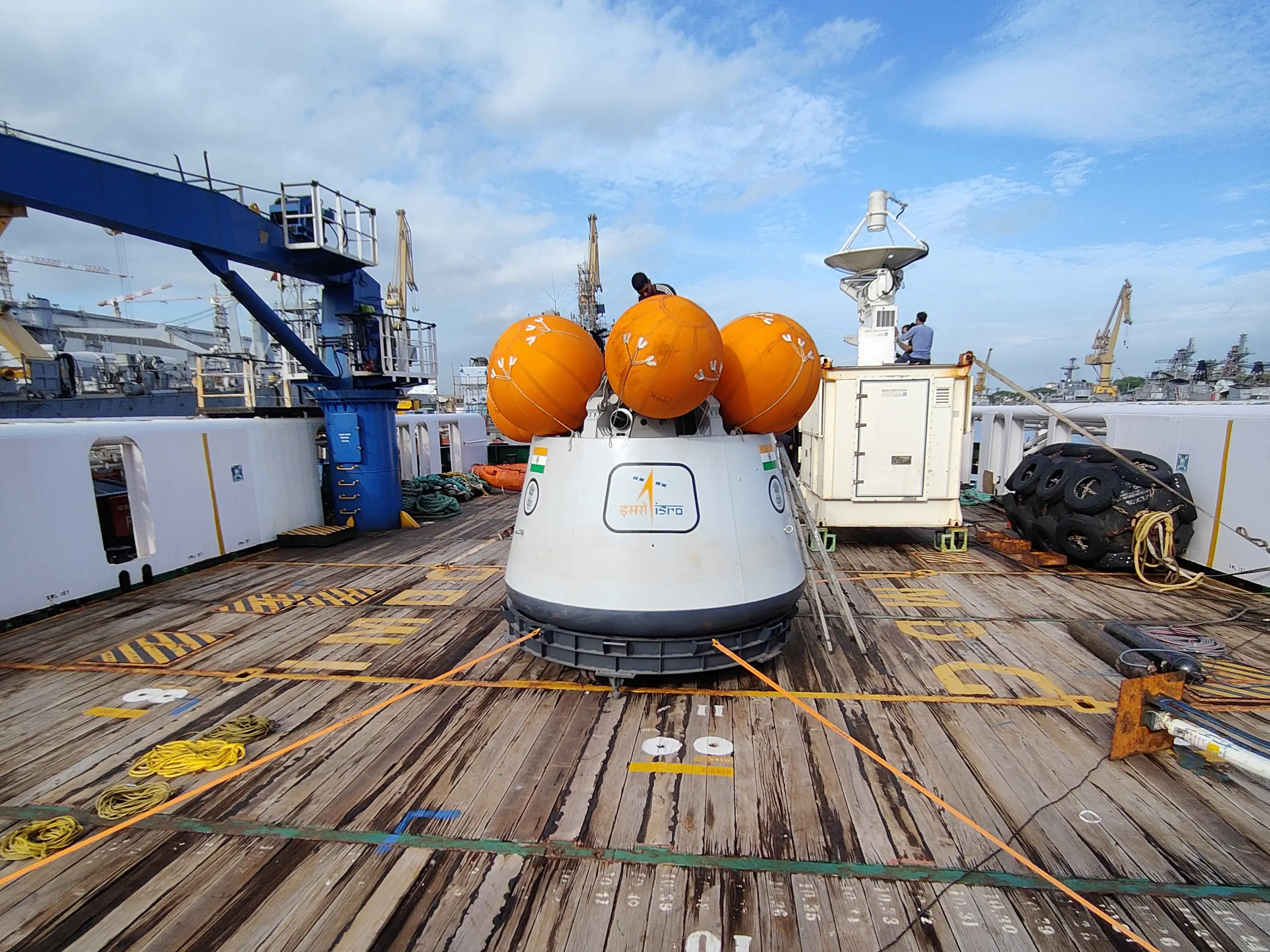
Recovery trial operations with Crew Module Mockup (CMRM)

The Gaganyaan module is intended to land in the Arabian Sea, where Indian agencies are expected to be stationed in order to rescue both the crew and the module. Nonetheless, the space agency has selected 48 backup locations in international waters in case the primary plan is altered. Two landing sites in Indian waters, one in the Arabian Sea and the other in the Bay of Bengal, were initially chosen by ISRO. But the landing spot in the Arabian Sea was decided upon taking into account the choppy seas and unpredictability of the Bay of Bengal. A stored cold gas based up-righting system has been developed by ISRO to keep the capsule upright in the water for easier recovery.

The Water Survival Training Facility of the Indian Navy in Kochi served as the site for the first phase of the Gaganyaan recovery trial operations. Tata Elxsi and ISRO are working together on the second phase of crew recuperation training. The company has built recovery models for the crew module that replicate the mass, center of gravity, exterior dimensions, interfaces, and externals of the real crew module. In Kochi and Visakhapatnam, two recovery models have been delivered to the Indian Navy's training personnel.

On November 20, 2024, ISRO and the Australian Space Agency (ASA) signed an Implementing Arrangement outlining their collaboration on crew and crew module recovery for the Gaganyaan. International partners will receive standard operating procedures (SOPs) from ISRO regarding the prevention of propellant contamination, the prevention of explosions, how to access crew in the event that doors cannot be opened, and other related matters. Jarrod Powell, General Manager, Space Capability Branch, representing ASA in Canberra, and D.K. Singh, Director, Human Space Flight Centre, representing ISRO in Bengaluru, signed the Implementing Arrangement. Based on its experience in Antarctic operations and remote medicine, Australia is expected to share its knowledge of applied space medicine and life sciences. As part of a backup plan for the ascent phase that ends close to Australian waters, Australia will collaborate with India to guarantee assistance for crew search and rescue as well as crew module recovery.

Using a mass and shape simulated crew module mock-up, ISRO and the Indian Navy's Eastern Naval Command successfully completed the well deck trials on 6 December 2024. A ship's well deck was filled with water so that recovered spacecraft, boats, and landing vehicles could be brought inside for docking. The entire sequence of operations, which included attaching the recovery buoy, towing, entering the well deck, placing the crew module on ground fittings, and draining the well deck, was validated. In order to improve the SOPs for recovery operations under both nominal and off-nominal conditions, a number of recovery trials are being conducted.

=== Docking and berthing of spacecraft ===
ISRO tested space docking capabilities during SpaDeX mission in early 2025. The technology will also be employed on the Chandrayaan-4 and future missions to Gaganyaan and Bharatiya Antariksh Station. A project report that includes all the information, a study and internal evaluation, and a cost estimate has been prepared and is about to be approved by the government.

== Development and testing ==
=== Ground Development tests ===
By early 2026, over 8000 ground tests and all structural qualification, engineering and all vehicle propulsion tests were completed with flight software simulations and environmental tests being reported to be in progress at ISRO facilities for the Gaganyaan mission. Some notable and crucial tests conducted by ISRO in this timeframe include:

==== Static test for Launch Escape Motors ====
On 11 August 2022, ISRO successfully completed the test firing of Low Altitude Escape Motor (LEM) for Crew Escape System. LEM consists of a solid rocket motor with four reverse flow nozzles that generates maximum sea level thrust of 842 kN (nominal) with burn time of 5.98 second (nominal). The nozzle end of LEM is mounted at the fore end of the launch vehicle to avoid exhaust plume impingement on crew module. This is why there are reverse flow multiple nozzle in the solid rocket motor. The reverse flow nozzle makes exhaust gas flow in opposite direction in the nozzle region. Further testing was conducted in 2025 and 2026 for the High Altitude Escape Motoe (HEM), along with Vacuum ignition tests for both.

The objective of this test was to check ballistic parameters, validate motor subsystem performance (and confirm the design margins), evaluate the thermal performance of nozzle liners especially to confirm the ablative characteristics, validate integrity of all interfaces, evaluate the head-end mounted safe arm (HMSA) based ignition system performance, and evaluate side thrust due to misalignment and variation in flow and other functional parameters including flow reversal.

==== Service Module Propulsion System demonstration ====
A system demonstration model (SDM) of the Service Module Propulsion System (SMPS), which will be incorporated into the Gaganyaan spacecraft, was successfully tested by ISRO on 28 August 2021. The service module is designed and developed by Liquid Propulsion Systems Centre (LPSC).

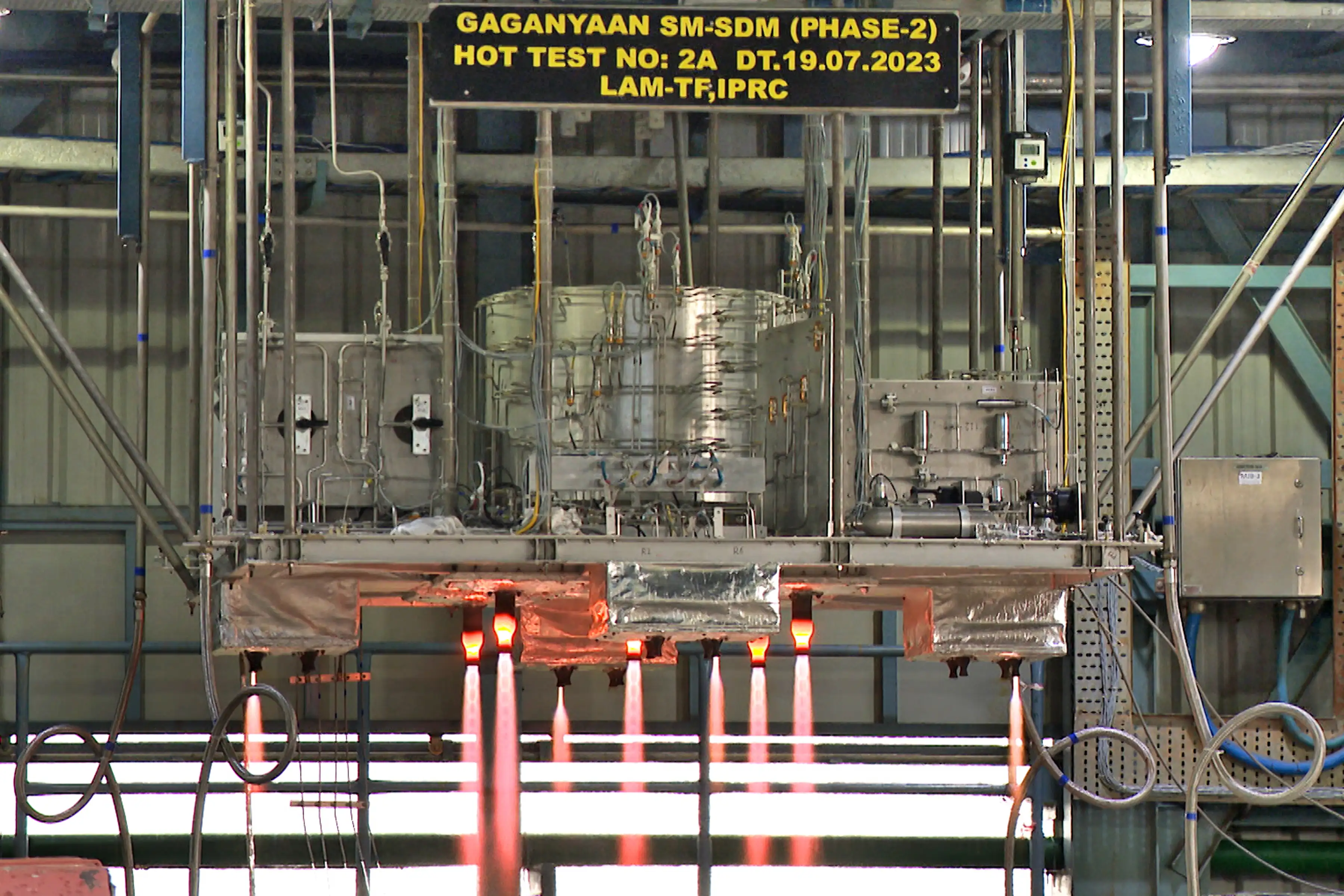
Service module – system demo model hot test conducted on 19 July 2023 at ISRO Propulsion Complex successfully established the faultless operation of all components and systems.

At the ISRO Propulsion Complex (IPRC), the system demonstration model was fired for 450 seconds. The performance met the pre-test prediction model. The propulsion system for the service module is a single bi-propellant system consists of sixteen 100 Newton thrusters for reaction control system (RCS) and five primary 440 Newton thrust engines, using monomethylhydrazine (MMH) and mixed oxides of nitrogen (MON-3) as the fuel and oxidizer, respectively. Additionally, IPRC is constructing a new facility to test the Service Module Propulsion System. To validate the propulsion system on the ground, the test model for the system demonstration employed only eight 100 Newton thrusters and five 440 Newton engines.

On 19 July 2023, ISRO successfully completed the test of Gaganyaan Service Module Propulsion System. Five hot tests totaling 2,750 seconds were conducted by ISRO as part of the Phase-1 test series. Eight 100 Newton RCS thrusters and five 440 Newton liquid apogee motor (LAM) engines were used in Phase 1. The system's hot testing replicated the operation of the flight-qualified thruster, helium pressurization system, propellant tank feed system, and control components. During the test, which lasted 250 seconds, RCS thrusters and LAM engines were used continuously. During the Gaganyaan mission's ascending phase, the RCS thrusters will ensure precise attitude correction, while the LAM engines will supply the primary propulsive force.

The SMPS carries out orbit injection, circularization burn, on-orbit control, de-boost maneuvering, and service module based abort if necessary during the ascent phase for the Orbital Module. On 20 July 2023, hot test was conducted in final configuration of SMPS in which sixteen RCS thrusters with 100 Newton thrust and five LAM engines with 440 Newton thrust were used. The propellant tank feed system, helium pressurization system, flight-qualified thrusters, and control components were all included in the hot test which simulated the fluid circuit of the SMPS. The combined performance of SMPS was showcased in the first hot test of the Phase-2 test series. Each 440 Newton thrust engine will also be tested individually for longer duration involving various parameters to gain human-rating certification. ISRO has scheduled five additional tests to demonstrate both nominal and off-nominal mission scenarios.

On 26 July 2023, ISRO conducted two more hot tests on the SMPS with success. The thrusters were run in tandem with the mission profile, both in continuous and pulsed mode. The first hot test, which lasted 723.60 seconds, was intended to show how to pump fuel into the orbital module and burn 100 Newton thrusters and LAM engines for calibration. The calibration burn was essential to identify and isolate any non-operational engines. The RCS thrusters and LAM engines operated as anticipated. The goal of the second hot test, which lasted 350 seconds, was to show how the Orbital Module circularizes to reach the final orbit. The RCS thrusters functioned in pulse mode throughout this test, while the LAM engines ran continuously.

To verify Service Module Propulsion System, two brief hot tests lasting 30 and 100 seconds were carried out at IPRC-Mahendragiri on 3 July 2025. The overall performance throughout these hot tests was normal. All LAM engines and all RCS thrusters was able operate simultaneously in both steady state and pulsed modes during 100 seconds test.

==== Integrated Main Parachute Airdrop Test ====
Integrated Main Parachute Airdrop Test for Parachute Deceleration System.

On 18 November 2022, Vikram Sarabhai Space Centre (VSSC) conducted an Integrated Main Parachute Airdrop Test (IMAT) of the Parachute Deceleration System (PDS), in which 5 tonnes (4.9 long tons; 5.5 short tons) dummy mass equivalent of the actual crew module mass was taken to an altitude of 2.5 kilometres (1.6 mi) and dropped from Ilyushin Il-76 by Indian Air Force. Two small pyro-based mortar-deployed pilot parachutes then pulled the main parachutes free. The size of the main parachutes was initially restricted to a smaller area to reduce opening shock. After 7 seconds, the pyro-based reefing line cutters cut the area restricting line, allowing the parachutes to inflate fully. The fully inflated main parachutes reduced the payload speed to a safe landing speed. The entire sequence lasted about 2–3 minutes.

The Parachute Deceleration System is jointly developed by ISRO and DRDO. System design, analytical simulations for parachute deployment, development of ordnance devices for parachute ejection, mechanical assembly, instrumentation and avionics were done by VSSC. In total, five air dropped tests (of 10 parachutes) are planned as part of qualification process.

On 3 November 2025, ISRO successfully evaluated the primary parachutes for the Gaganyaan crew module at the Babina Field Firing Range. The crew module-equivalent simulated mass was dropped from a height of 2.5 km (1.6 mi). The test object performed a stable descent and soft landing, confirming the parachute's resilience, and is deployed as intended. This test validated the main parachutes for the maximum design by successfully demonstrating one of the potential scenarios of delay in the disreefing between the two main parachutes. The test assessed the load distribution and structural stability of the system under asymmetric disreefing circumstances. Redundancy is built into the system's design. ISRO conducted further testing in July 2026 to qualify the Main Parachute for the G1 flight.

Integrated Main Parachute Airdrop tests (IMAT)
Test	Date	Altitude	Carrier aircraft	Dummy mass	Location	Outcome	Notes
IMAT-01	18 November 2022	2.5 km (1.6 mi)	Indian Air Force IL-76	5,000 kg (11,000 lb)	Babina Field Fire Range, Jhansi	Success	First IMAT test. Disreefing of the main parachutes was tested.
IMAT-03	3 November 2025	2.5 km (1.6 mi)	Indian Air Force IL-76	6,000 kg (13,000 lb)	Babina Field Fire Range, Jhansi	Success	Possible extreme scenario of delay in the disreefing between the two main parachutes was tested.
IMAT-05	7 July 2026	2.5 km (1.6 mi)	Indian Air Force IL-76	6,000 kg (13,000 lb)	ADRDE drop zone, Sheopur	Success	G1 flight qualification test to evaluate the main parachute's design margins and structural integrity under the highest anticipated load scenarios.

==== Drogue Parachute Deployment Tests ====
Drouge Parachute Rocket sled tests in December 2025

A variety of real-world conditions were recreated during the three comprehensive tests in order to thoroughly assess the functionality and dependability of the drogue parachutes. The first test, which replicated the maximum reefed weight, introduced reefing in a mortar-deployed parachute for the first time in India. The second test replicated the maximum disreefed load, while the third test demonstrated the drogue parachute's deployment in a scenario that mirrored the Crew Module's maximum angle of attack it might experience during its mission. All these tests served as a critical qualification milestone for the drogue parachutes, confirming their readiness for integration into Test Vehicle Abort Mission-1 and further test flights.

Prior to the tests, teams at the Rail Track Rocket Sled Facility had already completed the test of pilot and apex cover separation parachutes. Ten parachutes will be used in the complex parachute sequence for the deceleration system of the Gaganyaan crew module. The two apex cover separation parachutes are deployed first in the process, and two drogue parachutes are deployed when stability is accomplished. The mission enters the extraction phase once the drogue parachutes are released. Three pilot parachutes separately remove the three main parachutes, which is a crucial step in lowering the Crew Module's speed to acceptable levels for a safe landing. This allowed the crew module with the parachute system to pass a series of tests for shock-survivability and vibration later that year.

===== DPDT-1 =====
On 8 August 2023, ISRO informed the media that Vikram Sarabhai Space Centre in collaboration with Aerial Delivery Research and Development Establishment successfully conducted a series of Drogue parachute Deployment Tests at Rail Track Rocket Sled Facility of Terminal Ballistics Research Laboratory, from 8 to 10 August 2023. Pyrotechnic mortars were developed to launch parachutes into the air upon command. With a diameter of 5.8 meters, the conical ribbon-type parachutes use a single-stage reefing system that reduces canopy area and lessens opening stress to provide a controlled and smooth descent.

===== DPDT-2 =====
ISRO conducted another series of tests on 18 and 19 December 2025 at the Rail Track Rocket Sled Test Facility in TBRL, Chandigarh to validate modifications in the Disreefing systems. Launched from rocket powered sledge at over 600 kmph, both tests have flight qualified parachutes for the Gaganyaan-G1 flight.

===== DPDT-3 =====
ISRO and DRDO conducted the final qualification level load test for the Gaganyaan programme on 19 February 2026 at TBRL, Chandigarh. This trial was used to evaluate high-speed aerodynamic loads and evaluated changes in the ballistic trajectory of the capsule. Teams from VSSC and ARDE also verified the events. The test demonstrated the extra design safety margin of the parachute by simulating qualification level loads greater than the maximum flying loads.

==== Radio Frequency Compatibility Test ====
On 4 December 2024, ISRO and ESA signed a technical implementing plan to provide ground station support for Gaganyaan missions, which establishes uninterrupted data flow and communication with the mission's Orbital Module for monitoring and orbital operations. The radio equipment for the Gaganyaan spacecraft is scheduled to arrive at the European Space Operations Centre in December for compatibility testing. To make sure the spacecraft's radio transmitter and receiver can successfully communicate with the European Space Agency's antenna in Kourou, French Guiana, the test will be carried out at the Ground Segment Reference Facility. To assist ISRO in tracking and controlling the Gaganyaan crew module, ESOC will coordinate a number of radio antennas in the European Space Tracking network.

To confirm the network operation of the Gaganyaan orbital module communication system with the ESA ground stations, ISRO and the ESOC jointly finished a series of radio frequency compatibility tests on 12 February 2025. The successful test ensured that the entire communications architecture was ready and that the systems were compatible with ESTRACK. As part of the testing, the Gaganyaan's onboard telemetry, tracking and command, data management, and audio/video systems were integrated with ESTRACK.

==== Integrated Air Drop Test ====
Integrated Air Drop Tests (IADT) are aimed to demonstrate the end-to-end parachute based deceleration system for Gaganyaan missions with sea-based recovery. It consisted of four types of parachutes viz. Apex Cover Separation (ACS) (Ø 2.5 m - 2 nos), Drogue (Ø5.8 m - 2nos), Pilot (Ø3.4 m - 3 nos.) and Main parachutes (Ø 25 m - 3nos.). These tests would be conducted with joint efforts of ISRO, Indian Air Force, DRDO, Indian Navy and Indian Coast Guard. The IADT is a specialised trial to ensure the parachute system designed for the Gaganyaan crew module performs reliably in real-world conditions. A total of eight IADT tests are planned.

On 24 August 2025, ISRO announced the first successful Integrated Air Drop Test (IADT-01). During the test, a dummy crew capsule weighing around 4.8 tonnes (4.7 long tons; 5.3 short tons) was lifted up through the air before being dropped at an altitude of about 3 kilometres (1.9 mi) by an IAF Chinook helicopter. As it descended through a few kilometres, its main parachutes opened in a specific sequence to decelerate the capsule to a safe splashdown speed. Post splashdown, the simulated Crew Module was successfully recovered and ferried back on INS Anvesh to Chennai Port. Similar tests at different deployment conditions are planned by ISRO for February 2026.

ISRO conducted the second Integrated Air drop test on 10 April 2026. Union minister for Science Jitendra Singh announced its successful completion. The Test was conducted from Satish Dhawan space centre from an IAF Chinook. The boilerplate module was dropped from the helicopter to evaluate the performance of parachute deployment systems, descent control, and splashdown recovery procedures. A slightly heavier version of the prototype crew capsule, mimicking the exacts structure and weight of the capsule to be used in Gaganyaan-01 was used.Ten parachutes of four differing types were deployed i during the descent of the Crew Module Subsequently, the simulated Crew Module was successfully recovered by the Indian Navy. The IADT-02 test validated the final parachute-based deceleration systems in the Crew Module.

Integrated Air Drop Tests (IADT)
Test	Date	Altitude	Carrier aircraft	Capsule mass	Outcome	Notes
IADT-01	24 August 2025	3 km (1.9 mi)	Indian Air Force Chinook	4,800 kg (10,600 lb)	Success	First end-to-end parachute test. Crew Module was successfully recovered and ferried back on INS Anvesh to Chennai Port.
IADT-02	10 April 2026	3 km (1.9 mi)	Indian Air Force Chinook	5,700 kg (12,600 lb)	Success	Test objectives successfully accomplished.
Potentially up to six more tests planned

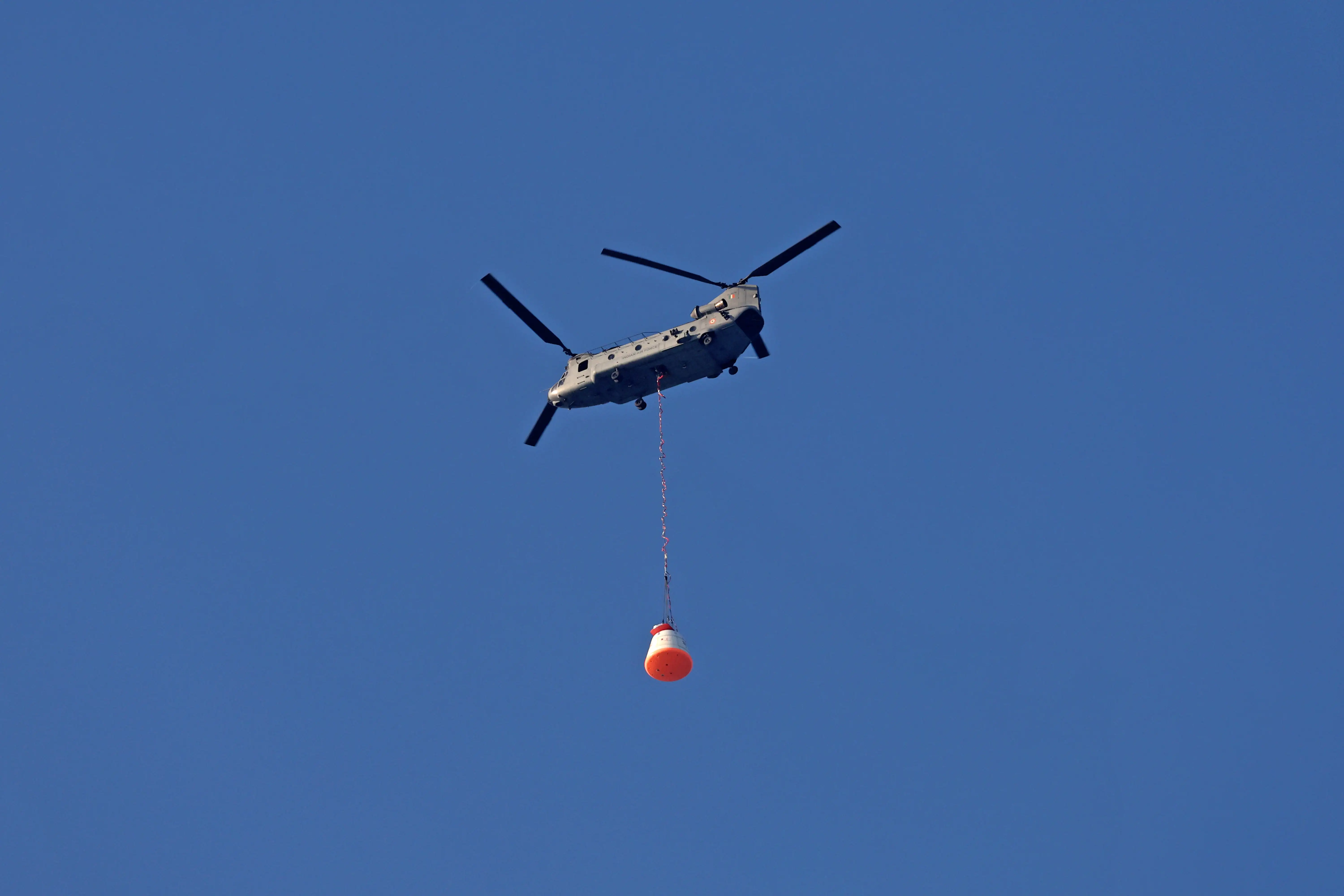
IAF Chinook Airdropping a Gaganyaan Boilerplate into the Bay of Bengal

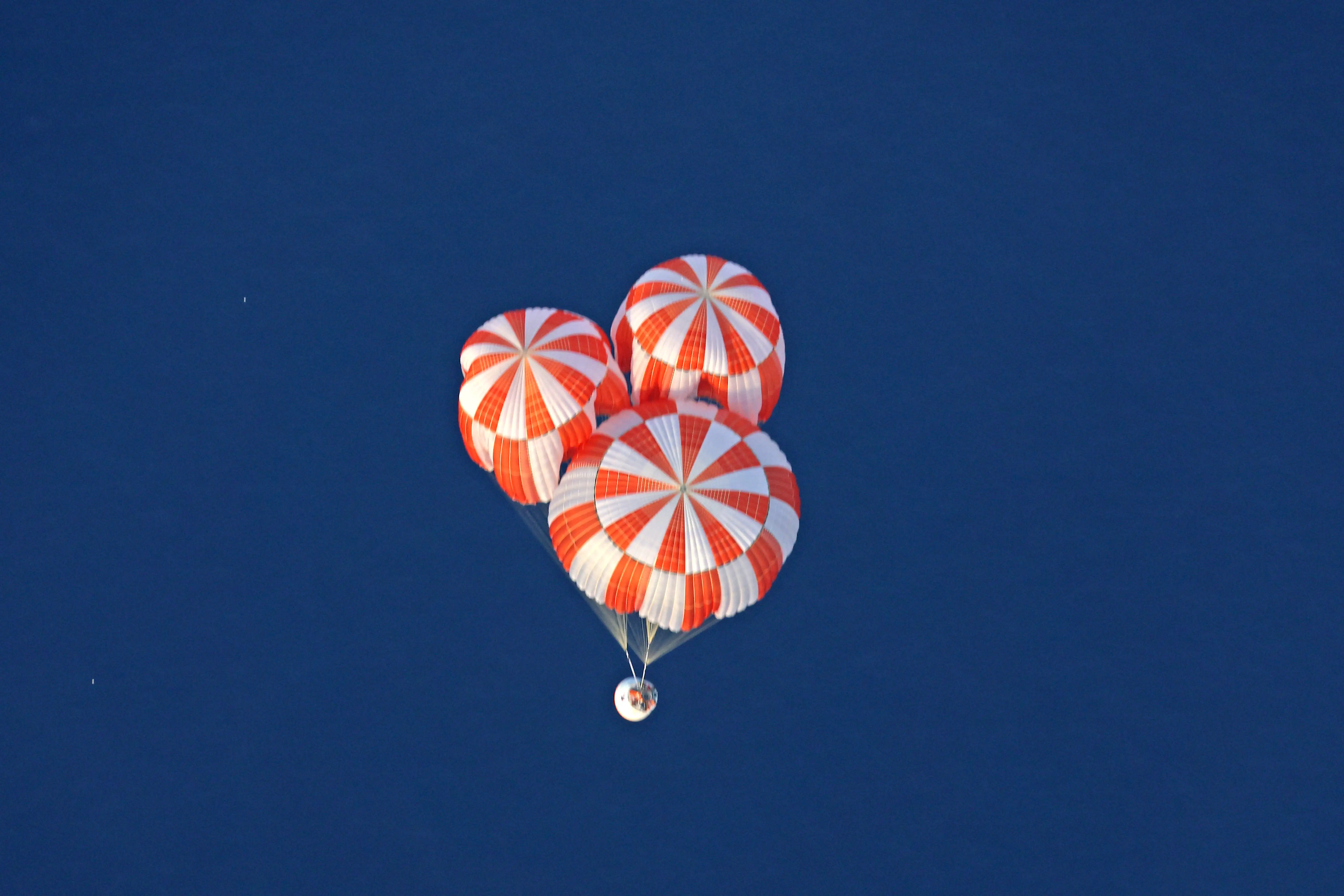
Main parachutes deployed during IADT-02

Airdrop video of IADT-02 from helicopter

==== Seaborne recovery trails ====
The Gaganyaan capsule is designed to splash down over water whereupon it will be recovered by Indian Navy ships. Well deck tests for such an operation was conducted aboard INS Jalashwa in December 2024. The Standard Operating Procedure involved attachment of a recovery buoy, well deck ingress,loading of crew module onto a recovery fixture,draining the well deck followd by crew egress.The tests involved recovering a simulated crew of vyomanauts aboard a boilerplate mockup of the crew module within minimum possible time and at minimum inconveiniance to the flight crew. The Crew recovery teams, drawn from the Divers arm and MARCOS commandos are trained at the Water Survival Training Facility at Kochi and at HSFC in Bengaluru. The final Crew Egress trails were conducted at INS Garuda on 20 February 2026.

An Emergency Sea Water Purification Kit was developed by Defence Research and Development Organisation. The package provides astronauts with clean water during operations and emergencies by eliminating excessive levels of Total Dissolved Matter, turbidity, color, and microbiological contamination from sea water in 30 minutes. The user testing for the Gaganyaan mission at Bombay Dockyard was successfully completed in 2022.

In case of a late launch abort, the spacecraft would attempt a splashdown near the Cocos Islands, whereupon it will be received by teams from the Australian Space Agency and the Royal Australian Navy.

==== Crew Module-Service Module separation tests ====
The Crew Module Service Module-Connect Disconnect System (CS-CDS) controls electrical and fluid communication for ECLSS and acts as an electrical and hydro-pneumatic umbilical link. Crew module and service module umbilical (CSU-1 and CSU-2), each at the crew module and service module side, make up the CS-CDS. The CSU-2 crew module side is detached prior to re-entry following the separation of the service module from the crew module at CSU-1.

The CSU-2 separation test from the simulated crew module was conducted in July 2026, proving the CSU-2's clean separation as well as the structural stability of the crew module panel and its interfaces. The test verified the integrated CSU-2 system's functionality and illustrated the necessary design margins.

For Gaganyaan-1, ISRO successfully completed additional separation tests of the crew and service modules at VSSC in October 2026. To confirm the general design suitability of the separation system, a test setup was created. The tests simulated the scenario in which crew and service modules are separated by severing umbilical connections. The tests demonstrated the robustness and shock-survivability of several critical subsystems, such as avionics, INS, thermal protection in the rear and conical side of the heat shield, crew module deployable umbilical shield, pyrotechnic devices of the crew module uprighting system, and thermal and humidity control.

==== Apex cover separation qualification ====
During the mission, the crew module's apex cover shields the parachutes and related subsystems. The apex cover is split at a predefined altitude using pyrotechnically operated thrusters prior to deployment parachutes in order to slow down the crew module. By July 2026, an instrumented test rig, a simulated crew module, and related systems were realized in order to verify the structural integrity of the crew module. At designated areas, the simulated crew module was subjected to approximately 1.75 times the estimated reaction loads. All of the strain and deformations that were measured throughout the testing verified the crew module's structural integrity as well as the design margins.

==== Crew Module Up-righting System qualification ====
Ensuring upright position of crew module after splashdown, a stored cold gas based Crew Module Up-righting System (CMUS) has been developed as of July 2026. A test setup consisting of all the elements of CMUS was realised and successfully conducted inflation tests for the primary inflation module where in stored gas in the high pressure gas container was made to inflate the floatation by operating the control valves. The tests demonstrated the inflation module meeting the functional and performance requirements for deployment of the primary flotation device. The test also demonstrated the inflation time requirements over the complete operating range of gas container.

=== Flight tests ===
==== Crew Module Atmospheric Re-entry Experiment ====
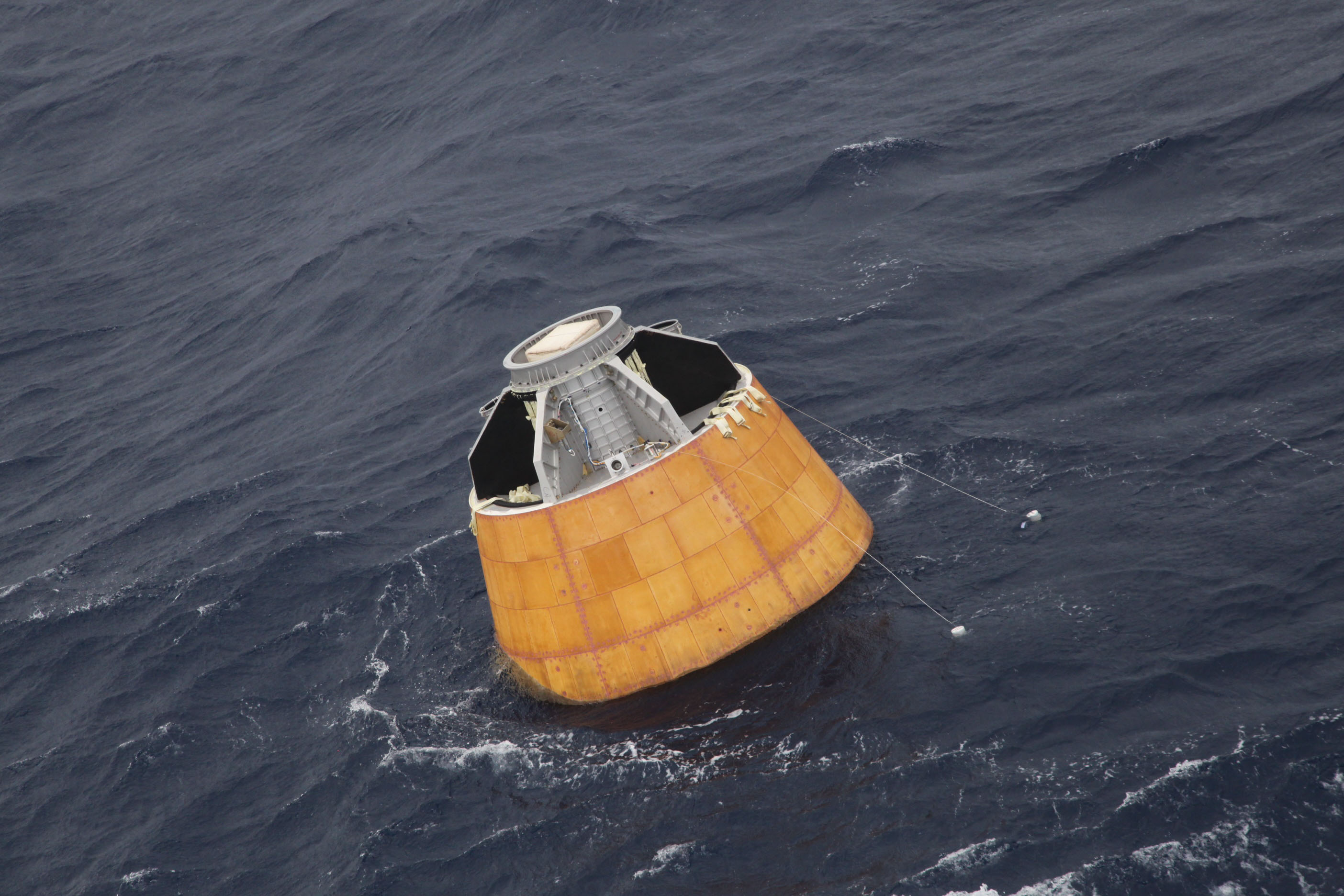
Crew Module Atmospheric Re-entry Experiment (CARE) splashdown at Bay of Bengal.

On 13 February 2014, Hindustan Aeronautics Limited handed over the first boilerplate prototype of Crew Module structural assembly to ISRO for Crew Module Atmospheric Re-entry Experiment (CARE). ISRO's Vikram Sarabhai Space Centre would equip the Crew Module with systems necessary for life support, navigation, guidance and control systems. The mission's objectives were to comprehend the reentry aerodynamics and test the effectiveness of the deceleration system by demonstrating the separation of the apex cover and the deployment of the parachute in a cluster configuration.

ISRO undertook an uncrewed test launch of the vehicle aboard the LVM3-X, for an experimental sub-orbital flight on 18 December 2014. The crew module separated from the rocket at an altitude of 126 kilometres (78 mi). On-board motors controlled and reduced the speed of the module until an altitude of 80 km (50 mi). Thrusters were shut off at that altitude and atmospheric drag further reduced speed of the capsule.

The module's heat shield was expected to experience temperature in excess of 1,600 °C (2,910 °F). Parachutes were deployed at an altitude of 15 km (9.3 mi) to slow down the module, which performed a splashdown in the Bay of Bengal near Andaman and Nicobar Islands.

This flight was used to test orbital injection, separation and re-entry procedures and systems of the Crew Capsule. Also tested were the capsule separation, heat shields and aerobraking systems, parachute deployment, retro-firing, splashdown, flotation systems, and procedures to recover the Crew Capsule from the Bay of Bengal. Inflight launch abort and parachute tests were expected to be conducted by the end of 2019.

==== Pad Abort Test ====
The Indian Space Research Organisation's Pad Abort Test was conducted successfully on 5 July 2018. A Pad Abort Test is a trial run for the spacecraft's launch abort system (sometimes called a launch escape system). This system is designed to quickly get the crew and spacecraft away from the rocket in the event of a potential failure. The technology developed is expected to be applied to the first Indian crewed spacecraft Gaganyaan, scheduled to be launched no earlier than 2024.

The countdown for the test started at 2:00 am (IST) on 5 July 2018. At 7:00 am (IST) The Crew Escape System with crew module successfully lifted-off from Satish Dhawan Space Centre. The crew module was accelerated to 10 g and reached a highest altitude of 2.75 km (1.71 mi), it later safely parachuted down and floated in the Bay of Bengal 2.9 km (1.80 mi) away from its launch site. It was carried skyward using seven solid-fueled rocket motors keeping within the safe g-force limits. Later recovery boats were sent to recover the crew module. The total duration of the test mission was 259 seconds. The test launch process was recorded by around 300 sensors. Main objectives of test were nominal 20 second ascent and 200 seconds of descent, not including the splashdown. Chute detachment was a scheduled event occurring around 259.4 seconds after launch as intended.

==== In-flight Abort Tests ====
===== Mission 1 =====
Test Vehicle Abort Mission-1 (TV-D1) was a high altitude abort test held on 21 October 2023 at around 10:00 a.m IST. The rocket launch was the second attempt of the day, with the initial try halted just five seconds before the scheduled time. The primary purpose of the test was to ensure the crew's ability to safely exit the rocket in the event of a malfunction. Originally slated for 8:00 local time, the launch was postponed for 45 minutes due to weather-related concerns. The mission aimed to test the CES's separation from the rocket, ability to maintain a trajectory leading to a safe distance, and eventual parachute deployment.

During TV-D1 mission, the crew module experience an unexpected upended orientation while being recovered by Indian Navy from Bay of Bengal. In order to mitigate the problem and improve safety, ISRO is going to test an "uprighting system" that resembles gaseous balloons and works similarly to airbags in cars to keep the crew module from toppling over in the event of lateral wind and sea wave disturbances following splashdown. Redundancy is built into the system to guard against failure.

===== Mission 2 =====
TV-D2 is scheduled to launch in Q4 2026. The crew escape mechanism will use low and high altitude escape motors, while the crew module control systems will mimic the crew seat, suspension, and uprighting systems.

==== SOLVE tests ====
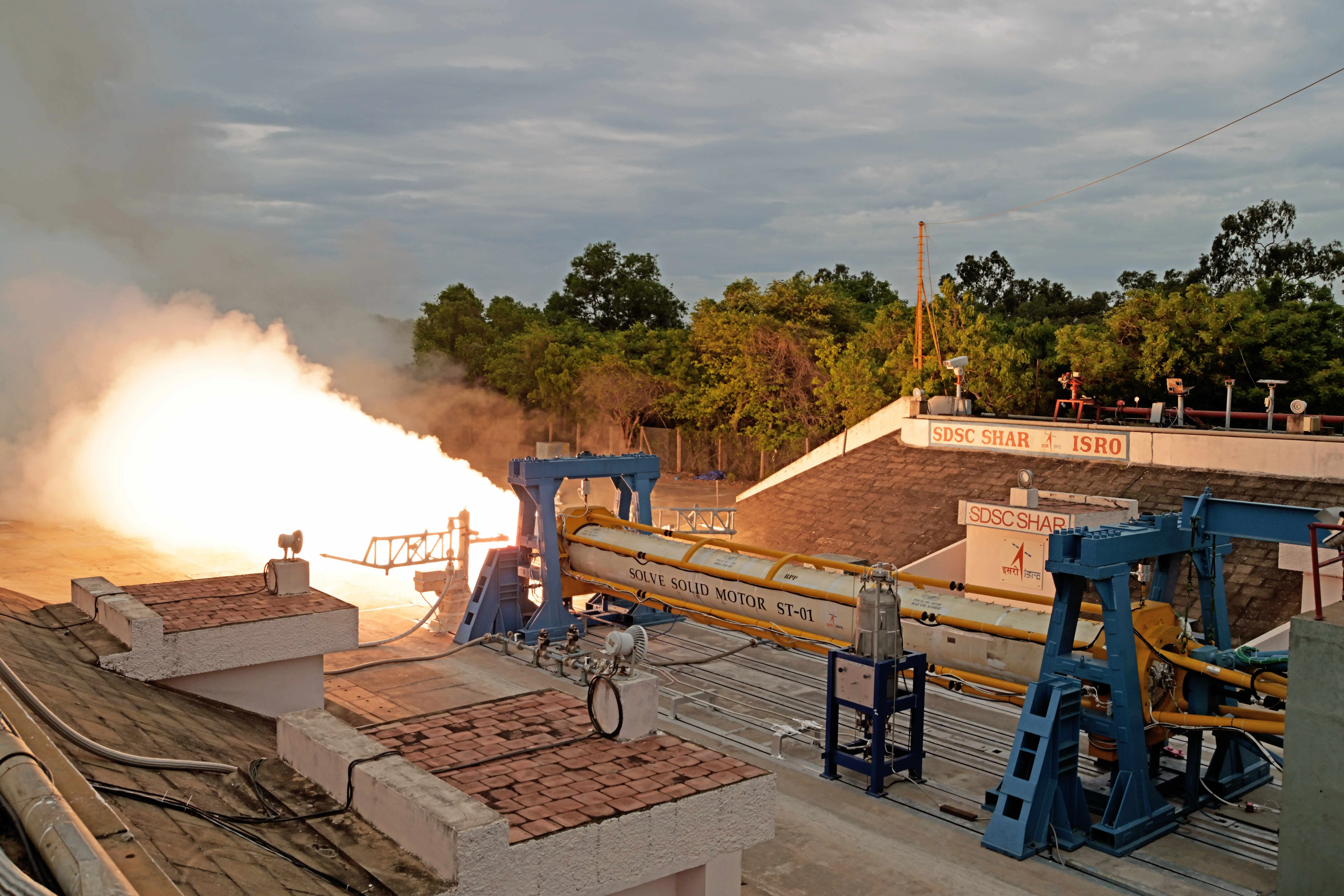
SOLVE-ST01 ground test

Following multiple integrated parachute tests, ISRO is developing a solid motor based Sub-Orbital Launch Vehicle for Experiments (SOLVE) as a test platform to carry out High-altitude Parachute Tests without using the Launch Abort system. The system uses a PSOM-XL booster from the PSLV rocket modified with the development of slow burn rate propellant and straight nozzle with additional secondary injection thrust vector control systems to loft the boilerplate up to an altitude of 10-17 kilometers.

Test	Date	Location	Capsule mass	Outcome	Notes
SOLVE ST-01	3 July 2026	SDSC ground test facilities	-	Success	Flight units prototype development ground test. A derivative booster underwent a static test firing at 10:00 IST.
Forthcoming flight tests

== Launch vehicle ==
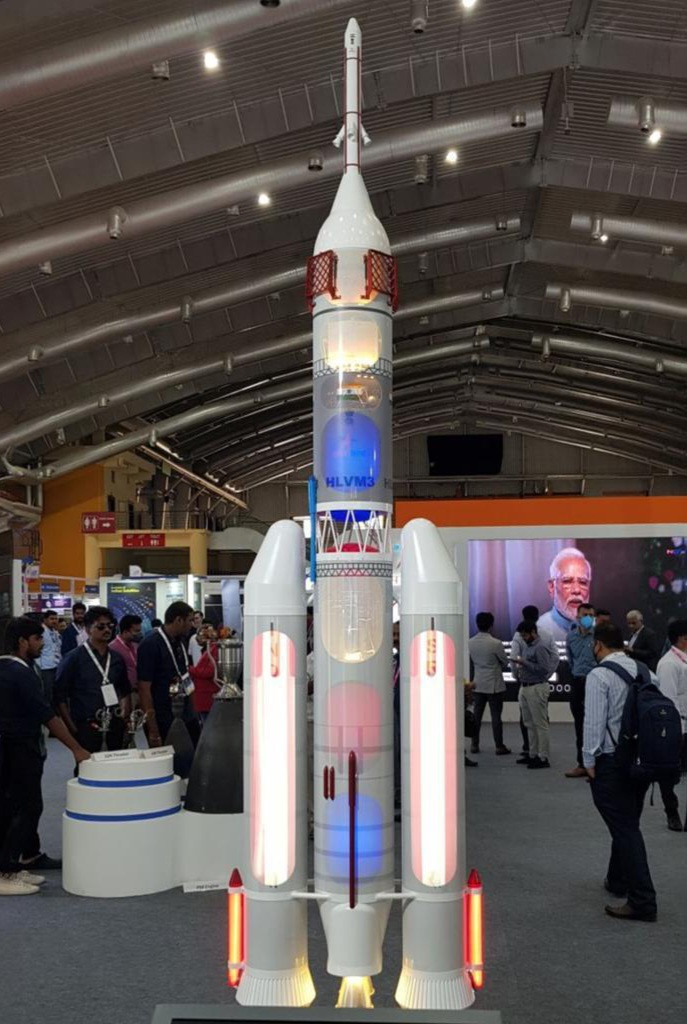
Maquette of human-rated LVM3 (HLVM3)

Following three uncrewed orbital flight demonstrations of the spacecraft, a crewed Gaganyaan is slated to be launched on the HLVM3 (Human-rated version of LVM3) launcher.

While the LVM3 is being human rated for Gaganyaan project, the rocket was designed with potential human spaceflight applications in consideration. The maximum acceleration during ascent phase of flight was limited to 4 Gs for crew comfort and a 5-metre (16 ft) diameter payload fairing was used to be able to accommodate large modules like space station segments. The aerodynamic characterization research was conducted at the National Aerospace Laboratories' 1.2m Trisonic Wind Tunnel Facility.

Furthermore, a number of changes to make safety-critical subsystems reliable are planned for lower operating margins, redundancy, stringent qualification requirements, revaluation and strengthening of components. Avionics improvements includes an Integrated Health Monitoring System (LVHM), Dual chain Telemetry & Telecommand Processor (TTCP) and Quad-redundant Navigation and Guidance Computer (NGC). The High Thrust Vikas engines (HTVE) of L110 core stage will operate at a chamber pressure of 58.5 bar instead of 62 bar and the Human rated S200 boosters (HS200) will operate at chamber pressure of 55.5 bar instead of 58.8 bar. Segment joints will have three O-rings each. Electro mechanical actuators and digital stage controllers will be employed in all stages of launch vehicle.

Gaganyaan's green propellant development was confirmed by K. Sivan, and it will be used in all stages of HLVM3. In order to stop rocket engines from emitting chlorinated exhaust products, ISRO has started the development of an environmentally benign solid propellant based on Glycidyl Azide Polymer (GAP) as fuel and Ammonium dinitramide (ADN) as oxidizer. Green propellant combinations including hydrogen peroxide, kerosene, liquid oxygen, liquid methane, ADN-methanol-water, ADN-glycerol-water are all part of the technology demonstration projects that ISRO is conducting. With the use of electric propulsion for spacecraft and the acceptance of liquid oxygen/liquid hydrogen and LOX/kerosene based propulsion systems for launch vehicles, ISRO has already started the transition towards environmentally benign and green propellants. Currently in use in the cryogenic upper stages of the GSLV and LVM3 is the LOX/LH2 mix. In place of traditional hydrazine, ISRO developed ISROSENE, a rocket grade version of kerosene. In the South Asia Satellite, ISRO has effectively proven an electric propulsion technology for station keeping operations.

=== S200 booster qualification ===
On 17 November 2020, Larsen & Toubro (L&T) delivered the first piece of hardware—a booster segment—for the Gaganyaan launch vehicle LVM3. The Powai Aerospace Manufacturing Facility in Mumbai, owned by L&T, is where the booster segment was manufactured. The crucial booster segment is 3.2 meters in diameter, 8.5 meters long, and 5.5 tons in weight.

The human-rated variant of the S200 solid strap-on booster, or 'HS200', was developed for the Gaganyaan programme in collaboration with Larsen & Toubro. The first static fire test of HS200 was conducted on 13 May 2022 at Satish Dhawan Space Centre (SDSC) for a duration of 135 seconds, carrying 203 tons of solid propellant. During the test, about 700 parameters were monitored and the performance of all the systems were normal. The second-largest functioning solid propellant booster in the world is 20 meters in length and 3.2 meters in diameter.

Like all systems for Gaganyaan mission, the HS200 booster was designed with a number of enhancements intended to increase the safety and dependability of different systems. The enhancements include stronger ignition and insulation systems, improved digital control electronics as well as extra safety features for motor case joints. This booster's control system makes use of one of the strongest electro-mechanical actuators available, complete with many redundancies and safety measures. The enhancement of S200 solid strap-on booster resulted in a decrease in chamber pressure, increased robustness, proof-leakability, and higher margins.

=== Vikas engine qualification ===
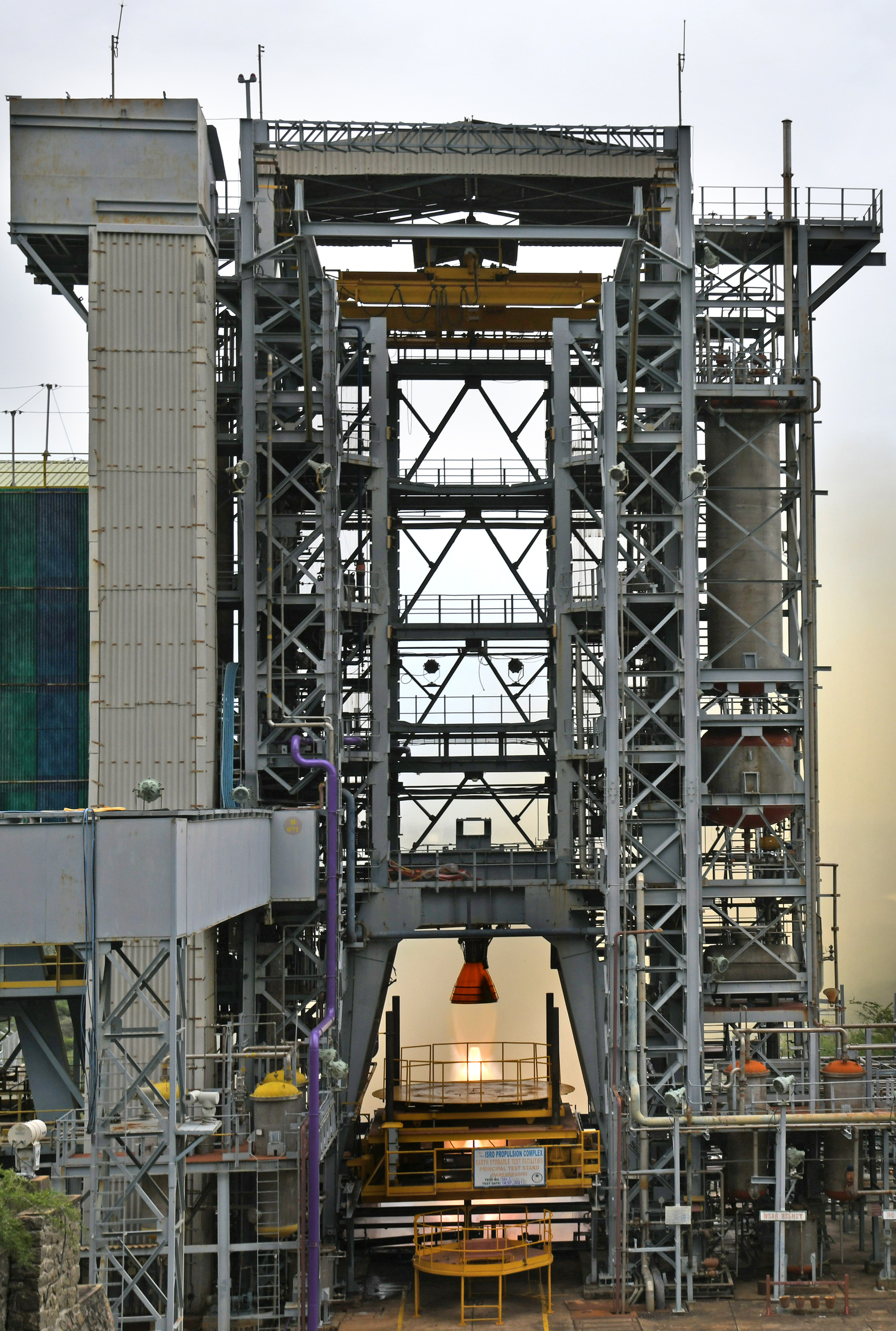
Long duration hot test of Vikas engine at ISRO Propulsion Complex.

Vikas engine variants are used to power the second stage of the Polar Satellite Launch Vehicle (PSLV), boosters and second stage of the Geosynchronous Satellite Launch Vehicle (GSLV) Mark I and II, and also the core stage of LVM3.

On 14 July 2021, ISRO conducted third long duration hot test of Vikas engine for core L110 liquid stage of GSLV Mark III at ISRO Propulsion Complex as part of the engine qualification requirements of the Gaganyaan mission. The engine was successfully test fired for a duration of 240 seconds validating all the required performance parameters.

On 20 January 2022, High Thrust Vikas Engine successfully underwent a hot qualification test for duration of 25 seconds at ISRO Propulsion Complex to validate engine robustness under non-nominal operating conditions for fuel-oxidiser mixture ratio and chamber pressure.

The first human-rated L110 Vikas engine for the Gaganyaan human spaceflight mission was delivered by Godrej Enterprises Group to Liquid Propulsion Systems Center on 13 November 2025.

=== CE-20 engine qualification ===
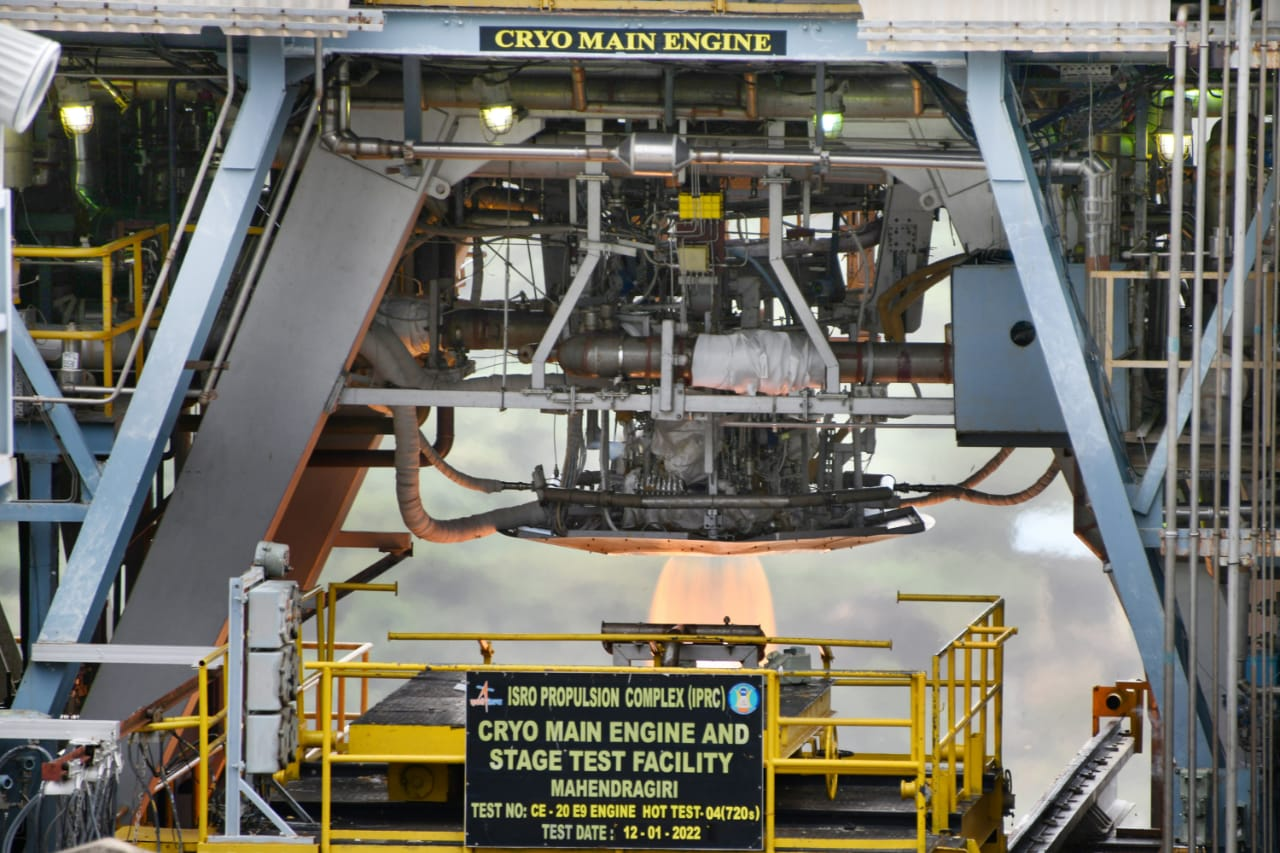
CE-20 E9 cryogenic engine underwent a 720-second hot test at IPRC.

On 12 January 2022, ISRO conducted a hot qualification test on CE-20 cryogenic engine for a duration of 720 seconds at ISRO Propulsion Complex (IPRC). On October 28, 2022, CE-20 E11 successfully completed a Pressure Chamber Test for 30 seconds at IPRC. It was done to check the efficacy of the engine for Gaganyaan missions. On November 9, 2022, the duration was increased to 70 seconds. The test results were on expected lines as per ISRO sources.

On 21 February 2024, ISRO announced that the performance of the primary cryogenic engine that will be installed on the LVM3 launch vehicles for Gaganyaan has been verified and approved for use in human spaceflight missions. Vacuum testing of the CE-20 cryogenic engine, the seventh in the series, took place at the High Altitude Test Facility in Mahendragiri on 14 February 2024. In contrast to the minimal standard period for human rating of 6,350 seconds (1 hour 45 minutes), the CE-20 was previously put through 39 hot fire tests under various operating conditions, lasting 8,810 seconds (2 hours 26 minutes). Even the flight engine, which was designated for the inaugural Gaganyaan mission, has finished the acceptance testing, according to ISRO. The flight engine, which powers the upper stages of the LVM3, has an impulse of 442.5 seconds and a thrust capacity of 19–22 tons.

According to ISRO, life demonstration tests, endurance tests, and performance evaluations under nominal operating settings as well as off-nominal conditions with regard to thrust, mixture ratio, and propellant tank pressure were all part of the ground qualification testing for the human rating of the CE-20 engine. The CE-20 engine's ground certification tests for the Gaganyaan program have all been successfully finished.

== Launches ==
=== Test launches ===
List of test launches with Gaganyaan
No.	Mission	Date	Regime	Launcher	Payload	Outcome	Photo
1	SRE-1	10 January 2007	Low Earth orbit (637 km)	PSLV C7	SRE-1	Success	
1	SRE-1	Capability demonstration for the safe return of an orbiting capsule to Earth.					
2	CARE	18 December 2014	Sub-orbit (125.2 km)	LVM3-X	Crew Module boilerplate	Success	
2	CARE	Sub-orbital test of scaled down boilerplate Gaganyaan capsule launched aboard the sub-orbital first test flight of ISRO's LVM3.					
3	ISRO PAT	5 July 2018	Atmospheric (2.75 km)	LES	Crew Module boilerplate	Success	
3	ISRO PAT	4-minute test of Gaganyaan's Launch abort system from launch pad at Satish Dhawan Space Centre.					
4	TV-D1	21 October 2023	Atmospheric (15 km)	Gaganyaan Abort Test Booster	Crew Module / Abort system	Success	
4	TV-D1	High-altitude abort test using GSLV's L40 stage as booster. Crew Escape System (CES) in-flight abort demonstration at Mach 1.2.					
5	TV-D2	Q4 2026	Atmospheric	Gaganyaan Abort Test Booster	Crew Module / Abort system	Planned	
5	TV-D2	Uncrewed mission to test flight parameters. Crew Escape System (CES) in-flight abort demonstration at Mach 1.4. Use of modified L40 stage from GSLV.					
6	TV-A1	NET 2027	Atmospheric	Gaganyaan Abort Test Booster	Crew Module / Abort system	Planned	
6	TV-A1	Mission configurations are being finalised.					
7	TV-A2	NET 2027	Atmospheric	Gaganyaan Abort Test Booster	Crew Module / Abort system	Planned	
7	TV-A2	Mission configurations are being finalised.					
8	Gaganyaan-1	NET Q4 2026	Low Earth orbit	HLVM3	Gaganyaan with Vyommitra	Planned	
8	Gaganyaan-1	First end-to-end orbital test flight of Gaganyaan capsule carrying Vyommitra, the humanoid robot, in a depressurized crew chamber. Test flight of uprated C32 cryogenic upper-stage.					
9	Gaganyaan-2	NET 2027	Low Earth orbit	HLVM3	Gaganyaan with Vyommitra	Planned	
9	Gaganyaan-2	Second end-to-end orbital test flight of Gaganyaan capsule. Planned to last 8 to 24 hours with rigorous testing of environment and life support systems.					
10	Gaganyaan-3	NET 2027	Low Earth orbit	HLVM3	Gaganyaan with Vyommitra	Planned	
10	Gaganyaan-3	Third end-to-end orbital test flight of Gaganyaan capsule.					

=== Operational launches ===
List of operational Gaganyaan launches
No.	Mission	Launch	Landing	Regime	Launcher	Crew / Cargo	Duration	Orbits	Status	Notes
1	Gaganyaan-4 (H1)	NET 2027		Low Earth orbit	HLVM3	(India) TBD	7 days	TBA	Planned	First crewed flight of Gaganyaan, carrying an Indian astronaut on a short orbital test flight.
2	Gaganyaan-5 (H2)	NET 2028		Low Earth orbit	HLVM3	(India) TBD	TBA		Planned	Second crewed flight of Gaganyaan; First multi-crew mission carrying 1-3 Indian astronauts on a short orbital test flight.
3	Gaganyaan-C1	TBA		Low Earth orbit	HLVM3	Docking	TBA		Planned	Proposed docking experiments.
4	Gaganyaan-C2	TBA		Low Earth orbit (~420 km)	HLVM3	ISS resupply	TBA		Planned	Proposed in collaboration with International partners as ISRO's first International Space Station cargo resupply mission.
5	Gaganyaan-C3	TBA		Low Earth orbit (~450 km)	HLVM3	BAS resupply	TBA		Planned	ISRO's first Bharatiya Antariksh Station cargo resupply mission.

== See also ==
- Human Space Flight Centre
- Bharatiya Antariksh Station
- Indian Human Spaceflight Programme
- List of Indian astronauts
