= Test Vehicle Abort Mission-2 =

Planned Indian spaceflight test

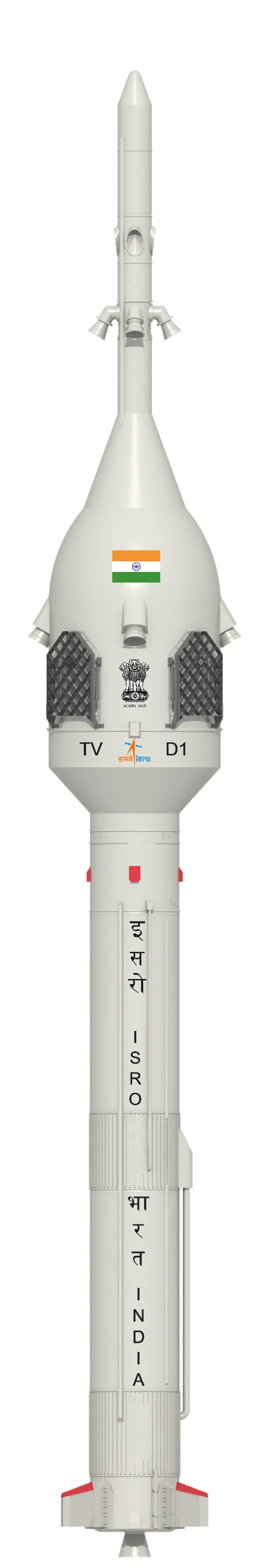
- Simulated TV-D model
- Names: Test Vehicle Abort Mission-2; TV-D2
- Mission type: In-flight abort test
- Operator: ISRO
- Mission duration: ~20 minutes

Spacecraft properties
- Spacecraft type: Gaganyaan boilerplate
- Manufacturer: Hindustan Aeronautics Limited
- Dimensions: Length: 34.954 m Diameter: 2.1 m (stage) , 4.05 m (CES)

Start of mission
- Launch date: Q4 2026
- Rocket: Gaganyaan Abort Test Booster (modified GSLV L40 stage)
- Launch site: First Launch Pad Satish Dhawan Space Centre

End of mission
- Landing site: Bay of Bengal

Test Vehicle Abort Mission-2 (TV-D2) will be a high altitude abort test of the Gaganyaan program, planned to be held in late-2026. India is the fourth country, after Russia, the United States, and China, to have previously tested this technology after the TV-D1 mission.

== Background ==
In April 2022, it was proposed that demonstration missions for in-flight aborts of the Gaganyaan crew capsule should be tested with a depressurized crew module. On 10 August 2022 ISRO performed a successful static test of the Crew Escape System (CES). On 21st October 2023, ISRO conducted the TV-D1 as the first development flight for the Gaganyaan program.

The crew escape mechanism will use low and high altitude escape motors, while the crew module control systems will mimic the crew seat, suspension, and uprighting systems. The mission will be uncrewed and used to test flight abort parameters. The Crew Escape System (CES) in-flight abort system will be used at Mach 1.4. The L40 stage will be shut down at Mach 1.9 and the Crew module will commence an abort at Mach 1.6,followed by vehicle Reaction Control Systems firing to reorientation, parachute deployment as in nominal re-entry mission leading to safe CM touchdown and recovery. Like TV-D1, TV-D2 will use a modified L40 stage from GSLV as its booster rocket. The Booster and boilerplate module have been built by May 2026. Gaganyaan-1, the first orbital test flight, is planned to take after this flight.

TV-D2 was originally scheduled for Q3 2025. This would be delayed to Q4 2026. In an August 5, 2026 press release the Indian Parliament stated that "activities are in progress" regarding TV-D2's flight, with no further details.

== Mission objectives ==
- Flight demonstration and evaluation of the test vehicle subsystems
- Flight demonstration and evaluation of the CES, including various separation systems
- Crew Module characteristics and demonstration of deceleration systems at higher altitude and its recovery

== See also ==
- Indian Human Spaceflight Programme
- Launch escape system
- Little Joe (rocket)
- Ascent Abort-2
