= ADRDE =

ADRDE may refer to:

- Air Defence Research and Development Establishment, a British Army radar research organization
- Aerial Delivery Research and Development Establishment, an Indian air-delivery research organization
