= Gaganyaan-5 =

Indian spaceflight, planned for 2027

- Names: H2
- Mission type: Indian Human Spaceflight Programme technology demonstration
- Operator: ISRO
- Mission duration: TBA
- Orbits completed: TBA

Spacecraft properties
- Spacecraft: Gaganyaan
- Manufacturer: Hindustan Aeronautics Limited

Start of mission
- Launch date: Q3 2027
- Rocket: HLVM3
- Launch site: Satish Dhawan Space Centre
- Contractor: ISRO

Orbital parameters
- Reference system: Geocentric orbit
- Regime: Low Earth orbit

Gaganyaan-5 (from Sanskrit: gagana, "celestial" and yāna, "craft, vehicle") also named H2 will be the second crewed test flight of the Gaganyaan programme. The launch is planned for 2027.
