= Vyommitra =

Indian robot astronaut

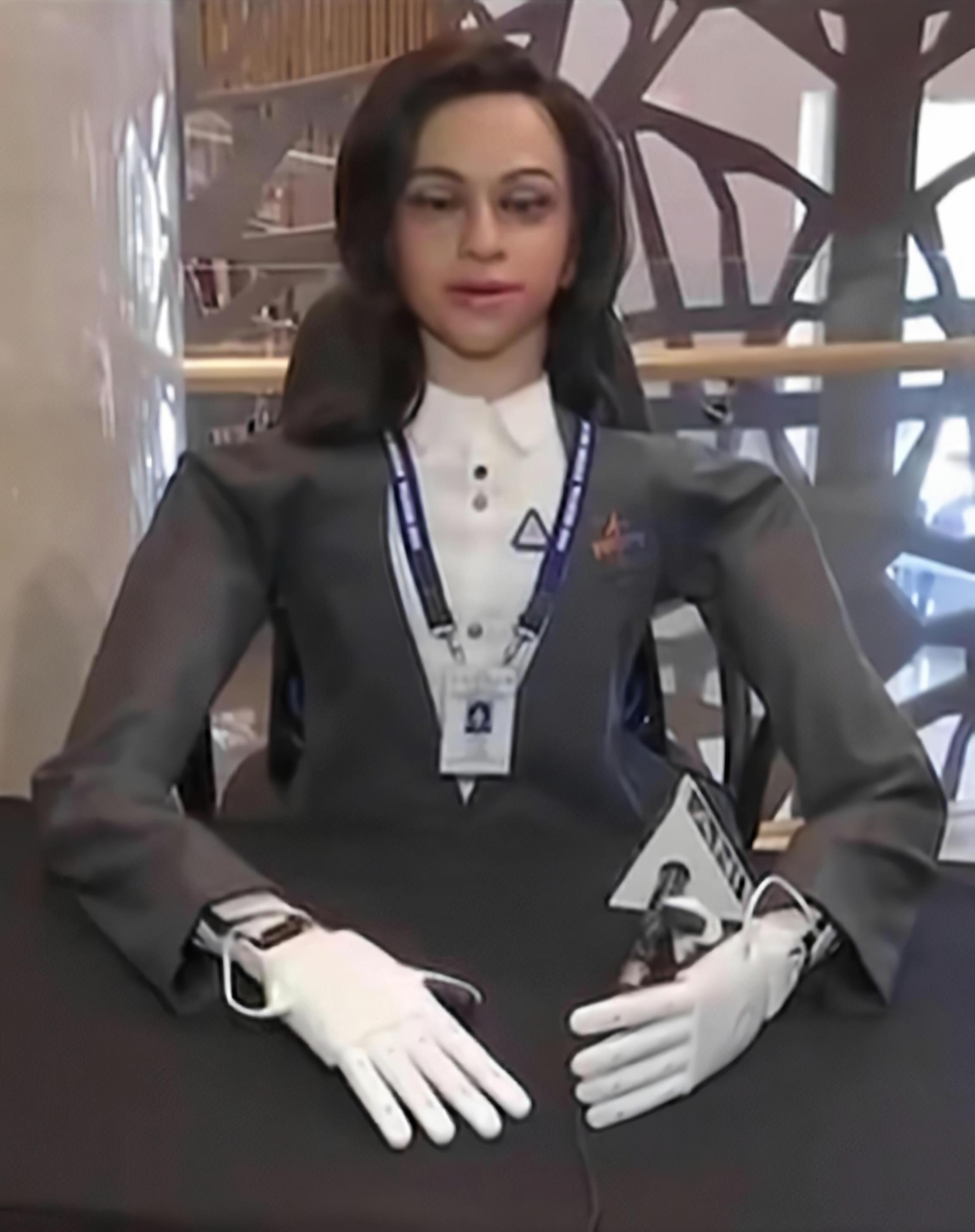
- Manufacturer: ISRO
- Country: India
- Year of creation: 2020; 6 years ago
- Type: Humanoid robot
- Purpose: Space-faring robot

Vyommitra (Sanskrit: Vyōma "space", Mitra "friend") is a humanoid robot with appearance of a woman designed for space travel. It was designed at the Vikram Sarabhai Space Centre in Thiruvananthapuram, Kerala and developed by ISRO to function aboard the spacecraft Gaganyaan, a crewed orbital spacecraft. Vyommitra was first unveiled on 22 January 2020 at the Human Spaceflight and Exploration Symposium in Bengaluru, Karnataka.

Built mostly out of an aluminium alloy to withstand high pressure and vibrations, It will accompany Indian astronauts on space missions and be a part of uncrewed experimental Gaganyaan missions before the crewed flights. It was planned to take its first flight to space on the Gaganyaan-2 mission in 2026, but was later decided to also fly on the Gaganyaan-1 mission, which is now planned for H2 2026.

== Objectives and abilities ==
The robot is part of the ISRO's aim to substitute animals with humanoid robots on experimental missions, with the goal of better understanding the effects of prolonged exposure to radiation and microgravity environments on the human body during space travel.

Vyommitra can mimic human activity, recognise various humans, and respond to their queries in both Hindi and English. The robot is expected to be aboard uncrewed Gaganyaan missions to conduct experiments in microgravity environments and monitor module parameters. In crewed missions, it will also support astronauts by simulating human functions. It can handle environment control and life support systems, perform switch panel operations, and give environmental air pressure change warnings.

The prototype models of Vyommitra have finished trials, and the engineering models are undergoing trials. The Vyommitra flight model to be used in the Gaganyaan missions is also being built by the ISRO.Union Minister of State, Jitendra Singh, said in early February 2024 that the uncrewed Vyommitra mission is scheduled for the third quarter of 2024, while the crewed mission is scheduled for launch in 2025.

== Flights ==
On 28 April 2026, ISRO commenced the pre-flight integration process for Vyommitra ahead of the Gaganyaan-1 flight, scheduled to be launched later that year.

== See also ==
- Indian Human Spaceflight Programme
- Gaganyaan
- Fedor
- Kirobo
- Robonaut
