= Space Capsule Recovery Experiment =

Indian spacecraft

SRE-1
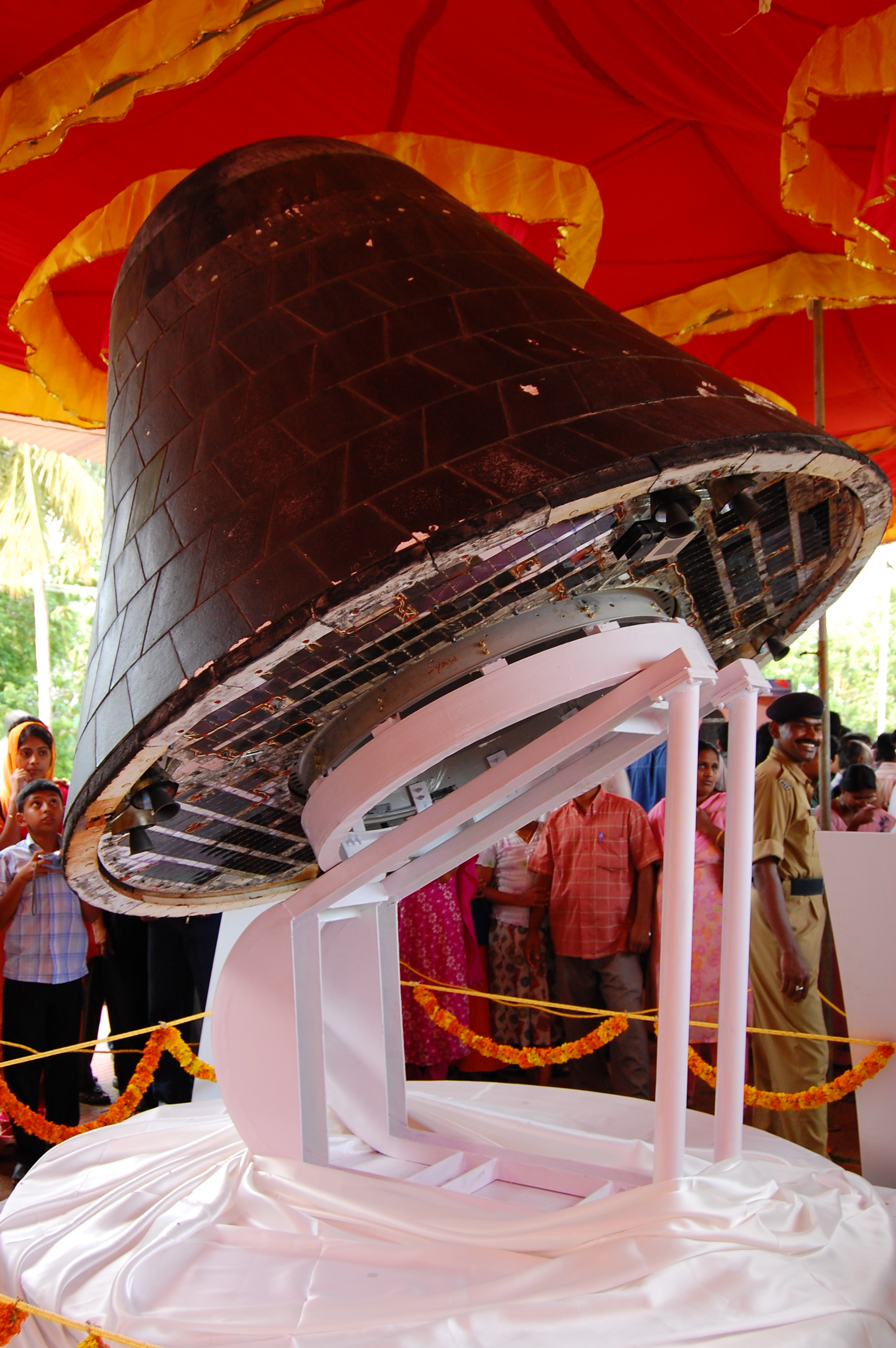
- The SRE-1 spacecraft on public display at Thiruvananthapuram in April 2007
- Mission type: Technology
- Operator: ISRO
- COSPAR ID: 2007-001C
- SATCAT no.: 29711
- Mission duration: 12 days

Spacecraft properties
- Manufacturer: ISRO
- Launch mass: 555 kilograms (1,224 lb)

Start of mission
- Launch date: 10 January 2007, 03:54 UTC
- Rocket: PSLV PSLV C7
- Launch site: Satish Dhawan FLP
- Contractor: ISRO

End of mission
- Landing date: 22 January 2007, 04:16 UTC
- Landing site: Bay of Bengal

Orbital parameters
- Reference system: Geocentric
- Regime: Low Earth

The Space Capsule Recovery Experiment (SCRE or more commonly SRE or SRE-1) is an Indian experimental spacecraft which was launched at 03:53 UTC on January 10, 2007, from Sriharikota by the Indian Space Research Organisation (ISRO). The launch was conducted using the C7 launch of the PSLV rocket, along with three other satellites. It remained in orbit for 12 days before re-entering the Earth's atmosphere and splashing down into the Bay of Bengal at 04:16 UTC on January 22.

== Overview ==
SRE-1 was designed to demonstrate the capability to recover an orbiting space capsule, and the technology of an orbiting platform for performing experiments in microgravity conditions. It was also intended to test reusable Thermal Protection System, navigation, guidance and control, hypersonic aero-thermodynamics, management of communication blackout, deceleration and flotation system and recovery operations. The data obtained from the SRE mission was useful for the design and construction of the Gaganyaan Crew Module.

== Design ==
SRE-1 is a 555 kg capsule. It comprises aero-thermo structure, internal structure, Mission Management Unit, Altitude sensors and Inertial measurement unit, S-band transponder with unique belt array antenna embedded to ATS, power and electronics packages to support deceleration and flotation system. It also houses two microgravity payloads. It has a sphere-cone-flare configuration with a spherical nose of about 0.5 m radius, base diameter of 2 m and 1.6 m height. The parachute, pyro devices, avionics packages of triggering unit and sequencer, telemetry and tracking system and sensors for measurement of system performance parameters are placed inside the SRE-1 capsule. Parachutes for SRE capsule were provided by Aerial Delivery Research and Development Establishment (ADRDE).

To withstand the heat of re-entry, the cone-shaped SRE-1 has a thermal protection system composed of 264 silica tiles of 14 different types over conical surface, and an ablative nose cap of carbon-phenolic composite. Scaled replica of SRE with this thermal protection system was validated in Plasma Wind Tunnel facility of CIRA, Italy. ISRO is also working on technology to manufacture carbon-carbon composite TPS, which, along with the silica tiles tested with the SRE-1, could find use in future reusable spacecraft such as ISRO's planned Reusable Launch Vehicle.

== Re-entry ==
SRE-1 was traveling around the Earth in a circular polar orbit at an altitude of 637 kilometers. In preparation for its reentry, SRE-1 was put into an elliptical orbit with a perigee of 485 kilometers and an apogee of 639 kilometers by issuing commands from the spacecraft control centre of ISTRAC at Bangalore on January 19, 2007. The critical de-boost operations were executed from SCC, Bangalore supported by a network of ground stations at Bangalore, Lucknow, Sriharikota, Mauritius, Biak in Indonesia, Saskatoon in Canada, Svalbard in Norway besides shipborne and airborne terminals.

On January 22, 2007, the re-orientation of SRE-1 capsule for de-boost operations commenced at 08:42 am IST. The de-boost started at 09:00 am with the firing of on-board rocket motors and the operations were completed at 09:10 am. At 09:17 am, SRE-1 capsule was reoriented for its re-entry into the dense atmosphere. The capsule made its re-entry at 09:37 am at an altitude of 100 kilometers with a velocity of 8 km/s (ca. 29,000 km/h). During its reentry, the capsule was protected from the intense heat by carbon phenolic ablative material and silica tiles on its outer surface.

By the time SRE-1 descended to an altitude of 5 km, aerodynamic braking had considerably reduced its velocity to 101 m/s (364 km/h). Pilot and drogue parachute deployments helped in further reducing its velocity to 47 m/s (169 km/h).

=== Splashdown and recovery ===
The main parachute was deployed at about 2 km altitude. SRE-1 splashed down in the Bay of Bengal with a velocity of 12 m/s (43 km/h) at 09:46 am IST (04:16 am UTC). The flotation system, which was immediately triggered, kept the capsule afloat. Recovery operations were supported and carried out by the Indian Coast Guard and Indian Navy using ships, aircraft and helicopters.

=== Disposition ===
Following recovery of all payloads, the SRE capsule has been put on display at the VSSC museum in Trivandrum.

== Experiments and results ==
During its stay in orbit, the following two experiments on board SRE-1 were successfully conducted under microgravity conditions.

- One of the experiments studied metal melting and crystallisation under microgravity conditions. This experiment, jointly designed by the Indian Institute of Science, Bangalore and Vikram Sarabhai Space Centre, Thiruvananthapuram, was performed in an isothermal heating furnace.
- The second experiment, jointly designed by National Metallurgical Laboratory, Jamshedpur and ISRO Satellite Centre Bangalore, studied the synthesis of nano-crystals under microgravity conditions. This was an experiment in designing biomaterials that better replicate natural biological products. The experimental results have yet to be analysed.

Performance of Silica TPS tiles in conical region of capsule was satisfactory and tile surfaces were found intact with some minor handling related damage during recovery operations. The spacecraft remained afloat for approximately two hours in seawater before recovery, causing minor cracks and seawater deposits on tile surfaces.

== See also ==
- SRE-2
- CARE
- List of Indian satellites
- Atmospheric Reentry Demonstrator (ARD was a suborbital reentry test vehicle built by Aérospatiale of France for the European Space Agency and flown on the third Ariane 5 flight on October 21, 1998)

== Bibliography ==
- ISRO Presentation on Day 1 of the 14th annual meeting of the Asia Pacific Regional Space Agency Forum
