= Gaganyaan-1 =

Indian spaceflight, planned H2 2026

- Names: G1
- Mission type: Uncrewed flight test
- Operator: ISRO

Spacecraft properties
- Spacecraft: Gaganyaan
- Manufacturer: Hindustan Aeronautics Limited

Start of mission
- Launch date: February 2027 or later (planned)
- Rocket: HLVM3
- Launch site: Satish Dhawan Space Centre

Orbital parameters
- Reference system: Geocentric orbit
- Regime: Low Earth orbit

Gaganyaan-1 (from Sanskrit: gagana, "celestial" and yāna, "craft, vehicle") is the first planned uncrewed test flight of the Gaganyaan programme. ISRO has officially scheduled the mission for 2027.

The spacecraft will carry Vyommitra, a half-humanoid robot, to simulate astronaut conditions and provide critical data on life-support and environmental systems. The mission will demonstrate the performance of the crew module and service module in low Earth orbit, serving as a precursor to future human spaceflight under the Indian Human Spaceflight Programme.

== Background ==
The launch was originally scheduled for December 2020, then in December 2021, but it was delayed due to the COVID-19 pandemic. The flight plan was finally ready by April 2022 and the launch was expected to take place in early 2025, after TV-D1, TV-D2, TV-D3 and TV-D4. It was proposed in April 2022 that the crew module should be depressurized, something kept in the final planning.

The first orbiter module adaptor assembly (OMA) was supplied by Kineco Kaman Composites on 23 December 2023. The OMA is a conical structure with a diameter of 4 meters, composed of carbon-fiber-reinforced polymers. It is combined with the equipment bay shroud and crew escape module. With the successful qualification of the rocket's engines in February 2024, the mission was scheduled for December 2024, following which it was rescheduled to February 2025, then to Q4 of 2025 and then H2 2026. In June 2026, ISRO chairman V. Narayanan stated that the launch was now expected in Q4 of 2026, but in November it was delayed to February 2027 (or after) due to aditional testing.

== Mission objectives ==
The Gaganyaan spacecraft will be launched, with the humanoid robot Vyommitra, by a Human-rated LVM 3 from Satish Dhawan Space Centre and inserted into a 170 x 408 km orbit. The circularisation maneuver will be performed at the third orbit. The landing should follow the same pattern as the TV-D1. The mission will also validate the life-support system, crew escape mechanism, and re-entry technologies.

After this mission, ISRO will perform four more abort tests before launching Gaganyaan-2, carrying the humanoid robot Vyommitra, which was later decided that it will also fly on G-1.

== Mission history ==
=== Pre-launch processing ===
The L110 stage for the upgraded LVM3 vehicle arrived at Satish Dhawan Space Center in July 2024, followed by the S200 boosters. A Different Upper stage, the C-32, will be used in lieu of the C-25 for this mission. The C-32 underwent heavy tests for the flight.

The Crew module was tested and checked out from its propulsion and mechanical systems testing phase at the Vikram Sarabhai Space Centre and the service module was tested at U. R. Rao Satellite Centre. G1 will carry Vyomitra, and also an unpressurized engineering model of the Environmental Control and Life Support System (ECLSS) system.

ISRO is planning to place chartered ships carrying a group of eight scientists to be stationed at observation points in the Pacific Ocean and the North Atlantic Ocean, to monitor the uncrewed mission. A consignment with a shipborne terminal (SBT), electronic equipment, MV-SAT antennas and its associated subsystems will be sent abroad from ISTRAC for deployment on these chartered ships. This is similar to what was done for the launch of the Mars Orbiter Mission. By December 2024, all components of the first HLVM3 has reached SDSC. The spacecraft was also reported as in its final stages of integration.The ground station and associated infrastructure was also built before launch.

The first segment of solid motor was transferred from the production factory to the launch complex on December 13, 2024. At SDSC, ISRO started assembling the HLVM3 on 18 December 2024. At the launch complex, the HLVM3's L110 and C32 stages are prepared. SDSC also received the components for the crew escape system. The crew module is being integrated at the VSSC, while the service module is being integrated at the URSC. It will also be the site of orbital module level integration and testing.

The Crew Module Propulsion System (CMPS), a bi-propellant Reaction Control System (RCS) enabling three-axis control, has been successfully incorporated into the crew module by the Liquid Propulsion Systems Centre (LPSC) on 21 January 2025. The crew module for Gaganyaan-1 has been shipped out. LPSC has also integrated the Crew Module Uprighting System (CMUS) supplied by Vikram Sarabhai Space Centre. CMPS is vital for descent and atmospheric entry. The CMPS has a propellant feed system with accompanying fluid control components, a pressurization system with high-pressure gas bottles, and 12 thrusters, each of which can produce 100N of force. Additional integration activities, such as avionics package assembly and electrical harnessing inspections, will be performed on the Gaganyaan-1 crew module at VSSC. For the last stage of Orbital Module integration, the crew module will be delivered to URSC. The Crew escape system was also integrated at SDSC and commenced vibration tests at the facility.

On 5 May 2025, a set of parachutes designed by the Aerial Delivery Research and Development Establishment was shipped out. These parachutes are necessary for the safe return of the crew module. At the ISRO Satellite Integration and Testing Establishment, the ADRDE team will put the parachutes together with the crew module. Ten parachutes are included in the parachute setup, which is intended for consecutive deployment. The deployment of two apex cover separation parachutes initiates the recovery phase during flight. Followed by two drogue parachutes for stabilization, and to lower the crew module's velocity. When the drogue parachutes are released, three pilot chutes will be sent out to separate the three main parachutes. The purpose of the primary parachutes is to lower the crew module's speed to a safe landing level. The vehicle and the HLVM-3 was completely integrated and tested by mid-December 2025.

On 10 April 2026, the Gaganyaan-1's crew module successfully underwent air drop test. According to ISRO officials the Indian Air Force’s Chinook helicopter dropped the crew module from an to an altitude of about 3 km off the Satish Dhawan Space Centre (SHAR) in the Bay of Bengal and released it over a designated drop zone in sea near the coast.

ISRO conducted several successful crew module and service module separation tests in October 2026 for the G1 uncrewed mission.

== Payloads ==
As the mission serves as a precursor, no astronaut will launch aboard the flight. Instead, scientific instruments and the Vyommitra humanoid robot will launch aboard the flight. Integration of Vyommitra on the spacecraft began on 28 April 2026 with critical systems tests and installation.

Scientists from the Tata Institute of Fundamental Research and researchers from the University of Agricultural Sciences, Dharwad in collaboration with IIST are planning to launch Fruit Flies (Drosophila melanogaster) on board the mission.

== Bibliography ==
- Jones, Andrew (23 February 2021). "India revises Gaganyaan human spaceflight plan, delays Chandrayaan-3". Space News.
- PTI (28 June 2021). "First uncrewed mission of Gaganyaan in December: It's race against time for ISRO now". The Hindu.
- Kumar, Chethan (28 April 2022). "First Gaganyaan uncrewed module to be injected in 170x408km orbit; indicates human spaceflight profile". Times of India.
- Kumar, Chenthan (29 April 2022). "Gaganyaan: First uncrewed mission to have unpressurised crew module". Times of India.
- Bagla, Pallava (18 May 2022). "Mission Gaganyaan: Better safe than starry". Economic Times.
- TNN (1 July 2022). "Chennai: Indian Space Research Organisation to carry out series of tests before launch of Gaganyaan". Times of India.
- ANI (13 September 2022). "First trial for Gaganyaan to be done by end of 2023, or beginning of 2024: Jitendra Singh". Times of India.
- Ramesh, Sandhya (4 December 2022). "India's first human spaceflight Gaganyan in limbo, astronauts partially trained, ISRO silent". ThePrint.
- "Gaganyaan launch delayed: Manned mission now in 'fourth quarter of 2024'". Times of India. 21 December 2022.
- "Govt shares an update on Gaganyaan, first abort mission likely in two months". 16 March 2023.
