= ISRO Pad Abort Test =

Indian Space Research Organization launch test

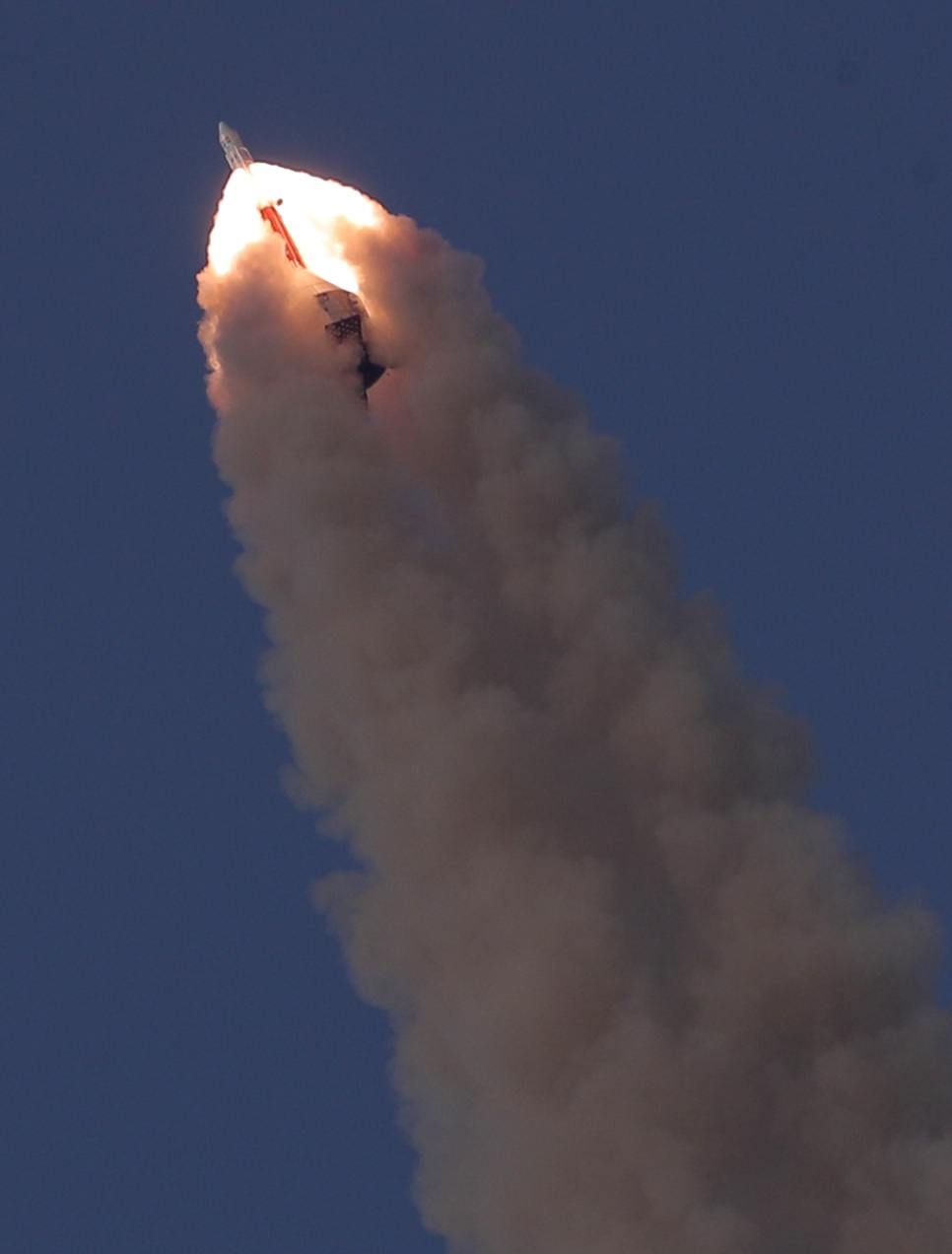
- Mission type: Launch escape system
- Operator: ISRO
- Mission duration: 4 minutes, 25 seconds
- Apogee: 2.75 km (1.71 mi),

Spacecraft properties
- Spacecraft type: Gaganyaan's boilerplate vehicle
- Manufacturer: ISRO
- Launch mass: 12.6 ton

Start of mission
- Launch date: 5 July 2018
- Launch site: Satish Dhawan Space Centre

The ISRO Pad Abort Test was a launch escape system test by ISRO of its crew module as part of Indian Human Spaceflight Programme. The successful test took place on 5 July 2018.

A Pad Abort Test is a trial run for the spacecraft's launch abort system (sometimes called a launch escape system). This system is designed to quickly get the crew and spacecraft away from the rocket in the event of a potential failure. It is similar to an ejection seat for a fighter pilot, but instead of ejecting the pilot out of the spacecraft, the entire spacecraft is "ejected" away from the launch vehicle. The technology developed is expected to be applied to the first Indian crewed spacecraft called Gaganyaan, scheduled to be launched no earlier than 2024.

== Flight ==
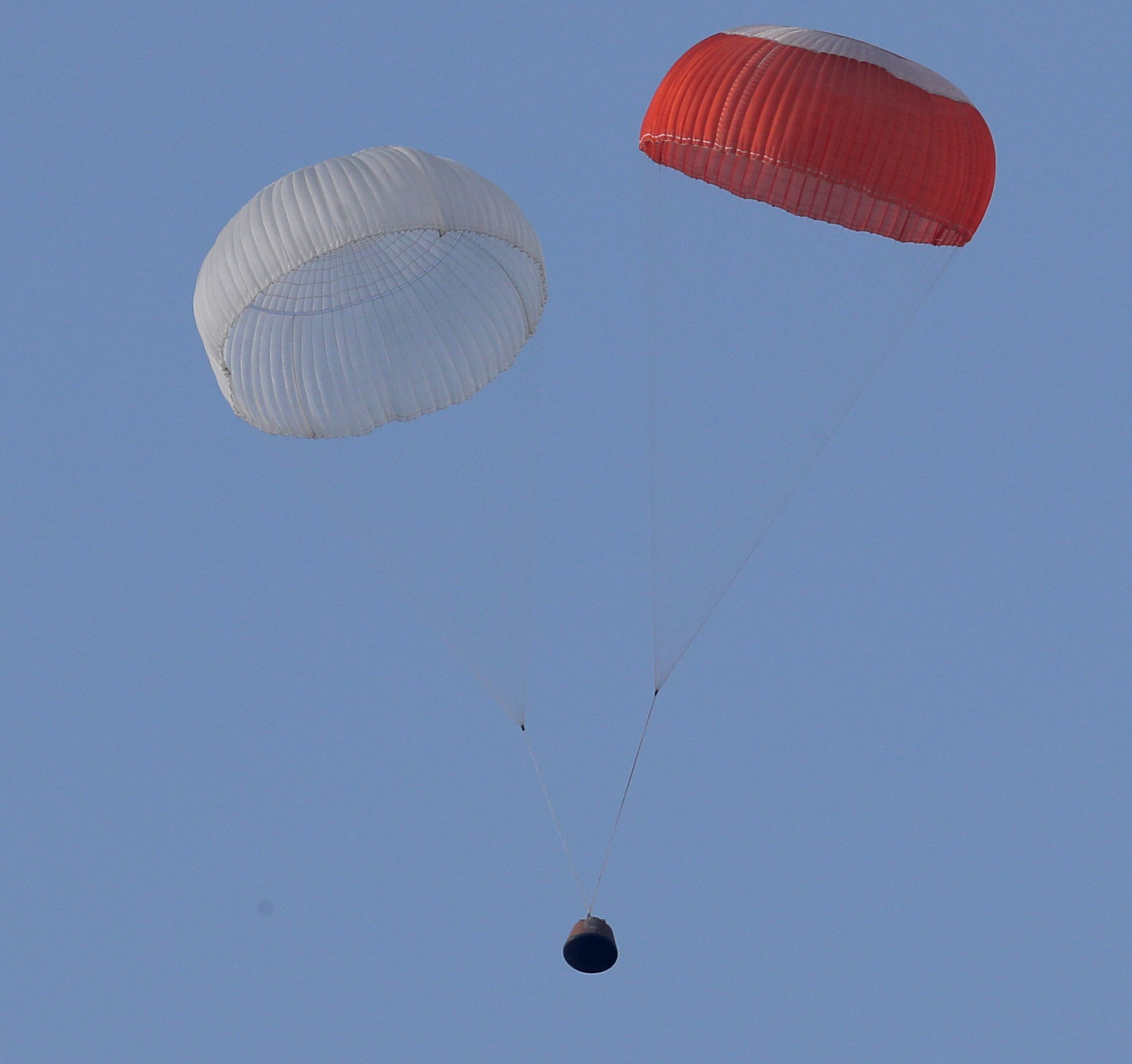
The Gaganyaan Crew Module boilerplate, after jettisoning the Crew Escape System (CES), floats back to the ground under its parachutes over the Bay of Bengal, about 2.9 km from the Satish Dhawan Space Centre, Sriharikota.

The countdown for the test started at 2:00 am (IST) on 5 July 2018. At 7:00 am (IST) The Crew Escape System with crew module successfully lifted-off from Satish Dhawan Space Centre. The crew module was accelerated to 10 g and reached a highest altitude of 2.75 km (1.71 mi), it later safely parachuted down and floated in the Bay of Bengal 2.9 km (1.80 mi) away from its launch site. It was carried skyward using seven solid-fueled rocket motors keeping within the safe g-force limits. Later recovery boats were sent to recover the crew module. The total duration of the test mission was 259 seconds. The test launch process was recorded by around 300 sensors. Main objectives of test were nominal 20 second ascent and 200 seconds of descent, not including the splashdown. Chute detachment was a scheduled event occurring around 259.4 seconds after launch as intended.

Sequence of flight events.
Time	Event
T0 - 30 minutes	Grid fins deployed
T0 - 8 seconds	Separation from launchpad
T0	Ignition of High Altitude Escape Motor (HEM) and Low Altitude Escape Motor (LEM)
T0 + 0.9 seconds	Ignition of Pitch Motor (PM)
T0 + 2 seconds	Burnout of Pitch Motor (PM)
T0 + 5 seconds	Burnout of High Altitude Escape Motor (HEM)
T0 + 8 seconds	Burnout of Low Altitude Escape Motor (LEM)
T0 + 18 seconds	Crew Escape System/Crew Module aft link separation
T0 + 20 seconds	Crew Escape System/Crew Module separation, jettisoning motor ignition
T0 + 29 seconds	Parachute deployment
T0 + 265 seconds	Crew Module Splashdown.

== See also ==
- Gaganyaan, India's crewed spacecraft
- Indian Human Spaceflight Programme
- Launch escape system
