= Paratrooper Training School =

Indian Army training school

PTS (Paratroopers Training School) is a school in Agra, Uttar Pradesh for the training of paratroopers in the Indian Army. PTS was founded in Agra in 1948.

== History ==
In October, 1941, the 50th Indian Parachute Brigade was formed at Delhi. At the same time, the Air Landing School, the predecessor to PTS, was established at Willingdon Airport in New Delhi. Lt AG Rangaraj, IMS and Havaldar Major Mathura Singh of 152 (Indian) Parachute Battalion became the first Indians to be trained and jump.

In 1942, the Air Landing School was renamed No 3 PTS, AF and moved to Chaklala in what is today Pakistan. In 1944 Dakota, Valencia Hudson Wellington and Halifax aircraft were used to transport the paratroopers.

The Partition of India led to the Indian element of PJIs under Sqn Ldr TS Gopalan moving to Agra and the creation of the current school facility.

Air Vice Marshal DK Dhingra(VM) (from Indian Air Force) and Major JCM Rao (from Indian Army) were India's first skydivers. They were sent in 1970 to Ft Bragg, NC and Ft Benning, GA in USA to complete Freefall Jump Masters course, post which AVM Dhingra returned to India and started military combat freefall training at PTS, Agra.

== Awards ==
AVM DK Dhingra was awarded Vayu Sena Medal(VM) for planning airborne assault operations over Bangladesh during 1971 war (Tangail drop) [Citation- https://www.bharat-rakshak.com/indianairforce/database/7563].

Sqn Ldr M Vanian and Flt Lt P Venugopal of PTS have awarded Shaurya Chakra.
