= Space Capsule Recovery Experiment II =

2007 Indian re-entry demonstration mission

SRE-2
- Aero Thermo Structure of SRE-2
- Names: Space Capsule Recovery Experiment II
- Mission type: Re-entry Demonstrator
- Operator: ISRO
- Mission duration: Expected: 10 days

Spacecraft properties
- Launch mass: 550 kg (1,210 lb)

Start of mission
- Launch date: Not launched
- Rocket: PSLV

The Space Capsule Recovery Experiment II (commonly known as SRE-2) was an Indian re-entry demonstration experiment designed by the Indian Space Research Organisation (ISRO). It was a follow-on mission of SRE-1 which was successfully completed in January 2007. It was supposed to test some of the critical technologies for the Indian human spaceflight programme. The second mission was to carry three experiments devoted to biological science and an improved isothermal furnace with 1000 °C temperature to carry out materials science experiments. As of August 2016, SRE-2 is not mentioned in the ISRO official page.

Comptroller and Auditor General of India released a report titled "Inordinate delay in realisation of SRE-2 mission" in 2014.

Outcome Budget 2016-17 of Department of Space mentions that development of space grade color camera and image storage unit for SRE-2 would be undertaken during year 2016–17.

On 4 January 2018, SRE-2 project was declared to be cancelled.

== Objectives ==
The main objective of SRE-2 was to realise a fully recoverable capsule and provide a platform to conduct microgravity experiments on Microbiology, Agriculture, Powder Metallurgy etc.

== Design ==
SRE-2 capsule would have four major pieces of hardware:

- Aero Thermo Structure (ATS)
- Spacecraft platform
- Deceleration and flotation system
- Microgravity payloads

New systems developed for SRE-2 included Carbon-Carbon Nosecone, Indigenous Beacons, etc.

== Payloads ==
The SRE-2 was to carry three experiments devoted to biological science and an improved isothermal furnace with 1000 °C temperature to carry out materials science experiments.

- The first experiment “Biological effects of Microgravity: A genomic and proteomics approach” is being developed in collaboration with CCMB, Hyderabad and a biorack is being developed to enable this experiment. In this experiment, a colony of E. coli bacteria will be grown in microgravity condition and brought back to earth to carry out genomic and proteomic studies. Comparison of these with that obtained during bench mark ground experiments will enable us to identify the genes whose expression is affected by the microgravity. This experiment is designed to explore why microgravity alters some of the growth behaviour of the biological system.
- A second experiment will carry a joint biological payload between JAXA, and Indian Scientists at ISRO and CCMB. The payload is being developed by JAXA with close interaction with ISRO engineers. The experiment will carry cynobacteria which will be cultured under microgravity condition. The aim is to study the effect of microgravity on the photosynthetic ability of these bacteria.
- The third experiment will carry seeds of rice and medicinal plants that will be exposed both to microgravity and space radiation. A dosimeter will measure the amount of radiation. The exposed seeds will be planted on return and the growth of these plants will be compared with the plants of the unexposed seeds to evaluate the effect of microgravity and space radiation.

The materials science experiments will be carried out in the modified isothermal furnace. The main experiment by scientists at IIT Kanpur, is designed to study the effect of gravity on the liquid phase sintering behaviour of the powders. A model copper tin alloy will be studied to explore the basic nature of the sintering process which has important implication in powder metallurgy.

== See also ==
- SRE-1
- Indian human spaceflight programme
- Atmospheric Reentry Demonstrator (ARD was a suborbital reentry test vehicle built by Aérospatiale of France for the European Space Agency and flown on the third Ariane 5 flight on October 21, 1998)

== Sources ==
- The SRE-2 Mission
- Indian human space capsule
