= Food regimes =

Broadly Marxist approach to theorising food systems

Food regime theory is a broadly Marxist approach to theorising food systems. It was developed in the late 1980s by Harriet Friedmann and Philip McMichael. Food regime analysis is concerned with explaining, and therefore politicising, the strategic role of agriculture in the construction and development of the world capitalist economy. As a framework, it takes a historical view in order to identify stable periods of capital accumulation associated with particular configurations of geopolitical power and forms of agricultural production and consumption. Its theoretical roots are in French Regulation Theory and World Systems Theory.

With its Marxist influences, food regime theorists are also interested in how moments of crisis within a particular configuration are expressive of the dialectical tension that animates movement between such configurations (i.e. periods of transition). According to leading food regime proponent Philip McMichael, then, food regimes are always characterised by contradictory forces. Further, consolidation of a regime does not so much resolve as it does contain, or else strategically accommodate, these tensions; meanwhile, their intensification, often via the mobilisations of social movements, tends to signal a period of transition.

== Response and criticism ==
Some academics have claimed that the food regime theory is very limited in its ability to describe all food security issues. A key problem with the theory is that it does not look at localized issues for individual countries, but rather tries to group all the world into a broad grouping. Recent studies has been investigating how countries like Brazil are striving to influence the ongoing shifts of the global food regime.

== Key texts ==
The seminal texts are as follows:

- Harriet Friedmann's (1987) "International regimes of food and agriculture since 1870"
- Friedmann and McMichael's (1989) "Agriculture and the state system: the rise and fall of national agricultures, 1870 to the present"

Further, Philip McMichael's more recent article (2009), "A food regime genealogy", provides a comprehensive overview of the development of the concept, key themes and debates, and a guide to further reading.
