= Aerial Delivery Research and Development Establishment =

Indian defense laboratory

- Field of research: Aerial Delivery Systems
- Director: Dr Manoj Kumar
- Location: Agra, Uttar Pradesh
- Operating agency: Defence Research and Development Organisation

The Aerial Delivery Research and Development Establishment (ADRDE) is a laboratory of the Indian Defence Research and Development Organisation (DRDO). It is located in Agra, Uttar Pradesh in India. Its research scope includes development of systems for dropping heavy loads, brake parachutes, towed targets, aircraft arrester barriers and aerostats.

== Projects ==
Significant projects undertaken by ADRDE during the last two decades include:

- Armament delivery parachutes
- Space recovery parachutes
- Balloon barrage and surveillance systems
- Airships and related applications.

The projects enter the production at Ordnance Factory Kanpur. ADRDE was involved in the design and development of a recovery parachute for the Nishant Unmanned Aerial Vehicle. The organisation developed brake parachutes for LCA Tejas and parachutes for the space capsule of Re-entry experiment SRE-1 by ISRO. Akashdeep, a 2000 cu. m aerostat, was successfully test-flown with actual and dummy payloads.

ADRDE developed the Controlled Aerial Delivery System to deliver payloads through ram-air parachutes at designated coordinates via an on-board electronics unit. This accomplishment is considered one of the unit's major achievements.

The ADRDE conducted the maiden flight trials of the Stratospheric Airship Platform from Sheopur Trial site, Madhya Pradesh on 3 May 2025. It carried instrumental payloads to an altitude of around 17 km (56,000 ft) during the 62-minute long trial. The system will be used for roles including Intelligence, Surveillance & Reconnaissance, ELINT, telecommunication and remote sensing by the Indian Air Force. The procurement of Air-Ship Based High Altitude Pseudo Satellite (AS-HAPS) was granted the Acceptance of Necessity by the Defence Acquisition Council (DAC) under the Indian defence ministry on 12 February 2025.

=== Aerial Delivery System ===
CADS-500 dropped from Antonov An-32.

==== CADS-500 ====
ADRDE on 18 December 2021, successfully completed demonstration flight of controlled aerial delivery system from Antonov An-32 that can deliver 500 kg payload with an accuracy of less 100 m CEP within the targeted area using high performance Ram-air parachute. The system utilizes GPS and NavIC for satellite guidance, attitude and heading reference system and an onboard computing system that helps in autonomous trajectory correction using waypoint navigation. CADS-500 can be dropped from 7,600 m above mean sea level and can cover a distance of 30 km.

=== Military Combat Parachute System ===
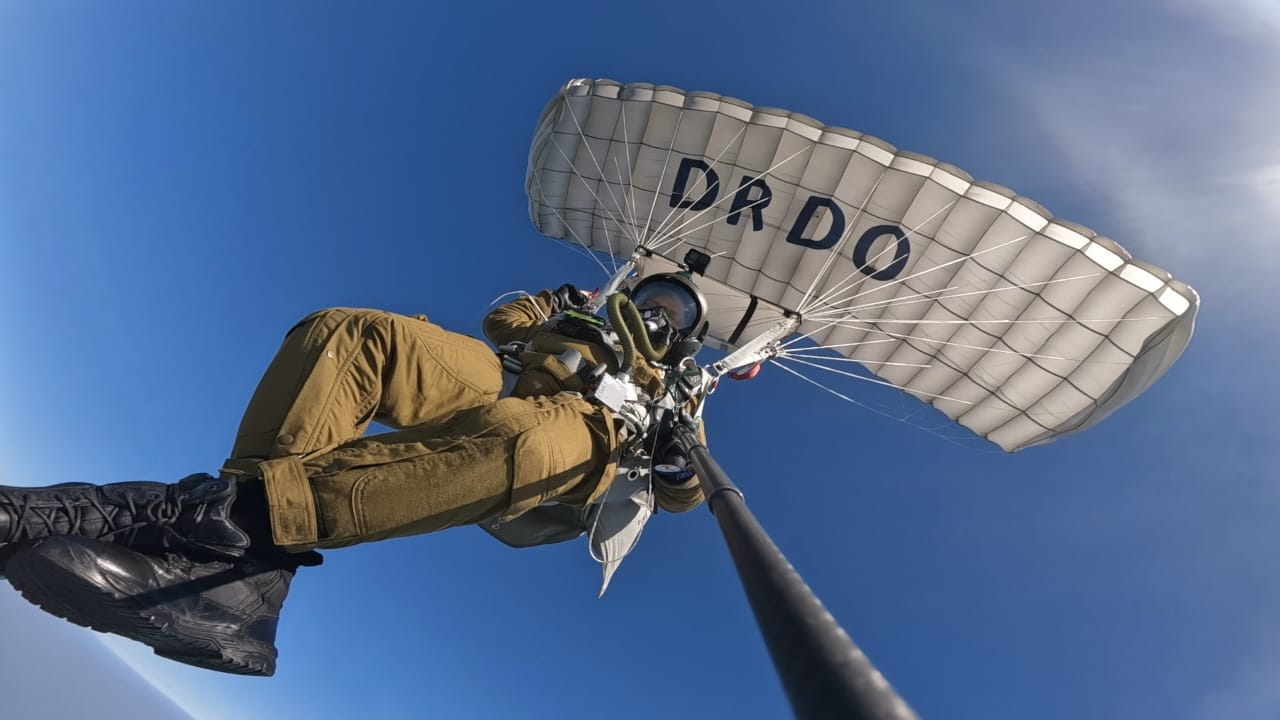
IAF testing MCPS by doing a military free-fall from an altitude of 32,000 feet.

Developed in-house by ADRDE in partnership with the Defence Bioengineering and Electromedical Laboratory, MCPS has successfully completed a military free-fall from 32,000 feet (9,800 m) in October 2025. The test jumpers from Indian Air Force performed the jump, demonstrating its effectiveness, dependability, and sophisticated design. As of now, it is the only parachute system in the Indian Armed Forces that can be deployed above 25,000 feet (7,600 m). With the help of MCPS's enhanced steering capabilities and reduced rate of fall, paratroopers can safely exit airplanes, drop parachutes at pre-established altitudes, navigate precisely, and land in approved zones. The system is not vulnerable to interference or denial of service from foreign entities or countries, and it is compatible with NavIC for guidance, which offers freedom of usage against any adversary. Compared to imports, it offers the shortest turnaround time for routine maintenance and repairs.

To meet the vital tactical needs of airborne forces, the MCPS enables High Altitude High Opening (HAHO), High Altitude Medium Opening (HAMO), and High Altitude Low Opening (HALO) jumps. A complete combat load, including guns, ammunition, and a survival pack, can be carried by the system. The MCPS was certified by the Centre for Military Airworthiness and Certification and completed more than 350 trials with the Paratrooper Training School before being put into service in 2023. MCPS improves operational preparedness by enabling the quick and accurate deployment of special forces into challenging or dangerous terrain.
