= Murali =

Murali may refer to:

== People ==
=== Mononyms ===
- Murali (Malayalam actor) (1954–2009), name of Malayalam film actor Muraleedharan Pillai, who appeared in Neythukaran and Aadhaaram
- Murali (Tamil actor) (1964–2010), Tamil actor who appeared in films such as Pagal Nilavu and Vetri Kodi Kattu
- Sriimurali, Kannada actor previously credited as Murali
- Karthik (actor) (1960–), Tamil actor who is credited in Telugu as Murali

=== Given name ===
- Murali Chemuturi (born 1950), Indian software development expert
- Murali Coryell (born 1969), American blues guitarist and singer
- Murali Gopy (born 1972), Indian screenwriter, actor, author, singer, and journalist
- Murali Kartik (born 1976), Indian cricketer
- Murali Krishna (disambiguation)
  - Murali Krishna (director), Indian film director
- Murali Kumar Gavit (born 1997), Indian long-distance runner
- Murali Kuttan (1953–2010), Indian track and field athlete
- Murali Mohan (born 1940), Indian film actor, producer, politician and business executive
- Murali Nair (born 1966), Indian director and screenwriter
- Murali Perunelly (born 1950), politician
- Murali Pillai (born 1967), Singaporean politician
- Murali Sastry (born 1959), Indian scientist
- Murali Sharma, Indian character actor
- Murali K. Thalluri (born 1984), Australian film director, writer, and producer
- Murali Vijay (born 1984), Indian cricketer

=== Surname ===
- Anil Murali, Indian film actor
- B. Murali (born 1971), Malayalam author
- Bala Murali (born 1969), Indian cricket umpire
- Chithrakaran Murali, artist from Kerala
- D. K. Murali, politician
- Kadambari Murali (born 1975), sports journalist
- Karthikeyan Murali (born 1999), Indian chess player
- Kaviyoor Murali (1931–2001), dalit activist and researcher
- Khushi Murali (1963–2013), Indian playback singer
- Mithun Murali (born 1992), Indian actor
- Mrudula Murali (born 1990), Indian film actress, model, anchor, and classical dancer
- Muttiah Muralitharan (born 1972), often referred to as "Murali", Sri Lankan cricketer
- N. Murali (born 1946), publisher of the Hindu Group
- Posani Krishna Murali (born 1958), Indian screenwriter, actor, director, and producer
- Ramisetti Murali (born 1963), Indian social worker and activist
- Sabesh–Murali, Indian musical duo
- Suchitra Murali, Indian actress
- U. K. Murali, Indian singer and music composer

== Places ==
- Murali, Arsky District, Republic of Tatarstan
- Murali, Kaybitsky District, Republic of Tatarstan

== Other ==
- Murali, another name for Bansuri, the flute played by Lord Krishna
- Murali, another name for the matrimony vine, Lycium barbarum
