= Techfest =

Technical festival of IIT Bombay

Techfest, IIT Bombay
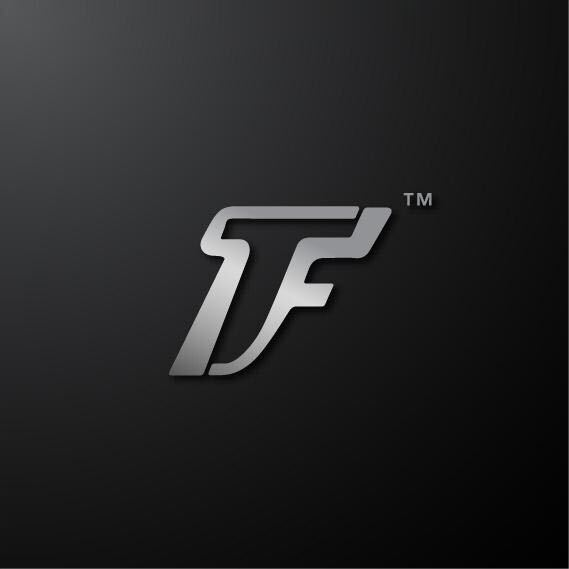
- Status: Active
- Genre: Non-Profit Student Organisation
- Date: 22–24 December 2025
- Frequency: Annually
- Venue: IIT, Bombay
- Locations: Mumbai, India
- Coordinates: 19°08′01.09″N 72°54′55.29″E
- Country: India
- Years active: 29 years
- Patrons: UNICEF, UNESCO, Centre for environment education(CEE) and South Asia Youth Environment Network(SAYEN)
- Organiser: Student community of IIT Bombay
- Website: www.techfest.org Techfest on X

Techfest, Asia's largest science and technology festival, is the annual science and technology festival of the Indian Institute of Technology Bombay, consisting of social initiatives and outreach programs throughout the year.

Started in 1998 with the aim of providing a platform for the Indian student community to develop and showcase their projects, with a footfall of 1.8 lakhs in its latest edition. The activities culminate in a large three-day event on the campus of IIT Bombay which attracts people from all over the world, including students, academics, and other members of the general public.

== History and growth ==
Techfest 1998 marked the inception of Techfest, the annual science and technology festival of IIT Bombay. It set the broad outlines of the festival with competitions, lecture series, workshops, and exhibitions, which have since become its core features. Entrepreneurship also made appearances in the 1999 and 2000 editions. The entertainment segment, called Technoholix, debuted during these years and featured technological shows and on-the-spot activities.

Techfest 2001–2002 saw the inclusion of department-based events like Yantriki, Chemsplash and Last Straw. Students from G H Raisoni College of Engineering received the Engineering Excellence Award for best design. The award-winning team included Mr. Amit Shankar Choudhary, Mr. Fahad Azad, and Mr. Bodhisatta Ganguly from GHRCE, Nagpur.

Techfest 2002–2003 launched the Techfest Trophy to increase competition engagement. Colleges from across India participated to win the coveted trophy.

Techfest 2003–2004 marked a milestone with the introduction of the International Machine Design Contest – Cliffhanger. It also saw India’s first hosting of the robotics competition Micromouse. Teams from Nepal, Sri Lanka, and Singapore took part.

Techfest 2004–2005 introduced problem-based competitions like Survivor and social-impact projects like Drishti, in association with the National Association for the Blind.

Techfest 2006 shifted focus from pure engineering to applied technology. The new segment E-Rustique had problem statements aiming at rural innovation.

Techfest 2006–2007 introduced Nexus, a workshop-plus-competition module that took robotics to cities beyond Mumbai.

Techfest 2007–2008 expanded Nexus to 7 cities: Indore, Calicut, Jaipur, New Delhi, Pune, Surat, and Mumbai. It also launched a campaign on global warming.

Techfest 2008–2009 introduced iNexus, expanding Nexus internationally to Sri Lanka, UAE, and Denmark. The finalists from these countries were flown to India. Prayaas, an open innovation platform, was also introduced.

Techfest 2009–2010 introduced Scintillations, a segment of night exhibitions and shows. Exhibitors included ISRO, Indian Navy, and NDMA.

Techfest 2010–2011 added Crossroads, a street entertainment zone. Events included street magic and stunt shows. Technoholix featured the world’s best Double Dutch crew, and lectures included Harold Kroto and Richard Stallman.

Techfest 2011–2012 featured the Indo-Pak peace initiative Ummeed-e-Milaap. WAVE-India promoted electric vehicle awareness through a 2500+ km road trip. Lecturers included Venki Ramakrishnan and Karlheinz Brandenburg. Exhibits included Nao Robot and Crazy File.

Techfest 2012–2013 was graced by Amartya Sen, Ei-ichi Negishi, and Rakesh Sharma. The International Robotics Challenge saw participation from 8 countries. TechOlympics was launched. Initiatives like Green Campus Challenge (750 colleges) and Give-A-Coin were widely appreciated.

Techfest 2013–2014 saw a record participation of 1.35 lakh. The lecture series included C.N.R. Rao, Pranav Mistry, and Kiran Bedi. Technoholix premiered a 3D projection play. The anti-smoking campaign I SMOKE entered the Limca Book of Records. Reliance Jio launched 4G services at Techfest.

Techfest 2014–2015 had a footfall of 1.45 lakh and lectures by A.P.J. Abdul Kalam, Bjarne Stroustrup, and Vint Cerf. Initiatives were nominated for the TOI Social Impact Awards. Campaigns included Smart City Challenge and ASK, promoting the RTI Act.

Techfest 2015–2016 recorded the highest footfall of 1.65 lakh. Notable speakers were Serge Haroche, Eric Klinker, and K. Radhakrishnan. New campaigns included Recycle, promoting fitness and environment, and Internet for All, for digital literacy in partnership with NIELIT.

Techfest 2016–2017, themed "A Space Expedition", featured Rakesh Sharma, Bruce Allen, and Mark Papermaster. It hosted World MUN with 525 delegates. Social initiatives included CURED? (diabetes awareness), Save The Souls (animal testing petition), and IAmPower (girls in STEM).

Techfest 2017–2018 had the theme "Digitalization, Sustainability and Biotechnology", with 1.75 lakh participants. Highlights included Sophia the robot and lectures by Tanmay Bakshi, Manohar Parrikar, and Jayanth Sinha. Initiatives included SHE (menstrual health) and Nirbhaya (women’s self-defence workshops).

Techfest 2018–2019 followed the theme "A Timeless Lapse". The 14th Dalai Lama and Simon Taufel delivered lectures. Under the Student Solar Ambassador Program, 1.25 lakh students built solar lamps. A Guinness World Record was set for most LED lights lit. SPEAK promoted mental health awareness.

Techfest 2019–2020, themed "Da Vincian Spectacle", merged art and science. Notable speakers included Zaheer Khan, Vidya Balan, Narayan Murthy, and Tshering Tobgay. Campaigns included IUnderstand (financial literacy) and BOLT (bone health awareness).

Techfest 2020–2021 was themed "An Elysian Singularity" and held fully online due to the COVID-19 pandemic. Speakers included the Dalai Lama, Malcolm Turnbull, Rana Daggubati, and Andrew Ng. Initiatives included HOPE (mental health), WeCare (animal welfare), and Virtual Industry Visits.

Techfest 2021–2022 marked the 25th edition with the theme "The Multiversal Escapade". Eminent guests included Kevin Rudd, Ehud Olmert, Scott Belsky, and Takaaki Kajita. New initiatives included Nidaan (breast cancer awareness), Saksham (for disabled), and Drishti (eye donation awareness).

Techfest 2022–2023 had the theme "The Submerged Sojourn". Eminent personalities such as Tarja Halonen, Kathryn Leuders, Suresh Prabhu and Lars Rasmussen attended. Highlights included India's first-ever consumer 5G test by Jio, a Drone Light Show, and the launch of the Drone Racing League.

Techfest 2023–24 had the theme "The Mystical Realm" and welcomed distinguished guests including S. Somanath, Akash Ambani, Taro Kono, and Dr. G. Satheesh Reddy. The edition was marked by a gripping Defense Symposium that put the L-70 Gun and DRDO's DAKSH MINI on public display, alongside thrilling international drone racing. It also made history as the venue for India's debut 360-degree EDM night.

Techfest 2024–25 had the theme "Sustainnovative Sentience" and drew luminaries such as Dr. Justice D.Y. Chandrachud, N.V. Ramana, Jeet Adani, and Jay Kotak. The festival made headlines with India's first-ever showcase of the Unitree G1 humanoid robot and delighted crowds with Japan's Robo DJ. International Robowars returned with full force, and a high-profile defense symposium brought together India's top military chiefs on a single stage.

Techfest 2025–26 had the theme "A Simulated Paradigm" and featured an exceptional lineup including Shri Nitin Gadkari, N.R. Narayana Murthy, General Anil Chauhan, and Dr. V. Narayanan. Its centerpiece was India's first-ever Space Symposium, where the Gaganyaan astronauts made a landmark appearance. The debut Global Humanoid Conclave spotlighted the Unitree G1 robot, international Robowars thrilled audiences once again, and an official Pokémon Fiesta Pop-up rounded out the edition.

== Patronages, awards and recognitions ==
Techfest is among the very few student organizations to have received patronage from United Nations organisations. Among its various recognitions, prominent ones are listed below:

- UNESCO for promotion of technical knowledge
- UNICEF for the social causes taken up through Ideate competitions and other initiatives over the years
- Centre for environment education("CEE") and (SAYEN) for its approach and initiatives towards environment change
- Techfest has also been nominated for the Times of India "Social Impact Award 2015" for its unique social campaigns in the field of child education, women empowerment, encouraging Indo-Pak relations and creating awareness
- Techfest, IIT Bombay in association with SoULS, IIT Bombay created a Guinness World Record for the "most LED lights lit simultaneously" on 2 October 2018

== Structure and organisation ==
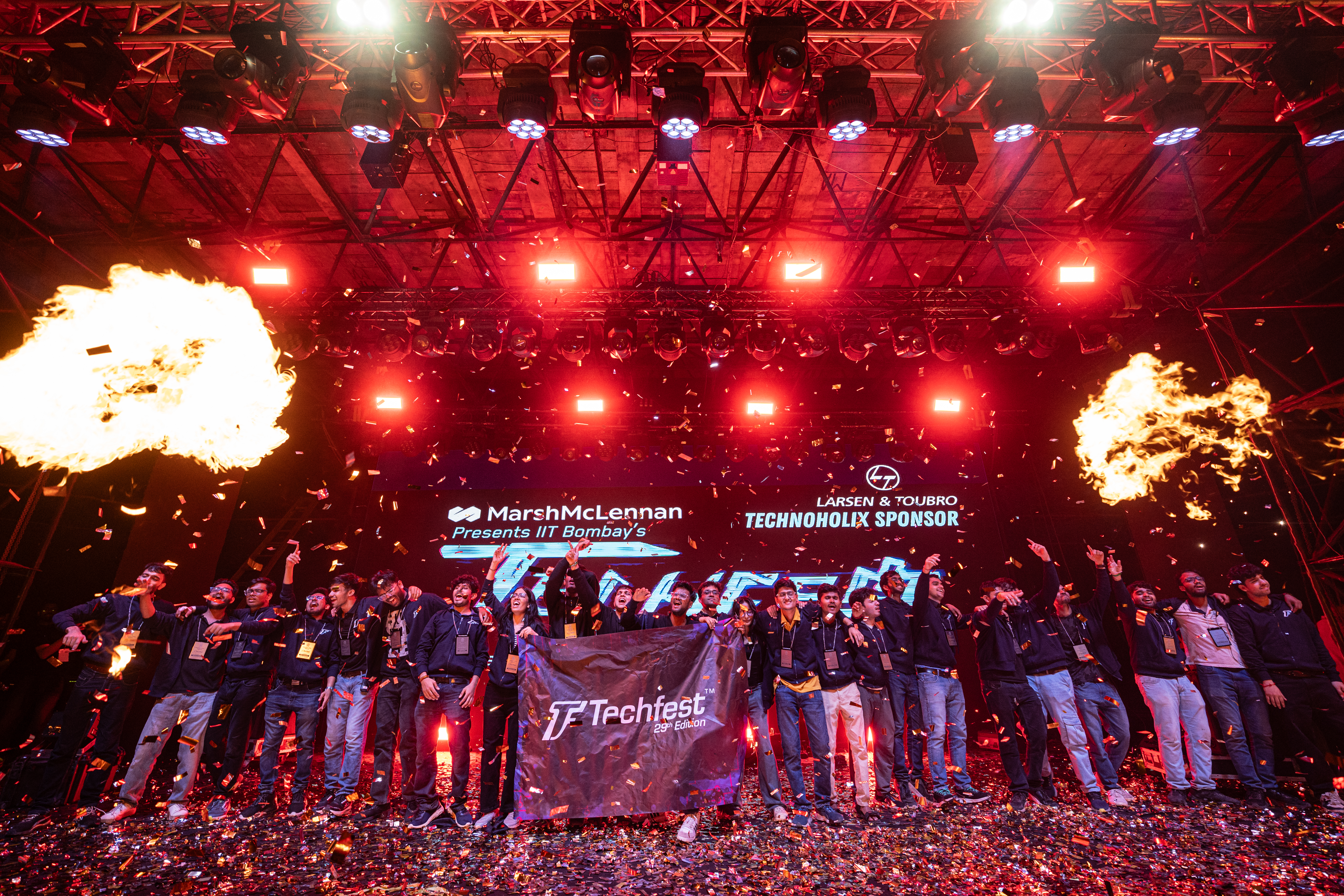
Team Techfest 2025-26

Techfest is an entirely student-organized body. The core committee has 24 members: two Overall Coordinators at the helm and 22 managers who overlook all the aspects and activities of Techfest. Each Manager has a portfolio assigned to them which can be broadly categorized into two sections - administration and events. The administrative portfolios primarily include tasks like accounts, infrastructure, marketing, hospitality, publicity and media along with helping with the events. The events portfolios include responsibility for each of the numerous happenings and initiatives are taken by Techfest each year. A team of over 800 Coordinators and Organizers along with 2500+ College ambassadors works in sync with the managers to execute and implement the activities of the festival. Each manager has their own team of coordinators and organisers, who together take care of every little detail of the department and ensure that the ideas of the team are executed smoothly.

== Events ==
=== Lectures ===
In the Lecture Series, notable guest speakers share their ideas, experiences, insights, and life learnings on the grounds of IIT Bombay. There have been speakers and participants from over 20 countries. Over 200 lectures have been held.

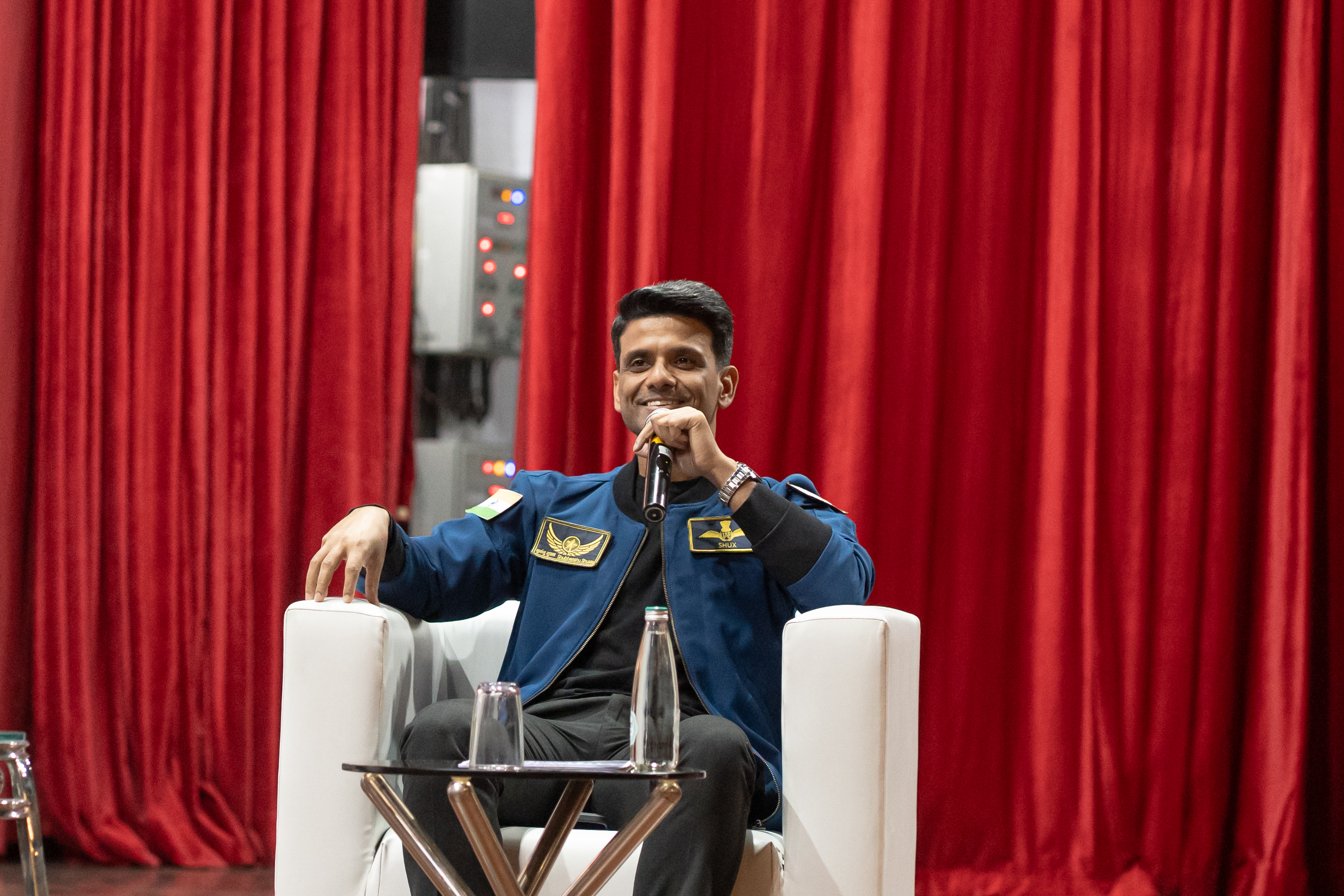
Gp Capt. Shubhansu Shukla in a Panel Discussion

The past speakers at Techfest have included the following:

- The 14th Dalai Lama (Nobel Laureate, Peace)
- APJ Abdul Kalam (former President of India)
- Amartya Sen (Nobel Laureate, Economics)
- Ada Yonath (Nobel Laureate, Chemistry)
- Serge Haroche (Nobel Laureate, Physics)
- Leland H. Hartwell (Nobel Laureate, Physiology or Medicine)
- Vint Cerf (father of the Internet)
- Bjarne Stroustrup (inventor of C++)
- Tarja Halonen (first woman President of Finland)
- Lars Rasmussen (co-founder, Google Maps)
- N. R. Narayana Murthy (Founder, Infosys)
- C.N.R. Rao (Bharat Ratna 2013)
- Nitin Gadkari (Union Minister for Road Transport & Highways, India)
- General Anil Chauhan (Chief of Defence Staff, India)
- Dr. K. Radhakrishnan (former Chairman, ISRO)
- Dr. S. Somanath (former Chairman, ISRO)
- Akash Ambani (Chairman, Reliance Jio)
- Jeet Adani (Director, Adani Airports & Adani Digital Labs)
- Eric Klinker (CEO, BitTorrent)
- Gp. Capt. Shubhanshu Shukla (Gaganyaan astronaut; second Indian in space)
- Gp. Capt. Prasanth Balakrishnan Nair (Gaganyaan astronaut)
- Gp. Capt. Angad Pratap (Gaganyaan astronaut)

=== International Exhibitions ===
International Exhibitions is one of the flagship events of Techfest, IIT Bombay, providing attendees with a experience of cutting-edge innovations from across the globe. The exhibition serves as a platform for universities, research institutions, companies, startups, and innovators to showcase advancements in robotics, artificial intelligence, aerospace, automation, defense technology, sustainable engineering, and human - machine interaction. With exhibitors and collaborators from 30+ countries, 380+ international exhibits showcased over the years, participation from 500+ international universities, and an annual footfall exceeding 180K+, the exhibition continues to attract technology enthusiasts, researchers, students, and industry leaders every year.

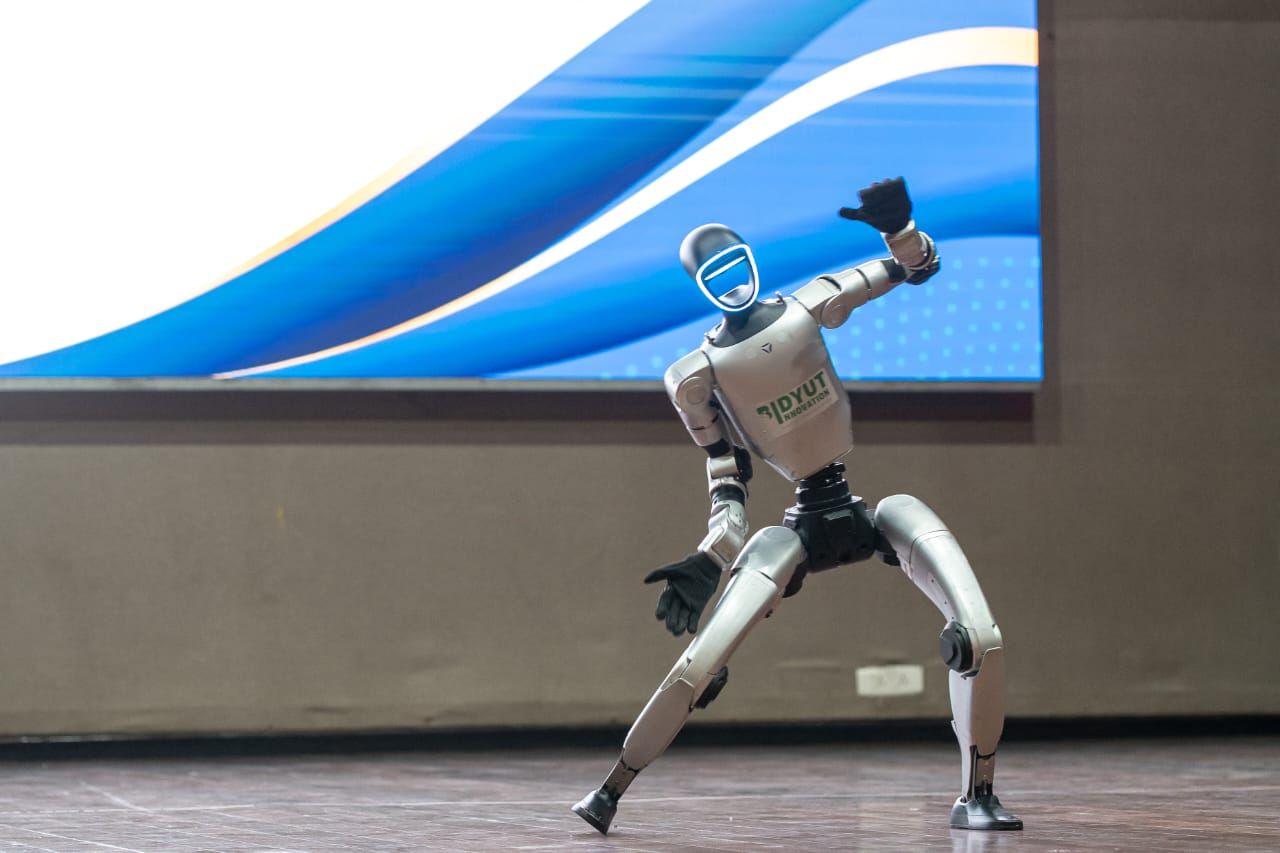
Humanoid Robot at International Exhibitions

The past highlights at Techfest International Exhibitions have included the following:

- Sophia by Hanson Robotics (Social Humanoid Robot, Hong Kong)
- Einstein Robot by Hanson Robotics (Humanoid Einstein Robot, Hong Kong)
- Robothespian (Interactive Humanoid Robot, UK)
- Unitree Robotics (Humanoid Robots, China)
- Booster K1 Robot (Advanced Humanoid Robotics platform)
- Gravity Industries Jet Suit (UK)
- Formula E Gen 2 Race Car (Electric Racing Technology Showcase)
- BrahMos Missile System (India)
- ISRO Exhibits (Indian space technology showcase)

This year, Techfest also conducted the Humanoid Conclave, bringing together leading humanoid robots.

=== Tech Expo ===
During the 29th edition of the festival, held in December 2025, Techfest introduced a specialized "TechExpo" pavilion focusing on early-stage commercial tech ventures and industrial applications. Organized as a dedicated two-day event within the broader festival timeline, the exhibition hosted more than 20 startups, offering them an interactive platform to showcase advancements in enterprise security, full-stack scalability, industrial automation, and specialized professional upskilling. Notable participating startups included Altered Security, Exzone Solutions, The Ambition Factory, Synergics Solutions, Techcanvas, Redesyn, Renaissance, Skills Connect, and Tatvamasi.

=== Competitions ===
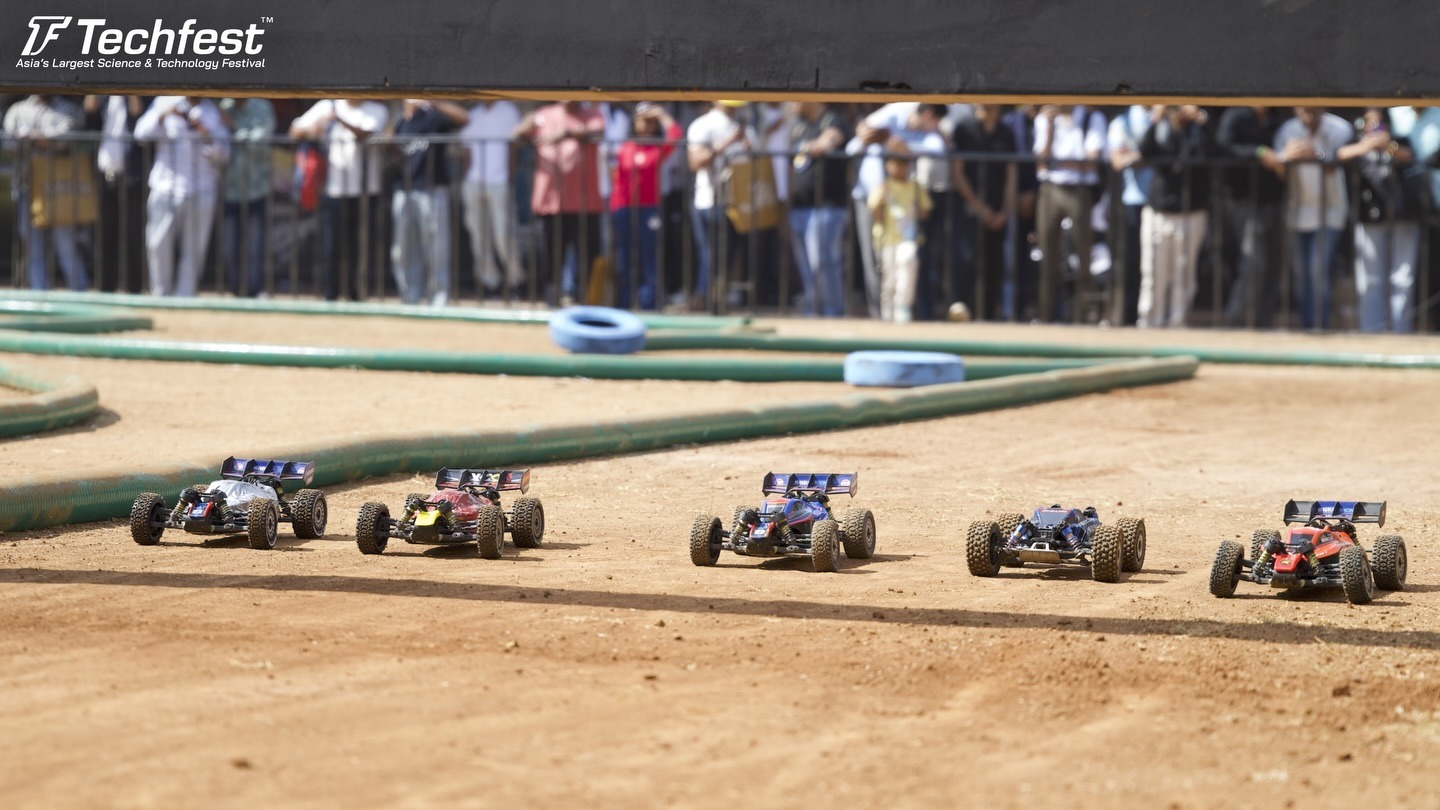
International Full Throttle

Competitions serve is the primary component of Techfest by replaced with supporting its mission to promote Science and Technology. Techfest 2025 Competitions saw a total participation of over 35,000 from various parts of the globe. With participation from more than 20 countries, this segment has evolved to become a streamlined to state facts directly for international exchange. Competitions of Techfest, IIT Bombay, covers various genres under this segment like:

1. Competitive Coding under International Coding Challenge and World Programming Championship
2. Game Development under Game of Codes, Mathematics under National Integration Challenge
3. Aerospace under Drone Challenge and Boeing Aeromodelling Competition
4. Aquatics under Autonomous Underwater Vehicle Challenge (AUV)
5. RC Nitro Buggy Car under International Full Throttle
6. Robotics under Robowars
7. Roboracer
8. Cozmoclench
9. National Challenge
10. Blixathon International Robotics Challenge and International Micromouse Challenge
11. Gaming under E-sports
12. Structural Engineering under Crane-o-Mania
13. Techfest organized a several online competitions for participants around the globe These explored different genres like AI/ML under Datamatics Hackathon, Cashflow Modelling and Hack AI, Software Development under Mernifier and Coddecode, and application-based competitions like Atom-Quest, Dronelog and Certi-Tech. Ideate competitions, namely Urban Futurism, Safetronics, Aarohan, Tech Aid and Task Whiz, which require participants to come up with innovative solutions to real-world problems, were also conducted.

Techfest also organizes competitions for school kids to encourage them to explore the field of science and technology. Competitions like Techfest Olympiads (online as well as offline), and Innovation Challenge were conducted in 2023 which aimed at promoting innovation and creativity in young minds. In the 29th edition of Techfest, 25+ brainstorming competitions were conducted in different modes, focused on solving real-world problems, like TIH-IoT, Playto Competition, and many more.

Furthermore, marking a significant milestone, the algorithmic trading competition - AlgoNinja was conducted for the first time catering to quant enthusiasts across the country featuring cash prize of over 1 Million INR. This three-stage competition, in association with FinDoc, started from the ideation stage where each team presented their strategies and objectives. The competition concluded at Techfest in IIT Bombay, where finalists’ trading algorithms were judged by an expert panel based on their returns, volatility, robustness, and practicality

The International Robotics Challenge (IRC) used to be an international competition, which had participation from over 12 countries. The elimination rounds are held in the respective countries and the finals are held at Techfest. IRC has seen participation from France, Russia, Sweden, South Africa, Egypt, Bangladesh, Ethiopia, India, Nepal, Pakistan, Syria, Sri Lanka and Thailand. Techfest International Coding Challenge also saw participation from different countries.

Drone Racing League went International for the first time in India at Techfest 2023 including participation of Killian Rousseau from France, who had been two-times World Cup champion and 2022 World Games winner. Techfest serves as a platform for inspiring the upcoming generation of pioneers and inventors.

In addition to the list of other competitions, the zonal competitions at Techfest, named Technorion included 14 nationwide zonal centers as Jaipur, Nagpur, Bhopal, Mumbai, Delhi, Bhubaneshwar, Kolkata, Jamshedpur, Gandhinagar, Kanpur, Ropar, Chennai, Bangalore and Hyderabad competing in robotics and coding competitions namely Meshmerize, CoDecode, Cozmo Clench, Sparkx and Techfest Olympiads held especially for school students around the country.

Technorion 2022 went International wherein we had International Technorion in Nepal in association with Advanced Robotics Club - ARC, Nepal, in Madagascar in association with STEM4GOOD Madagascar, and in Bangladesh in association with DUET, Bangladesh.The winners from Nepal, Bangladesh, and Madagascar then represented their nation at Techfest from 16–18 December.

Technorion 2024 was held across four countries namely Madagascar, Turkey, Nepal and Bangladesh. International Robowars Zonals were held for the first time in North America in Mexico in 2024 in association with la Batalla de Robots Recarga2, and two winning teams came to India to participate in the finals at Techfest held from 17th to 19 December.

Technorion 2025 marked another year of global expansion, with International Technorion being held in Nepal and Madagascar, and International Robowars Zonals in Iran in association with Pardis Technology Park. The national winners from each country went on to represent their nations at Techfest from 22nd to 24 December.

=== International Robowars ===
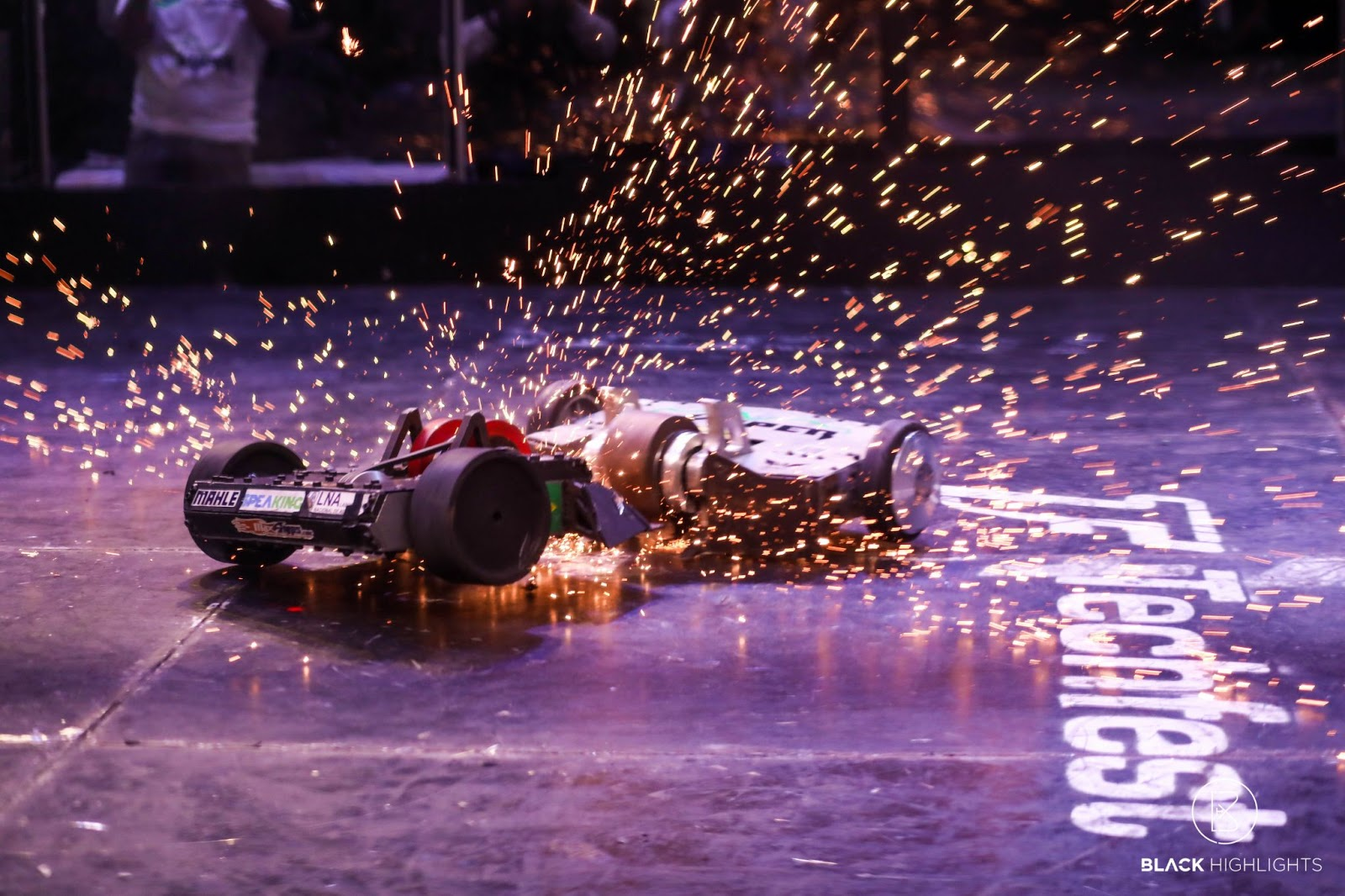
A Robowars duel in progress.

Robowars is the grandest competition in the entire Techfest, a spectacle of sparks, steel, and engineering brilliance that has consistently been one of the biggest crowd-pullers in recent years, drawing an audience of 7500+ in Techfest 2023 alone. In its early years, the competition ran two weight categories, 120 lbs and 30 lbs, but as participation surged and the event's reputation grew, it outgrew its original format entirely. By Techfest 2017-18, the competition had evolved into The International Robowars, a full-fledged global arena where the world's finest combat robots come to battle. The stage has attracted marquee names to its microphone as well, renowned BattleBots announcer Faruq Tauheed brought his electrifying commentary to Techfest 2022, while celebrated Indian model, actor, voice artist, and TV presenter Gagandeep Sayal anchored the following edition. On the arena floor, the competition has only grown fiercer, Techfest saw participation of more than 450 competitors, with Team UARROR, the World No. 1 team at the time, also joining the fray. Weight categories have expanded alongside the ambition of the event, with the 8 kg class introduced in 2019 and the 30 kg category added in 2022. Team Prixx holds the title of current champion in the 60 kg category, while Riobotz of Brazil are the reigning overall champions and BlankaBotz holds the record for the most Robowars titles won an impressive three. With a prize pool of 1.3 million and the distinction of being the first edition of the International Robowars to be broadcast on Jio TV, the competition's profile has never been higher.

The 2024 edition featured more than 50 national teams and more than 10 international teams going to IIT Bombay. The International Zonal Robowars were conducted across five countries as official qualifying rounds, giving the teams a pathway to the finale. Among the milestones was the first zonal event in North America, held in Mexico, a step that signalled the competition's reach beyond Asia. Zonal finalists then went to compete alongside India's teams inside an arena, competing to win in front of a live audience that reached over 15,000 spectators across two days, indicating how Robowars has expanded from the two-category origin.

The 2025 edition, held as part of Techfest's 29th edition from December 22–24, 2025, saw the International Robowars scale new heights of global participation. International teams from Russia, Nepal, and Sri Lanka were among the competitors, with an International Zonal also conducted in Iran for the first time, further expanding the competition's geographic footprint beyond its previous editions. The live audience surpassed 20,000 spectators, reflecting the event’s steadily growing popularity and increasing impact among students, innovators, and technology enthusiasts across the country. This edition also witnessed the addition of a new venue to accommodate the expanding scale of activities and audience engagement, enabling smoother event operations, enhanced visitor experience, and greater capacity for competitions, exhibitions, and interactive sessions, further strengthening the festival’s successful growth trajectory. The 2025 edition was anchored by Bela Camps and Shahbaaz; Bela Camps is a Brazilian robot combat host, competitor, and captain of team Braabots, known internationally for her work in the robot battle circuit. The growing stature of the International Robowars at Techfest has played a significant role in nurturing and expanding the robot combat community in India, inspiring a new generation of student engineers and builders across the country to design, build, and compete at the highest levels of the sport with Indian teams increasingly making their mark not just on home soil but at international combat robotics competitions around the world.

Technoholix

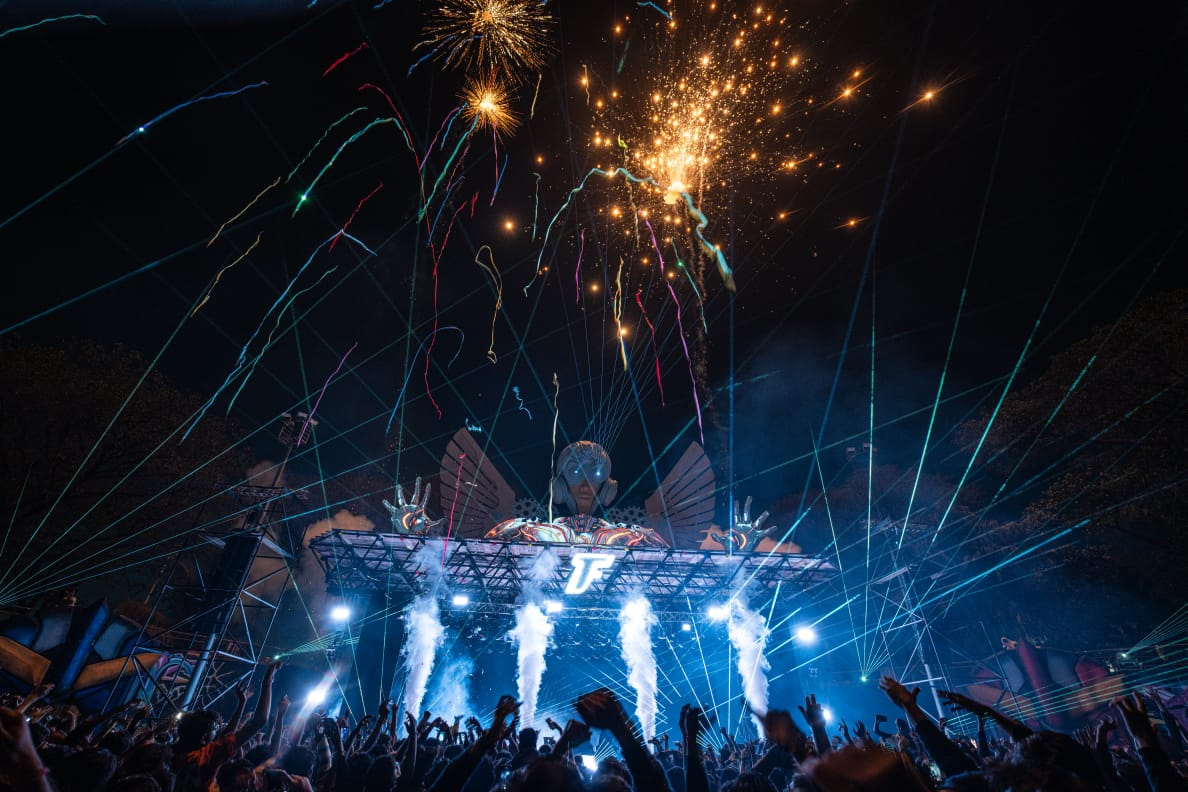
Closing Ceremony of Techfest 25-26

Technoholix is the techno-cultural entertainment segment of Techfest, IIT Bombay. Launched during the 1999–2000 edition, the three-night event has grown into one of Asia's largest student-organized entertainment festivals. It bridges technical innovation and the performing arts by integrating stage technologies such as 3D holographic mapping, synchronized pyrotechnics, laser tracking, and robotics into live performances.

The platform showcases laser artists Gendai and Arius, EDM headliners DJ Marnik, DJ Maddix, Danny Avila, and Matisse & Sadko, alongside spectacles like a 1500+ drone show in collaboration with Pokémon. Additional performances feature Japan's Robo DJ, light-up troupe Light Balance, Spain's bubble artist Whitedream, Italy's laser harpists Giacomo & Diana, and Indian acts Lost Stories, MJ5, and the Illuminati Dance Crew.

=== Ozone ===
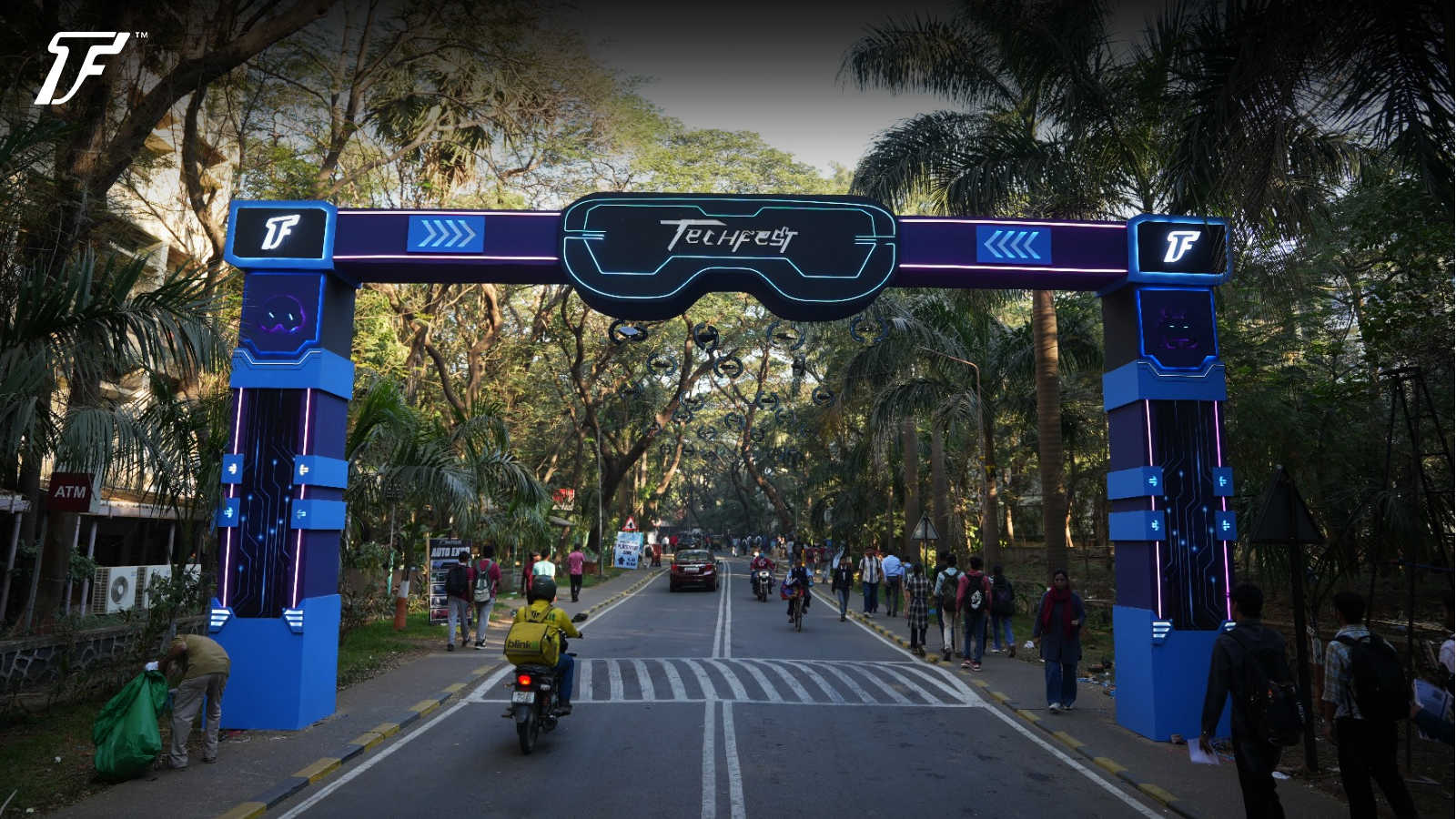
Techfest Main Gate

Ozone or 'On the spot zone' comprises the amusement part of Techfest. It is a place to hang around for exciting games and astounding street performances. Started in 2006, it has proved to be an integral part of Techfest in the past few years. Through Ozone, Techfest has brought in various entertainment-based technical gadgetry for the first time in India, be it Lazer tag (2010), VirtuSphere (2011), Silent Disco (2013), F1 Simulator (2014) or Oculus Rift (2015), Augmented Wall (2017, China), Beat Saber (2018) 9-D simulator, most powerful realism(2019). Events like Junkyard Wars, Paintball, Water Zorbing, 6D-XD Simulator, Flying Simulator, Go Karting, ATV rides and the Gaming Zone help keep the audience engrossed when they are not involved in the grueling competitions and workshops.

Social Initiatives

Alongside its technical and scientific programmes, Techfest, IIT Bombay has spearheaded numerous social outreach initiatives aimed at driving grassroots change across the country.

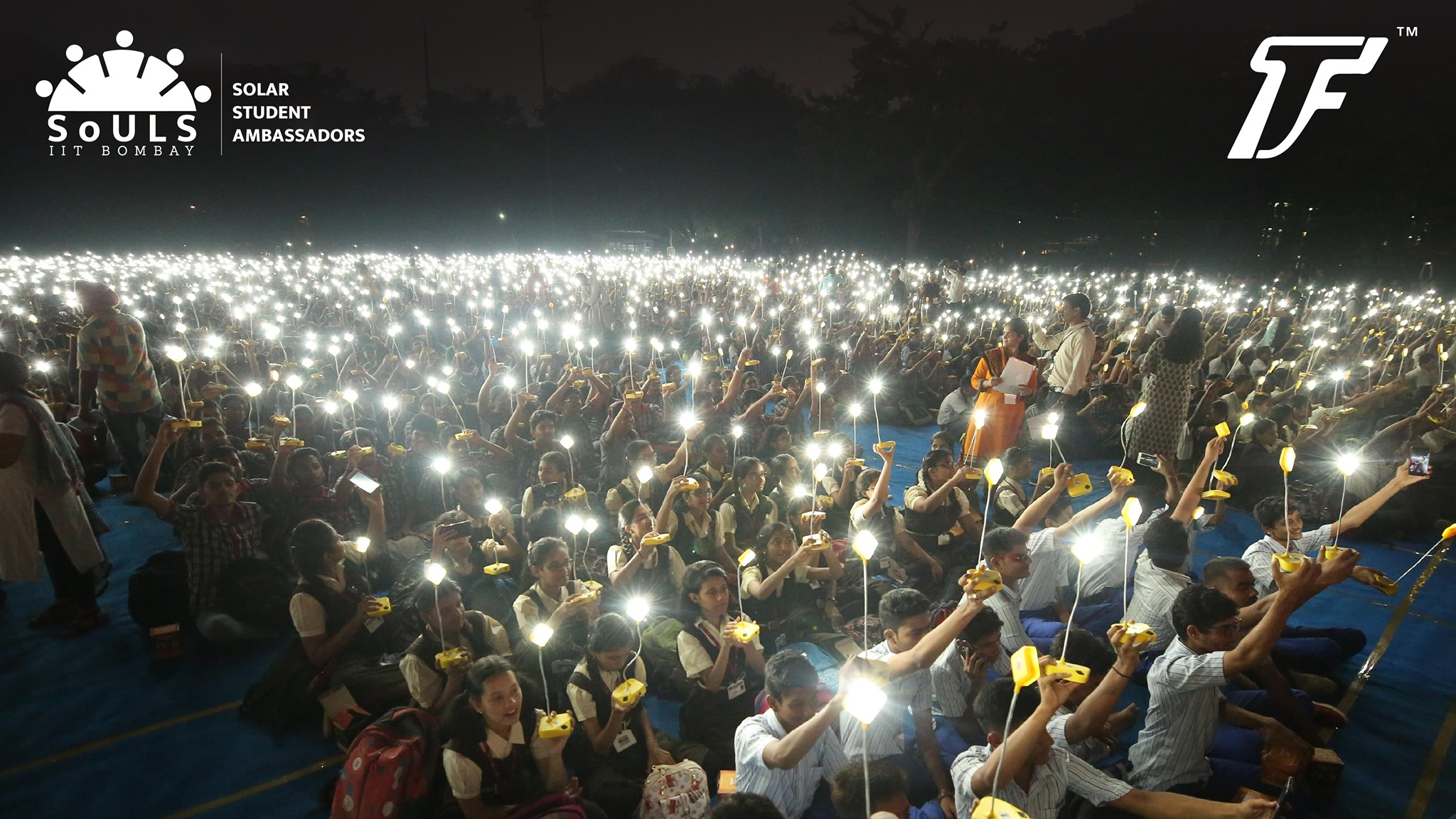
Student Solar Ambassador Program

- SSAP - Student Solar Ambassador Program launched in 2017–18 in partnership with SoULS, IIT Bombay, trained students across all 36 Indian states and union territories to assemble solar lamps. The programme has trained over 1,25,000 students and achieved a Guinness World Record on 2 October 2018 for the most LED lights lit simultaneously.
- SHE - Sanitary Health Education launched in 2016–17 to promote menstrual hygiene among women in rural and semi-urban India. Over 2,00,000 sanitary napkins have been distributed across 25+ villages, with support from celebrities including Sonakshi Sinha and Amrita Rao.
- SPEAK Stand To Express - Mental health initiative launched in 2018–19 to reduce stigma and promote emotional wellbeing among engineering students. Operating under Techfest's UNICEF patronage, it has mentored over 5,000 students across 50+ colleges through year-round workshops via the Campus Ambassador network, with Yami Gautam as the Brand Ambassador for the program.
- Saksham - Launched in 2019–20, for the welfare of differently abled, the initiative promotes the social inclusion of disabled individuals through awareness sessions and NGO partnerships. It has conducted 50+ sessions, partnered with 15 NGOs, and reached approximately 43,000 people across India.
- WeCare - Launched in 2020–21 for animal welfare, advocated for updating India's animal welfare laws and conducted awareness workshops in 70+ schools in partnership with 10 NGOs. The initiative was endorsed by Lok Sabha MP Maneka Gandhi and actress Barkha Singh.
- Ummeed-e-Milaap - An Indo-Pak Peace Initiative that was a student-led cross-border peace initiative in 2011–12, centred on an Indo-Pak Diary Campaign circulated across 30+ Mumbai colleges and three Pakistani institutions, LUMS-Spades (Lahore), AIESEC (Karachi), and FAST (Karachi-NLR). The diary was unveiled in India on 6 January 2012 and in Pakistan on 18 January 2012.
- Drishti - Techfest's eye donation awareness initiative, first launched in 2004–05 in association with the National Association for the Blind (NAB). Revived in 2021–22, it conducted 50 mythbuster sessions on cornea donation, recorded 500 pledges in a single day, and reached over 1,00,000 people.
- I SMOKE - An anti-smoking doodle campaign launched in 2013–14 across 64 colleges in India. It collected 21,383 doodles, earning an entry in the Limca Book of Records for the most doodles collected as part of an anti-smoking campaign.
- Green Campus Challenge - An environmental sustainability initiative in 2012–13 involving 99 tasks across 11 categories for college campuses. It saw participation from 750 colleges, led to the formation of 150 eco-clubs, and reached over 70,000 students nationally. It was recognised by the Centre for Environment Education (CEE) and SAYEN.
- Nidaan - Launched in 2019–20, spread awareness about breast cancer detection and treatment among young women. Conducted in partnership with 10 oncology-focused NGOs, it has organised 50+ sessions and reached approximately 13,000 people across India.
- WAVE-India - A 2,500+ km cross-country road trip conducted entirely on electric vehicles in 2011–12, making it one of India's first large-scale student-led EV awareness campaigns predating the National Electric Mobility Mission Plan (2013) by approximately one year.
- Cyclothon- Pedal for the Planet is a sustainability initiative promoting cycling to reduce carbon emissions from motor vehicles. It advocates for eco-friendly transportation and sustainable living to support environmental conservation and societal well-being.
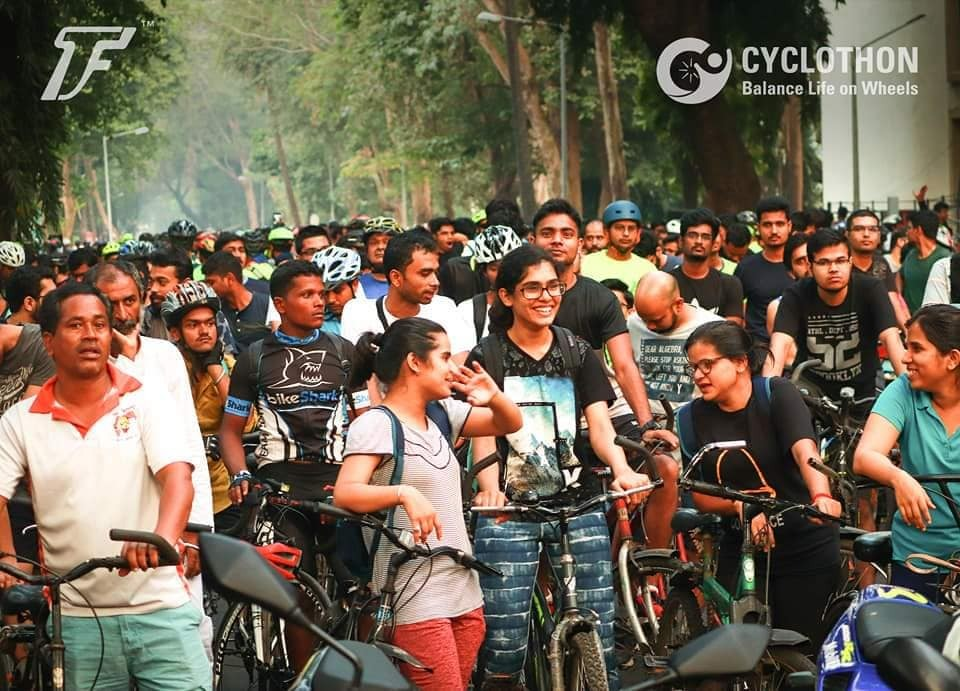
  Cyclothon

=== Summit ===
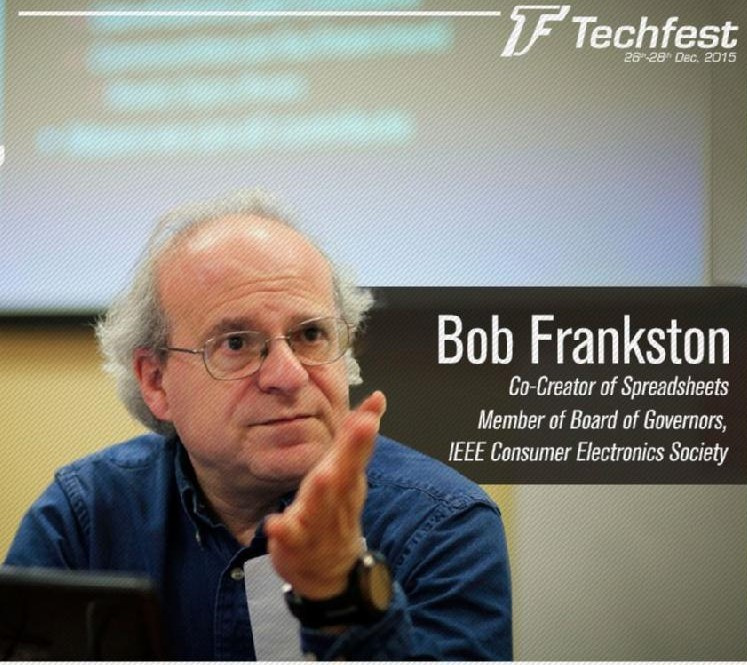
Bob Frankston at Techfest International Summit

Techfest has hosted an International Summit on topics like Artificial Intelligence and Internet of Things, over the years. An International summit was held in Techfest for two days. It focused on understanding how the business will be affected by these technologies which are rapidly adopted all over the world and how professionals may benefit from it as major technology companies and startups are embracing these strategies. The Inaugural Summit brought together corporates, entrepreneurs and investors alike, under one roof, to explore technologies like AI or IoT from business point of view. Professionals from various IT/Software cells and techies of various organizations across all strata of industry were invited to the summit. It allowed one to hear from the stalwarts of the industry and get the real picture in India and the World.

Techfest previous editions of summit consisted of panel discussions, workshops and keynote by speakers like Mr. Bob Frankston, Mr.Jeff Demain, Dr. Aloknath De, Mr. Sundara Nagalingam, Mr. Ishwar Parulkar, Mr. Rishi Bhatnagar, Mrs.Vidya Mani, Mr.Kaustubh Nande, Mr. Rafiq Somani, Mr. Rajendra Pratap Gupta, Mr. Anil Mathur, Mr. Kartik Iyengar, Mr. Parvez Goiporia along with other distinguished scholars. Workshops ware conducted by Microsoft, Intel, Texas Instruments, giving hands-on approach on various applications of AI, IoT etc.

The AI Summit of Techfest 2018–19, held on 14 and 15 Dec 2018, included names like Mudit Jakhar, Vikram Vij, Sohan Maheshwar, Mohammed Saleem, Siddhi Trivedi, Rajesh Sharma, Kapil Garg, Jalaj Thanaki, Pushpak Bhattacharyya, Surya Durbha, Mudit Garg, Aseem. The people discussed the relevance of Artificial Intelligence incorporates and day-to-day life. Hands-on workshops giving a complete experience of the capabilities of AI were also conducted.

The summit of 2019-2020 was held between 3 and 5 January, was attended by names like Atul Tripathy, Atul Jalan, Uptal Chakrab0rty, Rajesh Sharma, Mudit Jakhar and Chetan Murty, the summit discussed points like Smart Mobility, Artificial Intelligence in Industries and Smart Manufacturing.

Techfest’s International Media Summit of 2020-21 was India's leading conference of acclaimed journalists and senior executives from all across the world. At the International Media Summit, topics related to the fields of Journalism and Media were discussed, which are tied closely with technology and help develop a deeper understanding of this rapidly evolving domain. It featured stalwarts of the field like Paul Pringle, Ravish Kumar, Rajdeep Sardesai, Farah Stockman, and Michael Braga.

Techfest 2021-2022 includes the first edition of the Fintech Summit, which primarily focuses on India’s Fintech Revolution, the future of money management, and reviewing banking and financial services post Covid-19. The International Fintech Summit is the ideal meeting place for facilitating multi-stakeholder dialogue with power-packed networking opportunities among C-Level executives, leading industry experts, decision-makers, and policymakers from across the value chain to foster collaboration, discuss current challenges and business opportunities, develop market strategies, share knowledge and identify solutions aimed at shaping the future of Fintech. Many Fintech giants were featured like Viral V. Acharya, Abhishek Kothari, Yashish Dahiya, Ruchir Swarup, Ganesh Rengaswamy, Priya Sharma, Arun Kumar, Samy Karim, Rajeev Agrawal, Vaibhav Garg.

Techfest 2022-2023 included International Industry Summit, Techfest Blockchain Summit, Media summit. The International Industry Summit aimed at discussing the trends that are bringing this change and changing the consumer’s perspective to this new way of shopping. Many industrial giants like Sanjeev Bikhchandani, Naveen Munjal, V Kalyana Rama, John Crichton, Abhishek Gupta, PrasunKumar, Sandeep Karwa and Soumya Sarkar were featured. The Techfest Blockchain Summit aimed at bringing together some of the world’s leading crypto influencers, policymakers, key government delegates, media, family offices, HNIs and other curated investors, among others, to foster the crypto and blockchain community across the globe. Many blockchain giants were featured like Kunal Sanghavi, Teddy Pahagbia, Shantnoo Saxsena, Pranay Sharma, Mru Patel, Alias Ahonen, Ryan Howells, and Lokesh Rao. Techfest also conducted the Media summit where you navigate the new playbook for Media as you future-ready yourself for the post-pandemic economy. Many Media giants were featured like Avinash Panday, Smriti Mehra, Arpit Jain, Manuja Veerappa.

=== Workshops ===
Workshops at Techfest, IIT Bombay play a vital role in connecting students with the latest advancements in technology through hands-on learning experiences. Conducted under the guidance of industry professionals and academicians, these workshops attract a large number of participants due to their high-quality content and practical approach.

Over the years, Techfest has expanded its workshop offerings to include a wide range of emerging technologies. The 25th edition featured workshops on Solarizer, Python Programming, Artificial Intelligence, Machine Learning, Data Analytics, Automobile Mechanics, Android Development, Cybersecurity, Ethical Hacking, Web Development, Amazon Web Services, Nanotechnology, Sixth Sense Technology, Embedded Systems, and Deep Learning.

In the 2022-23 edition, workshops covered topics such as Quadcopter building, Ethical Hacking, Machine Learning, Android Development, Gesture Robotics, Game Development, Crypto Trading, Solarizer, Digital Marketing, Sixth Sense Robotics, Automobile Mechanics, Data Analytics, Python, and Artificial Intelligence. These sessions were led by professionals from reputed organizations including Google, Ubisoft, WazirX, Sharedeum, and Fev.

The 2024-25 edition, workshops included Artificial Intelligence, Blockchain, Digital Marketing, Web Development, Ethical Hacking, Cybersecurity, and Prompt Engineering. These workshops provided certificates, interactive learning sessions, and networking opportunities for participants of all skill levels.

In its 2025-26 edition, Techfest expanded its flagship workshop series to bridge standard academic fundamentals with contemporary, market-driven specialized tracks. While continuing to offer classic technical domains popularized in older editions; such as Autonomous Robotics, Internet of Things (IoT), and foundational Machine Learning; the festival integrated new training tracks in advanced Artificial Intelligence (AI) engineering, industrial Cybersecurity frameworks, and automated Stock Market Analysis. These training tracks were curated and certified in collaboration with prominent global industry entities, including Google, Amazon, and the Bombay Stock Exchange (BSE).

Apart from workshops, Techfest also organizes initiatives like the WinTech Project, aimed at fostering innovation and practical learning among students.

=== EduFair ===
EduFair is an educational exhibition and outreach initiative organized as a part of Techfest, IIT Bombay. EduFair primarily focuses on promoting awareness about higher education opportunities, research and skill development among students across India.

The exhibition features participation from more than 20+ international universities. EduFair provides attendees with opportunities for live one-on-one counseling sessions related to higher education, career pathways, scholarships. EduFair has attracted a participation of over 20,000 in 2025 from students belonging to schools, colleges, and technical institutions, contributing to Techfest’s broader objective of fostering scientific temper and technological awareness.

Some of the prominent universities like National University of Singapore, Campus France, Consulate General Hungary, Nottingham Trent University, Melbourne University Australia and British Council IELTS.

=== Virtual Ed-Conclave ===
Techfest 2021-22 kick-started a new pan India initiative, namely Virtual Ed-Conclave. This two-day conclave consists of various keynote sessions on different departments followed by Q&A from renowned professors, Deans, and Head of Department from prominent IITs. This event aimed to make freshly JEE qualified students aware of the different departments IITs offer, helping them make an informed decision in choosing their technical stream. With an annual reach of over 50,000, Ed-Conclave helps students all over India to become aware about the whereabouts of various engineering fields and hence make knowledgeable decision for their future.

Prominent speakers at Ed-Conclave include:

- Prof. Chebrolu (Associate Professor of Computer Science and Engineering at IIT Bombay)
- Prof. Arghya Deb (Associate Dean (Infrastructure), IIT Kharagpur and Professor of Civil Engineering)
- Prof. Shantanu Roy (Dean of Academics, IIT Delhi and Professor of Chemical Engineering)
- Prof. Ravi Kumar NV (Head of the Department, Metallurgical & Materials Engineering at IIT Madras)
- Prof. Amit Agrawal (Dean of International Affairs, IIT Bombay and Institute chair Professor of Mechanical Engineering)
- Prof. Ameeya K. Nayak (Associate Professor of Mathematics, IIT Roorkee)
- Prof. VC Srivastava (Head of the Department, Chemical Engineering at IIT Roorkee)
- Prof. SK Mathur (Associate Professor of Economics at IIT Kanpur)
- Prof. Preeti Ranjan Panda (Professor of Computer Science and Engineering at IIT Delhi)
- Prof. Deepankar Choudhary (Head of the Department, Civil Engineering at IIT Bombay | Organising Vice-Chairman, JEE-Advanced 2015 and Founding Member, JOSAA)
- Prof. Sanjeeva Srivastava (Professor of Biosciences and Bioengineering at IIT Bombay)
- Prof. Nagarajan R (Head of the Department, Chemical Engineering at IIT Madras)
- Prof. Suhas Joshi (Dean Alumni and Corporate Relations, IIT Bombay and Rahul Bajaj Chair Professor of Mechanical Engineering)
- Prof. Dipanwita Roy (Head of the Department, Computer Science and Engineering at IIT Kharagpur)
- Prof. Surjya K Pal (Associate Dean (Alumni Affairs), IIT Kharagpur and Professor of Mechanical Engineering)
- Prof. U Bhandarkar(Associate Dean R&D, IIT Bombay and Professor of Mechanical Engineering)
- Prof. Anidhya Dutta(Professor at Chemistry Department, IIT Bombay)
- Prof. Rajesh Zele (Professor of Electrical Engineering at IIT Bombay)
- Prof. Parag Bhargava (Professor of Metallurgy and Material Sciences at IIT Bombay)
- Prof. Rajkumar S. Pant (Professor of Aerospace engineering at IIT Bombay)
- Prof. D N Singh (Professor of Civil Engineering at IIT Bombay)
- Prof. G P Raja Sekhar (Professor of Mathematics and Computing at IIT Kharagpur)

== Associates and Partners ==
Techfest receives extensive coverage in print, television, digital as well as online media. Techfest has had Hindustan Times, DNA, Times of India, Indian Express, Maharashtra Times, Navbharat Times, CNBC, Times Internet, Discovery Channel, Big RTL Thrill, India Today, Big CBS Prime, 93.5 RED FM and 92.7 BIG FM as its media partners. In the past, consulates and embassies of Norway, Mexico, Luxembourg, Italy, Netherlands, Israel, Germany, Australia, Austria, Hungary, South Korea, France, Spain, Canada and Indonesia have supported Techfest in its endeavours. In terms of industrial and corporate associations, Techfest receives sponsorship from a wide range of sectors such as Telecom, PSUs, Banking, Crypto, Fintech, FMCG, Automobile, Electronics. Techfest has associated with top firms such as Marsh McLennan, State Bank of India, Amazon Prime Video, Reliance Jio Infocomm Ltd, which had the national launch of its 4G Free Wifi in Techfest 2014, Google, Microsoft, Intel, Larsen & Toubro, GE, IBM, NTPC, PepsiCo, Nestle, RuPay, WD and many more such sponsors. Organisations such as DAAD, Alliance Française, British Council, Goethe Institute, German Centre for Research and Innovation, Polish Institute, Swissnex and India-Sri Lanka Foundation have also partnered with Techfest for the promotion of Science and Technology, education and cultural exchange. Social initiatives of Techfest have received the support of esteemed NGOs such as CRY, Smile Foundation, Khushi Life Learning, Befrienders India, Pratham, Muktangan, Suicide Prevention India Foundation, Garbage Concern Welfare Society, Indian Cancer Society, Laadli, Akshara and The Candle Project. With diverse participation, Techfest is engaging and interacting with the youth of the country. `Techfest has also collaborated with universities like ETH Zurich, KOC University, KTH, NUS and Melbourne University.
