= IIT Bombay =

Research Institute in Mumbai, India

Coordinates: 19°08′01.09″N 72°54′55.29″E

Indian Institute of Technology Bombay
- Motto: Jñānam paramam dhyeyam (Sanskrit)
- Motto in English: Knowledge is the Supreme Goal
- Type: Technical institute
- Established: 1958; 68 years ago
- Budget: ₹896 crore (US$93 million) (2025–2026)
- Chairman: Koppillil Radhakrishnan
- Director: Shireesh Kedare
- Academic staff: 732 faculty members (January 2025)
- Students: 13,282 (2023–2024)
- Undergraduates: 6,276 (2023–2024)
- Postgraduates: 3,319 (2023–2024)
- Doctoral students: 3,687 (2023–2024)
- Location: Adi Shankaracharya Marg, Mumbai, Maharashtra, India
- Campus: 545 acres (221 ha); Urban
- Colours: Prussian Blue & Silver
- Website: www.iitb.ac.in

The Indian Institute of Technology Bombay (IIT- Bombay or IIT-B) is a public research university and technical institute in Mumbai, Maharashtra, India. It is one of the 23 Indian Institutes of Technology created to be a Centre of Excellence for India's training, research and development in science, engineering and technology. The institute has 17 academic departments, 35 additional academic centres, and three schools. Established in 1958, IIT Bombay was designated as an Institution of Eminence in 2018.

Admission is through JEE Advanced, and the institute has been reported as a top choice among high-ranking candidates.

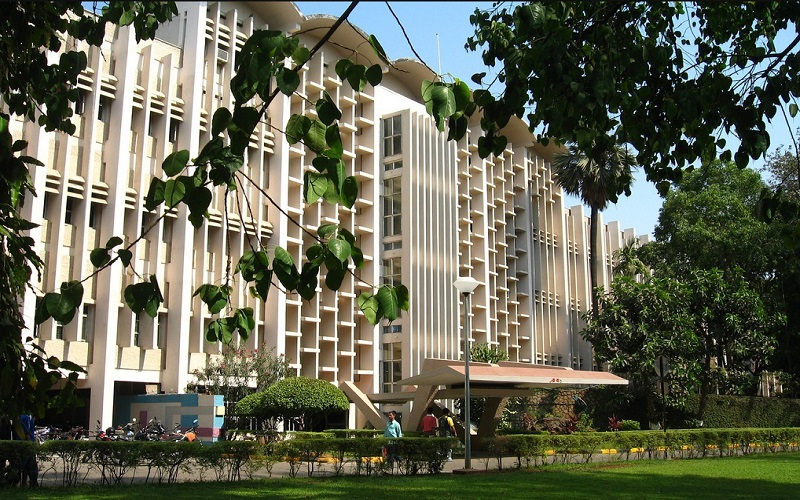
Main Building of IIT Bombay

== History ==
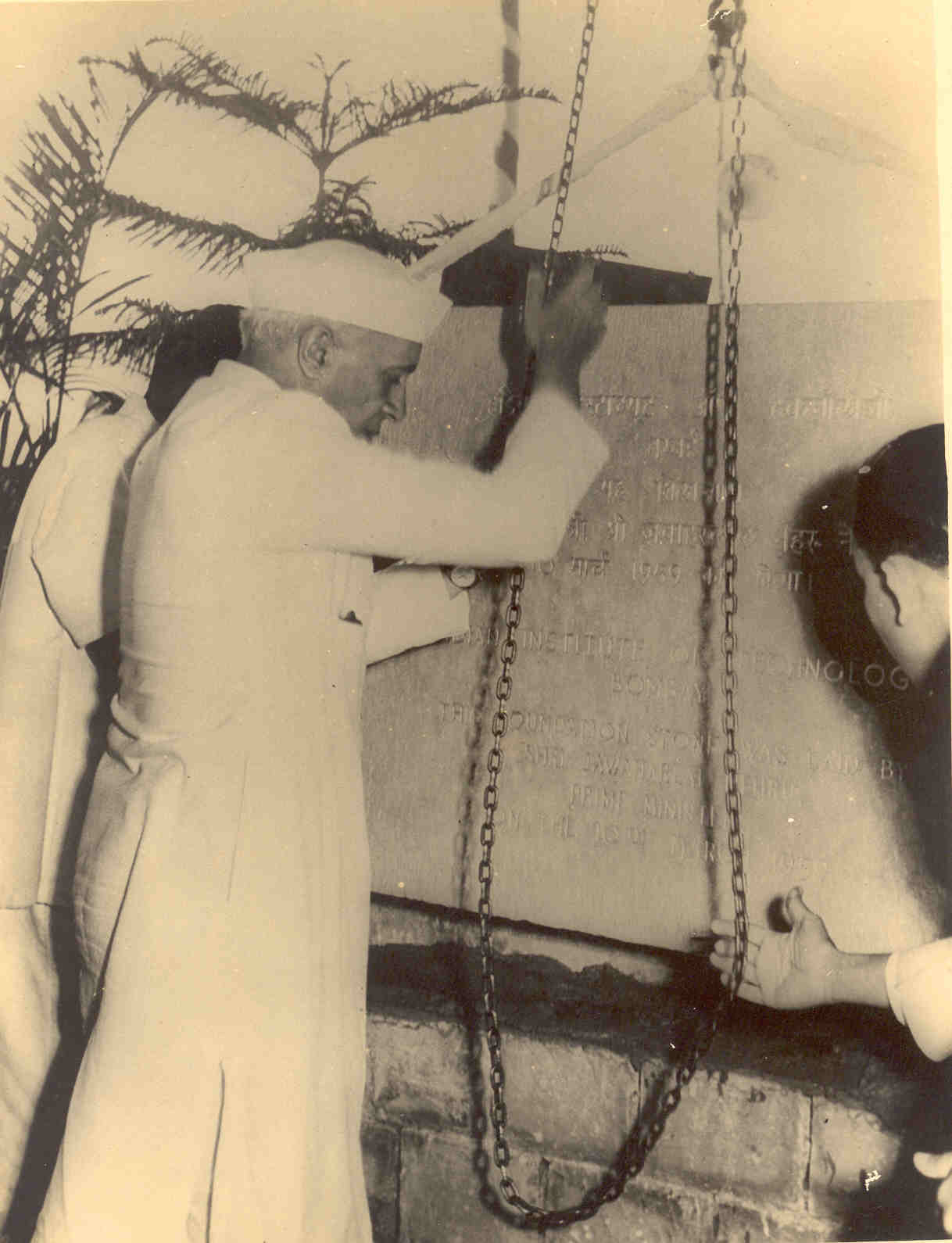
IIT Bombay's foundation stone being laid by Jawaharlal Nehru in 1959

IIT Bombay, established in 1958, was the second Indian Institute of Technology to be founded. Its establishment was supported by UNESCO, with funding provided by the Soviet Union. The proposed site for the institute, allocated by the government of Bombay State, was Powai in what is now Mumbai, then known as Bombay. The institute's first batch, composed of 100 male students, commenced their studies in a temporary facility in Worli during their first year due to the construction of the campus in Powai. They graduated in 1962.

On 9 July 2018, Prakash Javadekar, the Union Minister of Human Resources Development, announced that IIT Bombay would be granted the status of Institution of Eminence. The decision came into effect on 11 October 2018.

== Campus ==
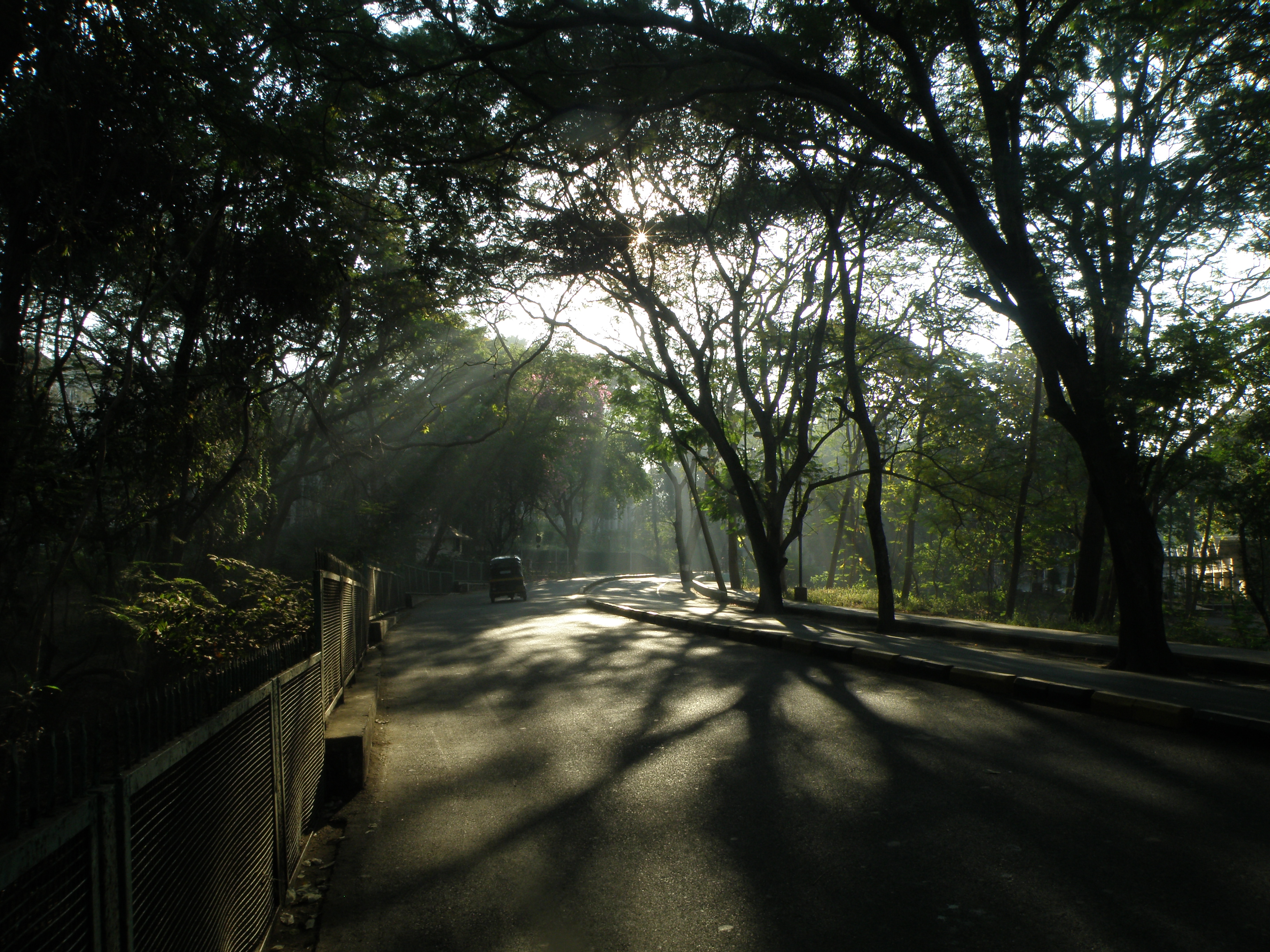
IIT Bombay's Main Road

The 545-acre IIT Bombay campus is located between Powai lake and Vihar lake, roughly 15 kilometres away from the Chhatrapati Shivaji Maharaj International Airport. The institute has a total of 21 hostels, with Hostels 10, 15, 11, and a wing of Hostel 21 & Hostel 16 reserved for female students.

Due to its proximity to the Sanjay Gandhi National Park, the campus has enjoyed significant green cover. The proximity of the campus to the national park has also led to occasional sightings of leopards and mugger crocodiles. On rare occasions, they have strayed into the campus.

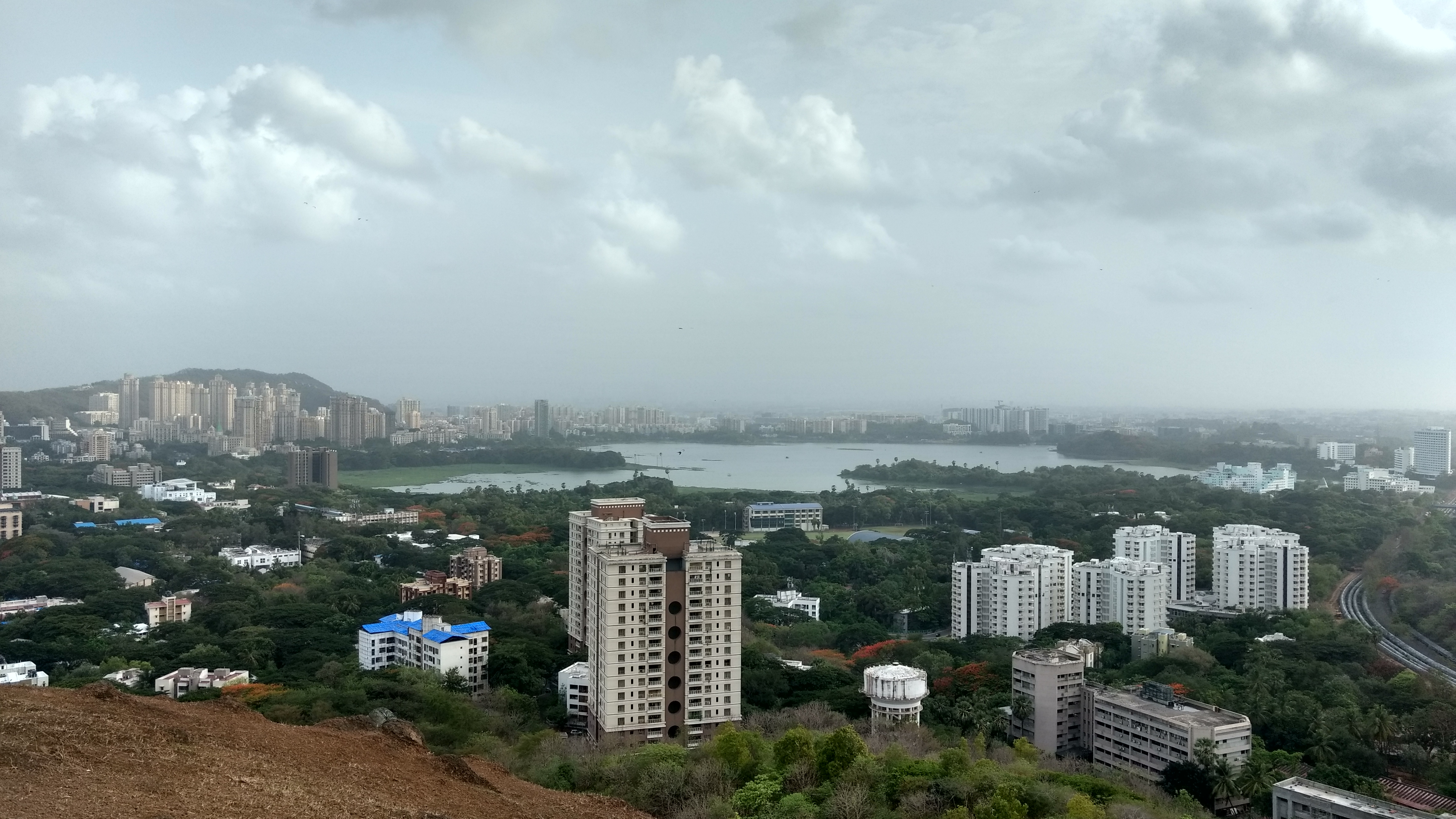
View of IIT Bombay's Hostels

The institute has two swimming pools; football, hockey, and cricket grounds; as well as tennis, basketball, squash, and volleyball courts. It also has a Students' Activity Center (SAC) for various cultural and extracurricular activities.

== Organisation and administration ==
=== Governance ===
At the institutional level, IIT Bombay is governed by a Board of Governors. The chairman is nominated by the President of India, under the guidance of the IIT Council. The Director, appointed by the Union Minister of Education, is also a member of the Board, while the Registrar acts as its secretary. The Director, the executive head, chairs the institute's Senate, which comprises professors and nominated members. The Senate is IIT Bombay's highest academic body.

The Director and two Deputy Directors are the principal figures responsible for executing the institute's activities. They are supported by seven Deans as well as the heads of departments, centres, and schools.

=== Academic Office ===
The Academic Office of the institute exists to facilitate, initiate and co-ordinate the academic work of the institute, particularly the teaching and assessment of students. It acts as a repository of grades and academic records of all students, both former and current. It provides administrative support to the Senate.

=== Departments, centres, and schools ===
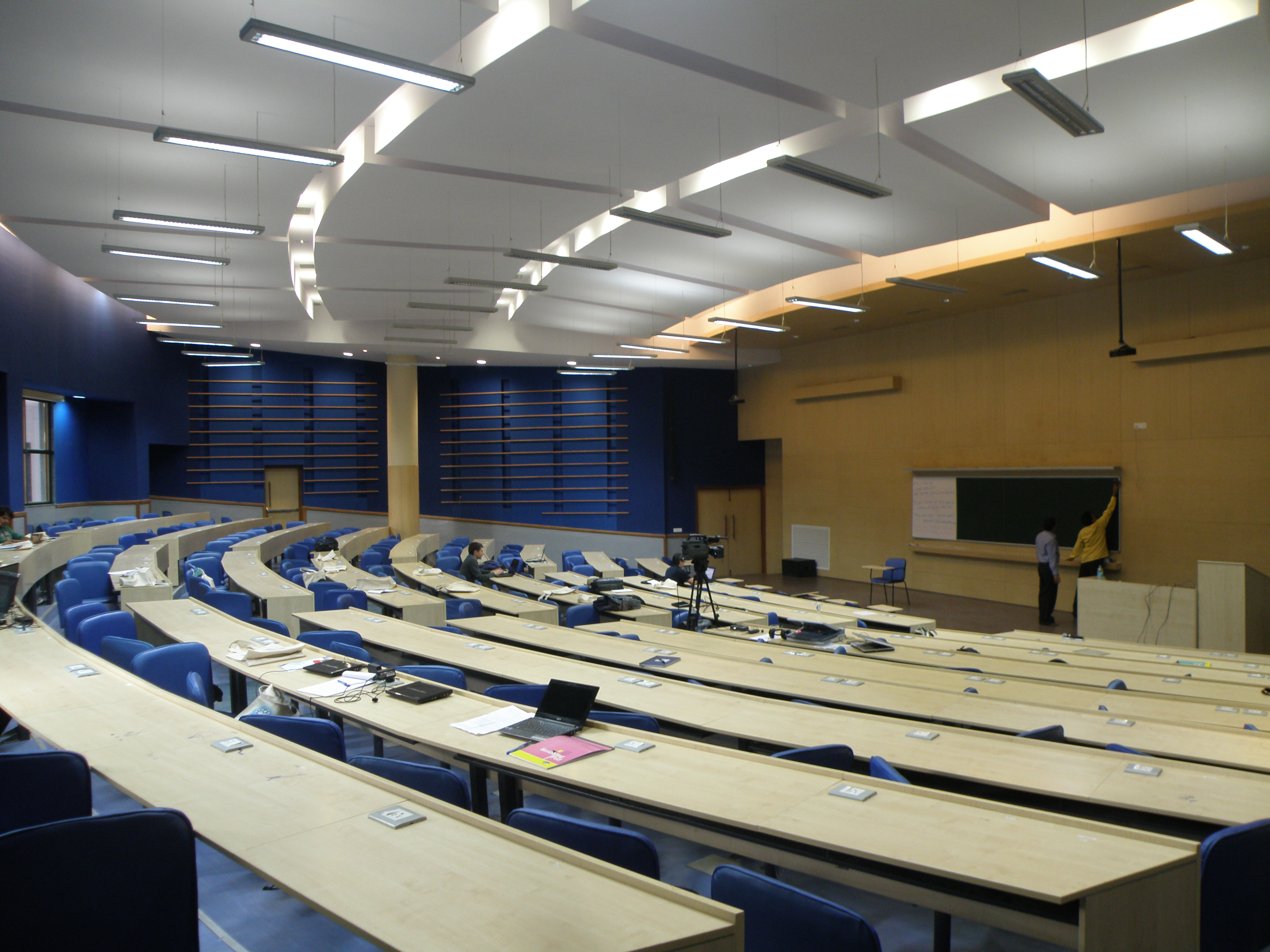
Lecture hall complex

IIT Bombay has 17 departments, 35 additional academic centres, and three schools.

==== Academic departments ====
- Aerospace Engineering
- Biosciences and Bioengineering
- Chemical Engineering
- Chemistry
- Civil Engineering
- Computer Science & Engineering
- Earth Sciences
- Economics
- Electrical Engineering
- Energy Science and Engineering
- Environmental Science and Engineering (ESED)
- Humanities & Social Science
- Industrial Engineering & Operations Research (IEOR)
- Mathematics
- Mechanical engineering
- Metallurgical Engineering & Materials Science
- Physics

==== Academic centres ====
- Application Software Centre (ASC)
- Ashank Desai Centre for Policy Studies (ADCPS)
- Biomedical Engineering and Technology Incubation Centre (BETiC)
- Computer Centre (CC)
- Centre for Climate Studies
- Centre for Defence Technology Innovations and Strategies (CDTIS)
- Centre for Distance Engineering and Education Programme (CDEEP)
- Centre for Educational Technology
- Centre for Liberal Education (CLE)
- Centre for Machine Intelligence and Data Science (C-MinDS)
- Centre for Research in Nanotechnology and Science (CRNTS)
- Centre for Semiconductor Technologies (SemiX)
- Centre for Systems and Control Engineering
- Centre for Technology Alternatives for Rural Areas (CTARA)
- Centre for Traditional Indian Knowledge and Skills (CTIKS)
- Centre of Excellence in Oil, Gas and Energy (CoE-OGE)
- Centre of Excellence in Quantum Information, Computing, Science and Technology (CoE-QuICST)
- Centre of Excellence in Steel Technology (CoEST)
- Centre of Excellence on Membrane Technologies for Desalination, Brine Management, and Water Recycling
- Centre of Studies in Resources Engineering (CSRE)
- DRDO-Industry-Academia Centre of Excellence (DIA-CoE)
- Geospatial Information Science and Engineering
- IITB-Monash Research Academy
- Koita Centre for Digital Health (KCDH)
- National Centre for Mathematics (NCM)
- National Centre for Photovoltaic Research and Education (NCPRE)
- National Centre of Excellence in Carbon Capture and Utilization (NCoE-CCU)
- National Centre of Excellence in Technology for Internal Security (NCETIS)
- Parimal and Pramod Chaudhari Centre for Learning and Teaching (PPCCLT)
- Sophisticated Analytical Instrument Facility (SAIF)
- Sunita Sanghi Centre of Ageing and Neurodegenerative Diseases (SCAN)
- Tata Centre for Technology and Design (TCTD)
- Technocraft Centre for Applied Artificial Intelligence (TCAAI)
- Wadhwani Research Centre for Bioengineering (WRCB)
- Water Innovation Centre: Technology, Research and Education (WICTRE)

==== Schools ====
- Desai Sethi School of Entrepreneurship (DSSE)
- IDC School of Design
- Shailesh J. Mehta School of Management (SJMSoM)

== Academics ==
=== Programmes ===
IIT Bombay is mainly recognized for its highly competitive Bachelor of Technology (BTech) programme. It also offers Bachelor of Science (BS) and Bachelor of Design (B.Design) programmes at the undergraduate level. At the postgraduate level, it offers a wide range of programmes, such as Master of Technology (MTech), Master of Science by Research (MS by Research), Master of Science (MSc), Master of Design (M.Design), Master of Business Administration (MBA). The institute also offers doctoral (PhD) programmes and dual degrees. Additionally, the institute further offers short-term courses through continuing education and distance education programmes. The university is a member of Links to Asia by Organising Traineeship and Student Exchange (LAOTSE), an international network of leading universities in Europe and Asia exchanging students and senior scholars.

Every year, IIT Bombay awards degrees to more than a thousand students. The undergraduate students at IIT Bombay are selected through the Joint Entrance Examination (JEE). The graduate students are selected through Joint Admission Test for Masters (JAM) and Graduate Aptitude Test in Engineering (GATE). The institute currently holds more than 13,000 students and employs over 700 faculty members.

In April 2015, IIT Bombay launched the first United States-India joint Executive Master of Business Administration (EMBA) programme alongside Washington University in St. Louis. In November 2015 and January 2016, the National Virtual Academy for Indian Agriculture launched a free online agriculture course in collaboration with International Crops Research Institute for the Semi-Arid Tropics and IIT Bombay.

=== Research ===
Faculty members at IIT Bombay engage in industry-sponsored research and consultancy projects facilitated through the institute. These initiatives receive funding from a various national agencies, such as the Department of Science and Technology, Department of Space, Department of Atomic Energy, among others. Several projects are of national significance, while some are supported by international funding bodies. On average, around 400 sponsored projects are active in a given year.

=== Rankings ===
University and college rankings

General – international
- QS (World) (2025): 129
- QS (Asia) (2023): 48

General – India
- NIRF (Overall) (2024): 3
- NIRF (Research) (2024): 4

Engineering – India
- NIRF (2024): 3
- India Today (2022): 2
- Government colleges
- Outlook India (2022): 3

Business/Management – India
- NIRF (2024): 10

Internationally, IIT Bombay was ranked 129 in the QS World University Rankings of 2025 and 36th in Asia.

Nationally, IIT Bombay was ranked 3rd overall, 4th among research institutions, 3rd among engineering colleges, and 10th among management schools, by the National Institutional Ranking Framework (NIRF) in 2024. Outlook India ranked IIT Bombay 3rd among government engineering colleges in 2023. IIT Bombay was ranked 1st in the QS India Rankings of 2025 and 118th in the QS World University Rankings. IIT Bombay was ranked 2nd by India Today, for engineering colleges.

== Student activities ==
IIT Bombay's Gymkhana serves as the overarching body for all student councils and institutional committees responsible for coordinating student activities and organising events and festivals throughout the year.

The Student Affairs Council (SAC) is the apex student representative body at the Indian Institute of Technology Bombay. It coordinates student affairs through six Institute General Secretaries, each heading a major portfolio of student activities and services.

General Secretary Hostel Affairs (GSHA) — Aditya Adinath Joshi

The GSHA heads the Hostel Affairs Council (HAC) and oversees the institute’s hostel and residential affairs. Its responsibilities include hostel administration, infrastructure and maintenance, hostel allocation, messes and food services, canteens and shops, hostel welfare, hygiene, security, sustainability, transportation, student grievances and other residential facilities and services. The GSHA also coordinates with hostel-level councils and representatives on matters affecting students’ day-to-day residential experience.

General Secretary Academic Affairs (PG) — Ms. Anshu

Heads the postgraduate academic affairs portfolio and represents postgraduate students on matters relating to academics, curriculum, research and academic administration.

General Secretary Academic Affairs (UG) — Siddhant S Gupta

Heads undergraduate academic affairs and represents undergraduate students on matters including curriculum, academic administration, academic opportunities and undergraduate academic concerns.

General Secretary Sports Affairs — Deepraj S Kasherwal

Heads the Sports Council and oversees institute sports, competitive teams, sporting facilities, training, inter-IIT participation and recreational sports activities.

General Secretary Technical Affairs — Veeraditya Parakh

Heads the Institute Technical Council and oversees the institute’s technical clubs, projects, competitions, innovation initiatives and student-led technology activities.

General Secretary Cultural Affairs — Omprakash Chaturvedi

Heads the Cultural Council and oversees cultural clubs, artistic activities, performances, competitions and institute-wide cultural programmes.

The institute hosts several notable student festivals, such as Mood Indigo and Techfest.

== Notable people ==
Notable Alumni of IIT Bombay people

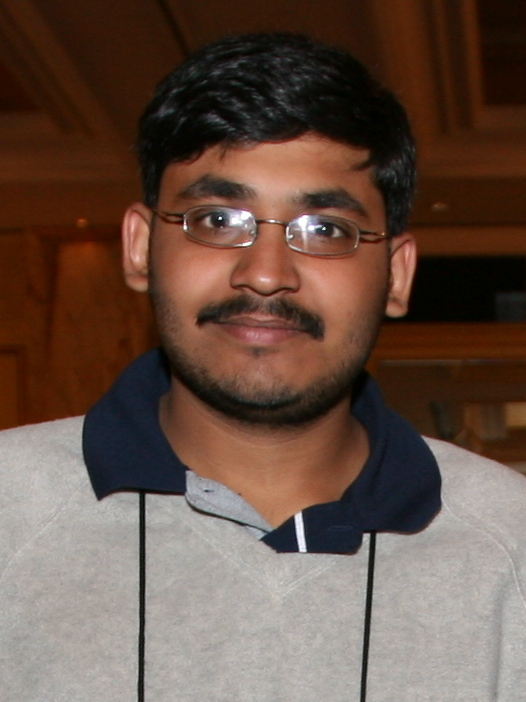
Parag Agrawal - Former CEO of Twitter

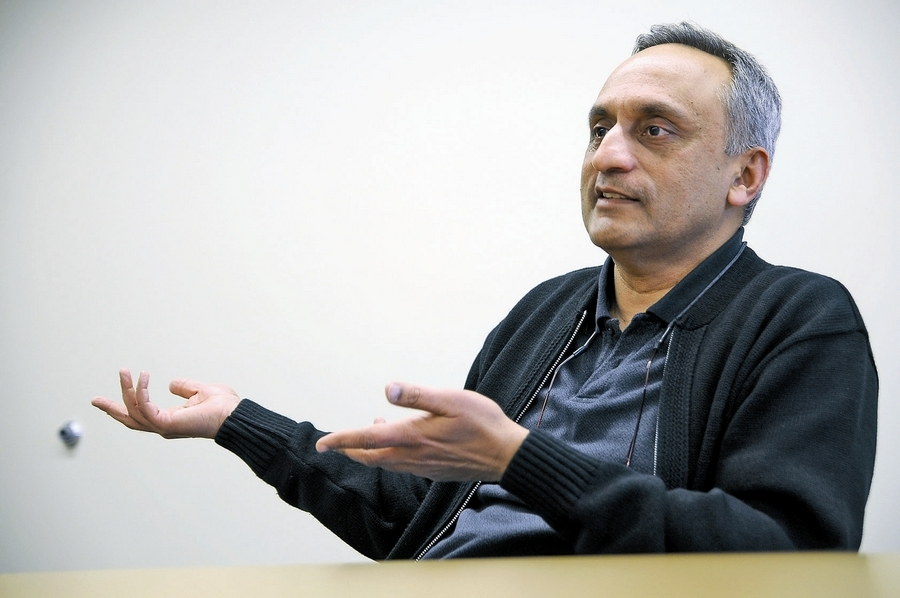
Manoj Bhargava - Founder of Innovations Ventures LLC that produces the 5-hour Energy drink

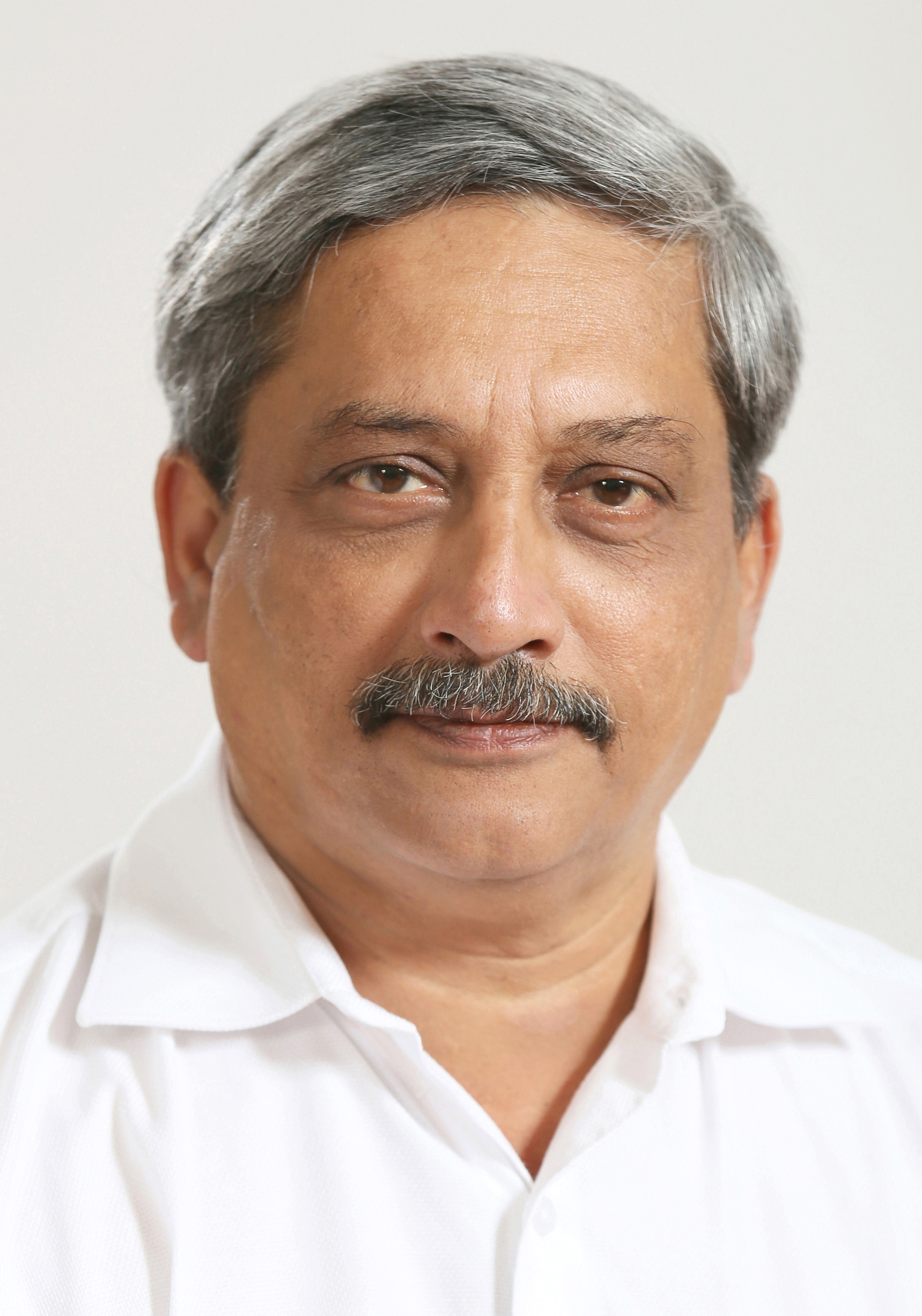
Manohar Parrikar - Eighth Chief Minister of Goa and Padma Bhushan recipient

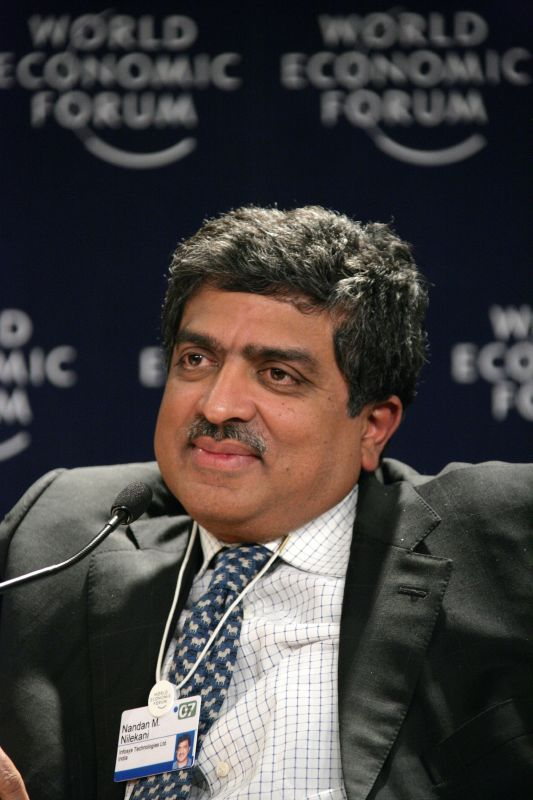
Nandan Nilekani - Co-founder of Infosys

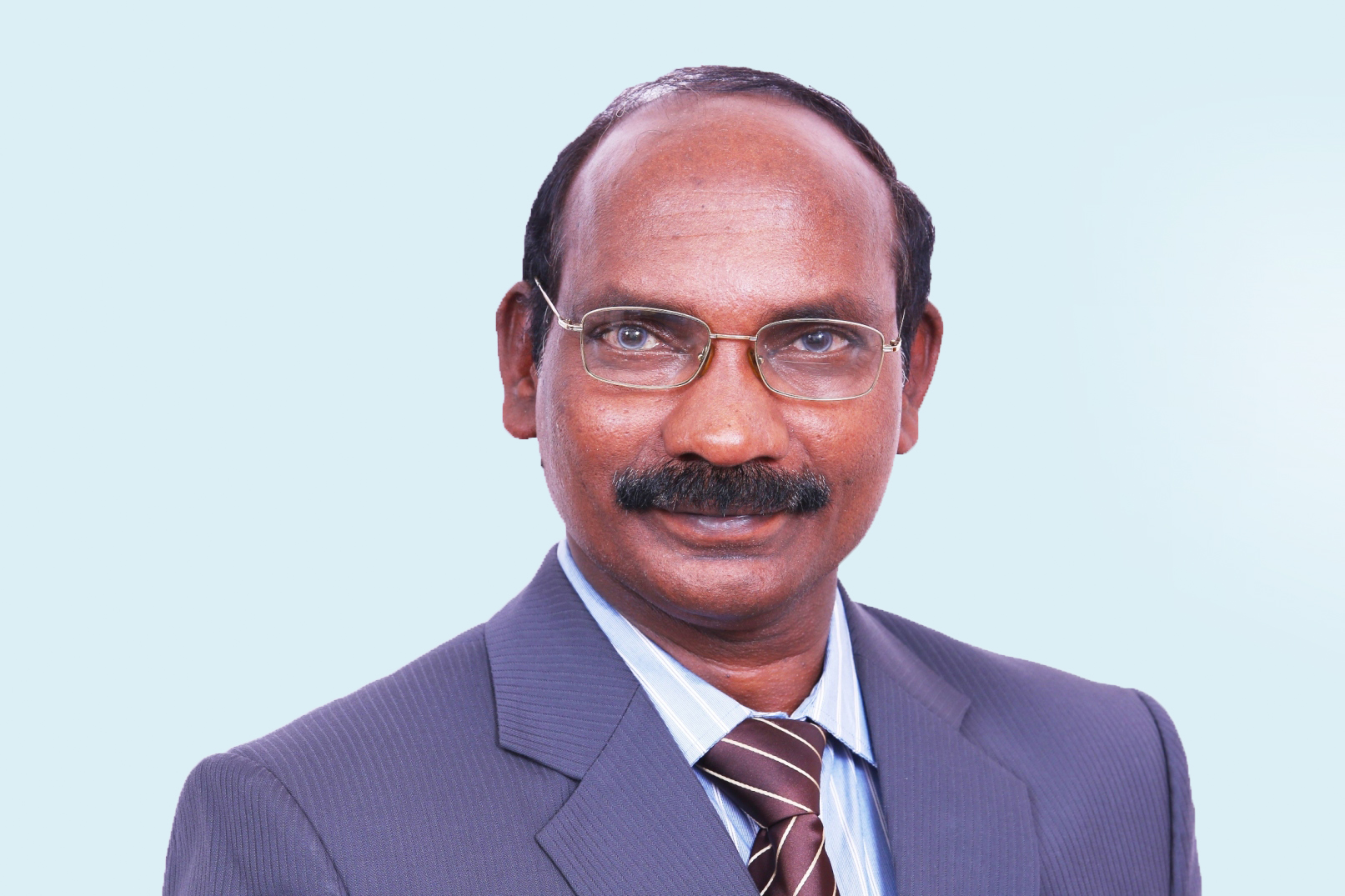
K. Sivan - Former chair of the ISRO
- Bhavish Aggarwal (co-founder of Ola Cabs)
- Jairam Ramesh (Member of Parliament)
- K. Sivan (former chairman of ISRO)
- Nandan Nilekani (non - executive chairman, Infosys)
- Nitesh Tiwari (film director, screenwriter, lyricist)
- Satyendra Pakhalé (designer, architect, artist)
- Parag Agrawal (former CEO of Twitter)
- Raghu Raghuram (CEO, VMware)
- Manohar Parrikar (former Union Minister Of Defense and Ex CM, Goa)
- Vipul Goyal (stand up comedian)
- Colin Gonsalves (Senior Advocate of the Supreme Court of India)
- Viral Acharya (Former Deputy Governor of Reserve Bank of India)
- Dhirendra Nath Buragohain, founder director of IIT Guwahati
- Raj Subramaniam (CEO, FedEx)

== See also ==
- Indian Institutes of Technology
- Indian Institute of Information Technology
- List of universities in India
- National Institutes of Technology
- National Testing Agency
- Joint Seat Allocation Authority
