= IITB-Monash Research Academy =

The IITB-Monash Research Academy is a graduate research school located in Mumbai, India. It opened in 2008 as a joint venture between the Indian Institute of Technology Bombay and Monash University. Students of the Academy study for a dual PhD from both institutions, spending time in both Australia and India, with supervisors from both IITB and Monash. The establishment of the academy marked the first time that an Australian university has set up an extensive physical presence in India.

== History ==
In 2006, vice-chancellor of Monash Richard Larkins went on a tour of India with senior Monash staff and an executive from BHP. The tour was led by Monash Dean of Engineering Tam Sridhar, an Indian-Australian professor. The team met with research institutions, public officials and industry research bodies around the country.

After extensive negotiations, Monash University and IITB signed an agreement to undertake joint research and establish a graduate research school together. The agreement was signed on 7 March 2006 in the presence of then Australian Prime Minister John Howard. The academy attracted early industry support, with a commitment from BHP and Infosys to joint research and commercialisation.

The academy was officially opened on 26 November 2008. 36 research projects began immediately, with several hundred further projects in the planning phase.

By June 2009, 41 PhD students were enrolled at the academy. By 2012, that number had risen to 80. It is expected that the Academy will eventually house around 250-300 PhD students at any one time.

== Research ==
The academy's research encompasses a range of issues of concern to industry and government in Australia and India. This includes clean energy, water, biotechnology, infrastructure engineering, stem cells, advanced computational engineering and nanotechnology. The academy has five foundation partners, each of whom will contribute around $1–2 million in research sponsorship in the early years of the academy. The foundation partners were Infosys, BHP, Shell, the CSIRO and the Australian Stem Cell Centre.

== Location ==
The academy is located at IITB's campus in Powai, Mumbai.

== Governance ==
The IITB-Monash Research Academy is governed by a board of directors, advisory council (a consultative body), and chief executive officer. The board consists primarily of senior management figures from Monash and IITB. The advisory council is made up of leaders from scientific research and industry, including Narayana Murthy (founder of Indian software company Infosys) and Australian biologist Gustav Nossal. Mohan Krishnamoorthy was the CEO of the Academy from 2008-2015. Professor Murali Sastry was the CEO from 2015-2020. The current CEO is M. S. Unnikrishnan.
