= Murali Krishna =

Murali Krishna may refer to:

- Krishna, the Hindu god when depicted playing his murali (flute)
- Murali Krishna (film), a 1964 Indian Telugu-language drama film
- Murali Krishna (director), Indian film director
- Posani Krishna Murali, Indian actor and filmmaker

== See also ==
- Murali (disambiguation)
- Krishna (disambiguation)
- Murali Krishnudu, a 1988 Indian Telugu-language film
