= B. Murali =

South Indian author

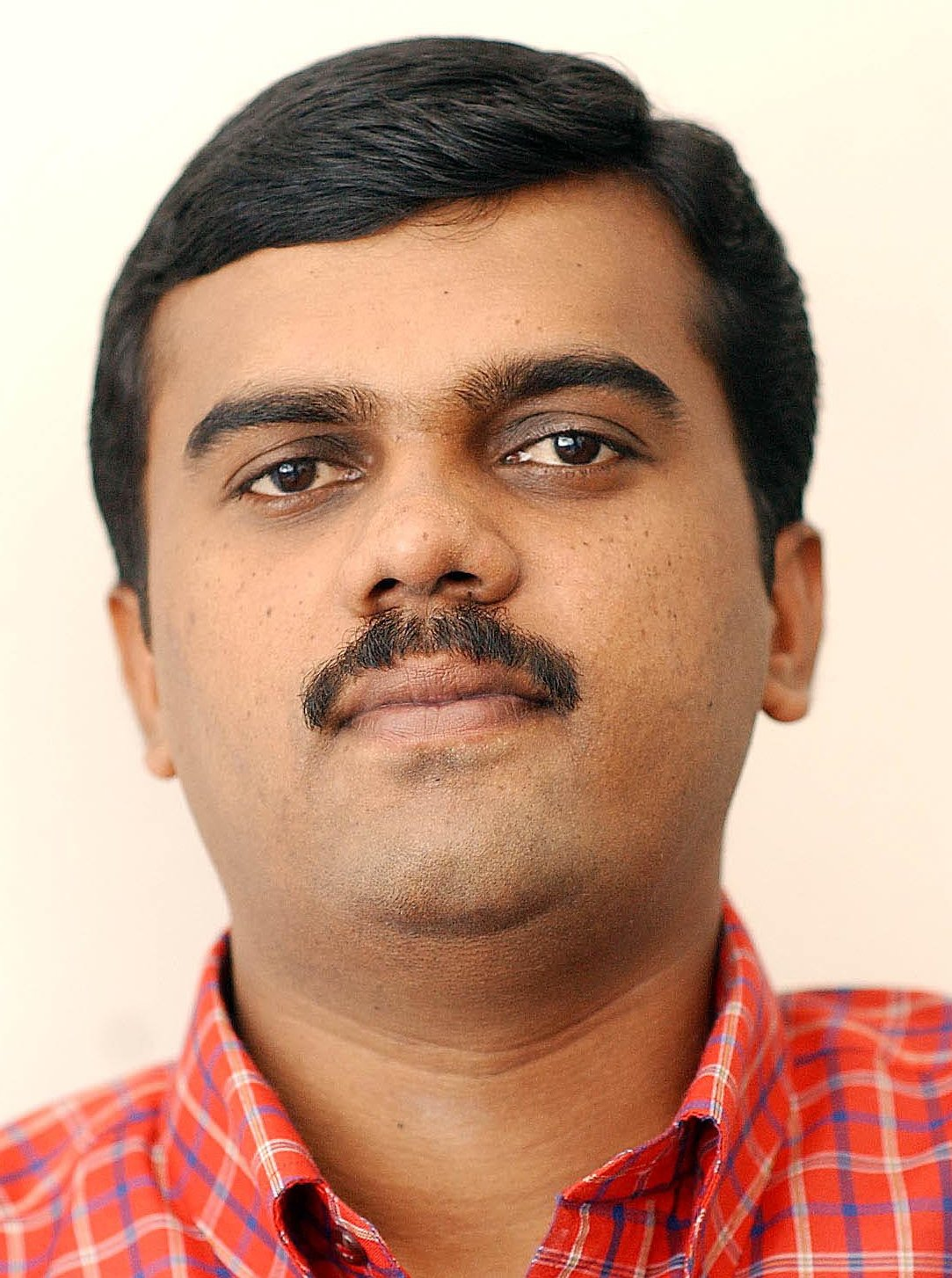
B. Murali

B. Murali (born 3 April 1971) is a Malayalam short story writer and a novelist. He is a journalist working in Malayala Manorama.

== Collections of short stories ==
- Umberto Eco
- Poomudikkettazhinjathum Pushpajalam Kozhinjathum
- Kodathi Varanthayile Kafka
- Protozoa
- Haritha Vaisikam
- Kaamuki
- Panchami Bar
- 100 stories

== Novels ==
- Alakampadi
- Ninte Chorayile Veenju
- Agamyam

== Collection of essays ==
- Writers Block

== Awards for literature ==
- Sanskriti puraskaram for literature in Indian languages
- Abudabi Sakthi award
- V P Sivakumar memorial keli award
- SBT literary award for short story and Children's literature
- Pune Malayala Sabdam Award
- Altlas Kairali Award
- Ankanam Award
- E.P. Sushama endowment

== Award for journalism ==
- Pandalam Kerala Varma award for best Editorial.
