= Murali Sastry =

Indian material chemist, nanomaterial scientist and college administrator

- Born: 10 June 1959 (age 67); Tamil Nadu, India
- Education: IIT Madras; International Centre for Theoretical Physics; Elettra Sincrotrone Trieste
- Known for: Studies on surfaces, films and materials chemistry
- Awards: 1993 CSIR Young Scientist Award; 2002 CRSI Medal; 2002 Shanti Swarup Bhatnagar Prize; 2003 Materials Research Society of India Medal; 2006 IITM 2006 Distinguished Alumnus Award
- Scientific career
- Fields: Nanomaterials; Hybrid materials
- Workplaces: IITB-Monash Research Academy; Tata Chemicals; National Chemical Laboratory; QAD Global Resource Center; University of Maryland; CNRS, Orsay; Indian National Academy of Engineering; IIT Kanpur; DSM India Innovation Center

Murali Sastry (born 10 June 1959) is an Indian material chemist, nanomaterial scientist and the chief executive officer of the IITB-Monash Research Academy. He is a former chief scientist at Tata Chemicals and a former senior scientist at the National Chemical Laboratory. He is known for his studies on surfaces, films and materials chemistry and is an elected fellow of Maharashtra Academy of Sciences and the Indian Academy of Sciences. The Council of Scientific and Industrial Research, the apex agency of the Government of India for scientific research, awarded him the Shanti Swarup Bhatnagar Prize for Science and Technology, one of the highest Indian science awards, in 2002, for his contributions to chemical sciences.

== Biography ==
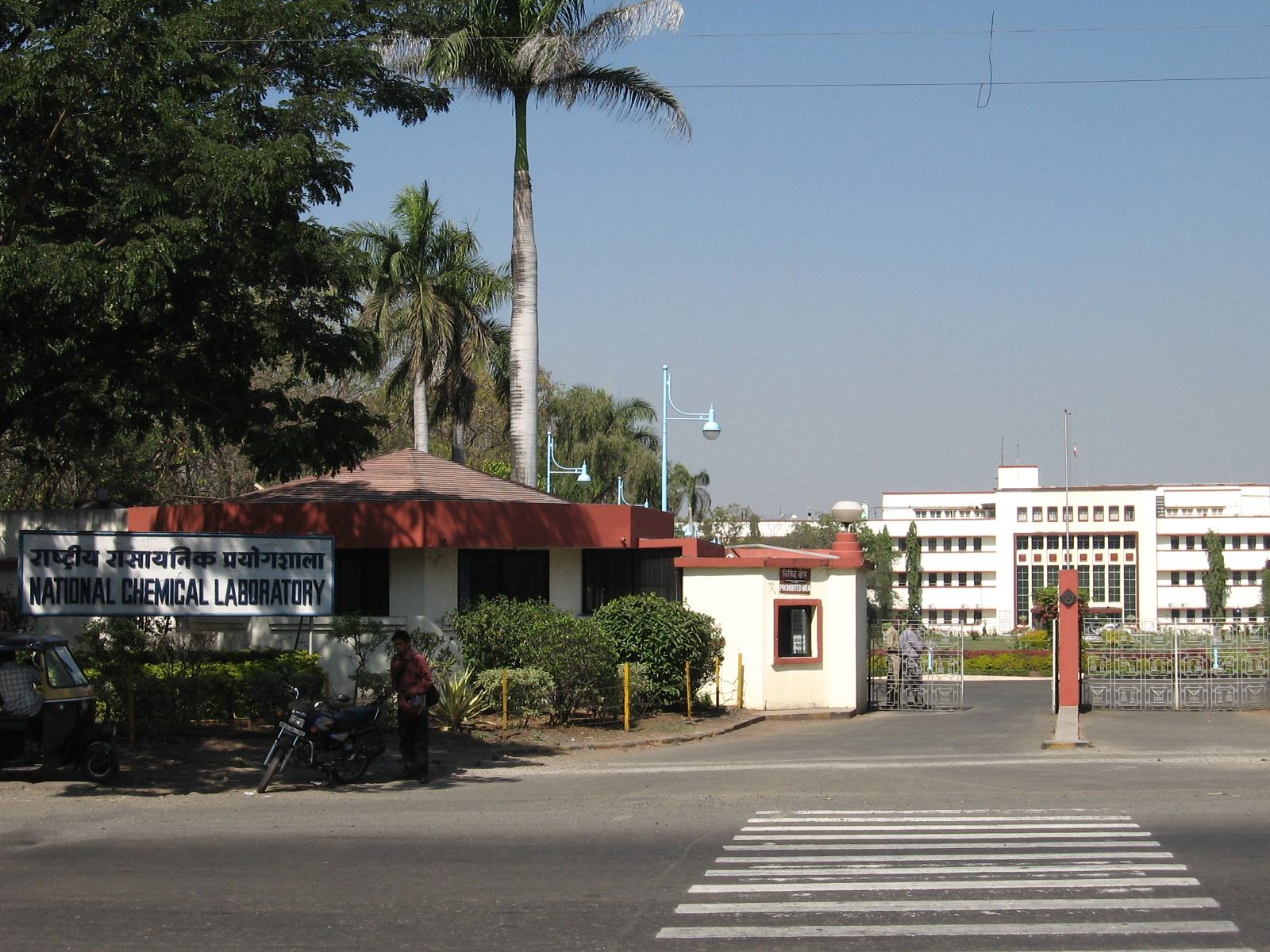
National Chemical Laboratory

Murali Sastry, born on 10 June 1959 in the south Indian state of Tamil Nadu, completed his master's degree in chemistry in 1982 at the Indian Institute of Technology, Madras. He continued at the institute to secure a PhD in thin film technology in 1987 before doing his post-doctoral studies at the International Centre for Theoretical Physics (1988–89) and Elettra Sincrotrone Trieste (1989–91). He joined QAD Global Resource Center in 1997 as a software engineer where he served in such positions as Technical Consultant and Project Manager till his move to the National Chemical Laboratory as a Senior Scientist. In 2005 he shifted to Tata Chemicals as the Chief Innovation Officer and after 6 years of service, he joined DSM India as the director of the Innovation Centre in 2011. When the then chief executive officer of IITB-Monash Research Academy retired in 2015, he was selected for the post and he holds the post till date. He has served as an INAE and C. V. Seshadri chair professor at the Indian Institute of Technology, Kanpur, DAE professor at the Central University, Hyderabad, and as a visiting scientist at the University of Maryland (1998–99) and CNRS, Orsay (2001–03).

== Legacy ==
Sastry's contributions are based on his researches focused on thin films and nano materials, as well as the commercial applications of the technologies he has developed. As the chief scientific officer of Tata Chemicals, he introduced a low-cost water purifier, Swach, which utilized nano-silvers as the filtering agent. He established an innovation centre there which worked on a number of projects based on nanotechnology. It was during his tenure as the CEO of IITB-Monash Research Academy, the institution set up a new headquarters in Mumbai where he oversees inter-disciplinary scientific research with participation from some of the leading Indian and overseas business houses. He has published his research by way of chapters contributed to books authored by others and over 360 peer-reviewed articles. He holds many US and Indian patents; Justia Patents has listed 24 of these. He has also been associated with many governmental and semi-governmental science agencies such as Department of Biotechnology, Department of Science and Technology, Presidential Nanotechnology Committee and the Council of Scientific and Industrial Research as well as a number of science journals.

== Awards and honors ==
Sastry received the CSIR Young Scientist Award in 1993 and the Bronze Medal of the Chemical Research Society of India in 2002. The same year, he was elected as a fellow by the Indian Academy of Sciences. The Council of Scientific and Industrial Research awarded him the Shanti Swarup Bhatnagar Prize, one of the highest Indian science awards, also in 2002. He is also a fellow of the Maharashtra Academy of Sciences and a recipient of the Materials Research Society of India Medal, which he received in 2003. The Indian Institute of Technology, Madras selected him as a Distinguished Alumnus in 2006. He was listed among the world's most cited materials scientists by Elsevier Scopus in 2016.

== See also ==
- Nanotechnology
