= Murali, Arsky District, Republic of Tatarstan =

Rural locality in Arça District, Tatarstan

Coordinates: 56°10′37″N 50°09′52″E

Murali (Russian: Мурали́; Tatar: Мөрәле, romanized: Möräle [mœræˈle]) is a village (selo) in Arsky District of the Republic of Tatarstan, Russia, located on the bank of the Kismes River, 23 kilometers (14 mi) south-east of Arsk, the administrative center of the district. Population: 305 (2000 est.); 315 (1989); all ethnic Tatars. There is a primary school and a club in the village. The main occupation of the population is agriculture and cattle breeding. The village has been known to exist since the times of the Khanate of Kazan.
