= Ramisetti Murali =

Indian social worker and activist

Sri Ramisetti Murali M. S. W. (Nagpur)
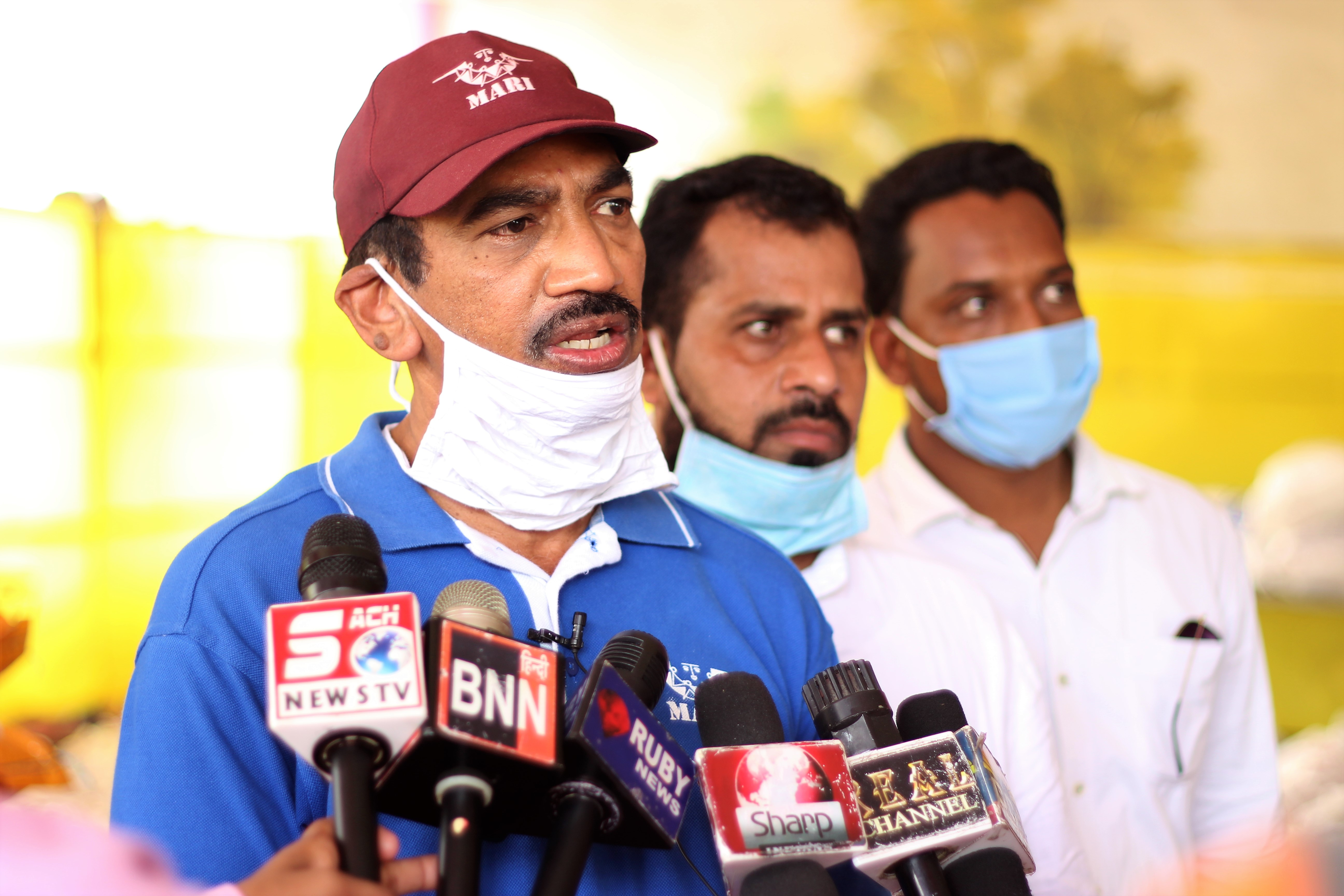
- Ramisetti Murali, Director, MARI, addressing a press conference on 13 June 2020
- Born: 30 July 1963 (age 63); Guntur district (Andhra Pradesh, India)
- Citizenship: Indian
- Occupation: Social worker
- Known for: Environment concerns in South Asia
- Title: Sri
- Board member of: Saciwaters, Secunderabad
- Awards: Certificate of appreciation by Governance and Transparency Fund, United Kingdom

Academic background
- Education: B. S. W. (Andhra), M. S. W. (Nagpur)
- Alma mater: Andhra University, Waltair (Andhra Pradesh), Nagpur University, Nagpur (Maharashtra)

Academic work
- Discipline: Social work
- Sub-discipline: Transboundary water sharing
- Institutions: Warangal, Secunderabad
- Main interests: Water
- Notable ideas: Transboundary issues concerning water sharing

Ramisetti Murali (born 30 July 1963) is an Indian social worker and activist involved in environmental and civil society initiatives comprising water, farming, eradication of child labour, health and nutrition and waste management. Murali presently heads the Freshwater Action Network in South Asia (FANSA), a regional water body of South Asian countries. and is also the founder-Director of Modern Architects for Rural India (MARI) based in Secunderabad.

The reformatory initiatives of Murali enthused many. Patrick Donahue of BRINQ wrote that Murali is among those who can paint his visions of a better world into reality. In 2011, Murali spoke at an All-party parliamentary group chaired by Baroness Kinnock in England on the threats to water resources. Rural development is one of the key focus of Murali's interests and has been proactively participating in community programmes since the past few decades. While Naxalism sought to alleviate peoples suffering through use of force against the State, Murali's approach through Participatory management helped set up schools in rural Warangal much to the chagrin of the State Education officials.

== Career ==
After completing social work studies at Waltair and Nagpur, Murali began to work for the social causes in the 1980s at the Hyderabad-based Centre for Environmental Concerns and followed his call and started Modern Architects for Rural India (MARI) focusing on Warangal region in Telangana.

== Writings ==
- Small Support Big Makeover - Case studies of Saksham project (with K. Suresh, M. Venkanna and Rama Jyothi). Hyderabad: MARI. 2018.
- Formative Research to Develop Appropriate Participatory Approaches towards Water, Sanitation, and Hygiene in Rural Areas (with Depinder Kapur and Nafisa Barot). New Delhi: India WASH Forum. 2016.
- Faecal waste management in smaller cities across South Asia: Getting right the policy and practice (with Shubhagato Dasgupta, Nikhil George and Depinder Kapur). New Delhi: Centre for Policy Research. 2016.
- FANSA's reflections on SACOSAN VI outcomes: 2016. London: End Water Poverty. 2016.
- Leave no one behind - Voices of Women, Adolescent Girls, Elderly and Differently-Abled People and Sanitation Workers (with Archana Patkar). Geneva: WSSCC. 2015.
- Learning and achievements of SWA Global platform and its relevance to achieving Hygiene and Sanitation Development in India. New York: Sanitation and Water for All. 2015.
- SACOSAN V Declaration Commitment Indicators. New Delhi: Government of India, Ministry of Drinking Water and Sanitation. 2015.
- The human right to safe drinking water and sanitation in law and policy - a sourcebook (with Catarina de Albuquerque, Helene Boussard, et al.). Berlin: WASH United. 2012.
- Debt and Deep Well (with D. Venkateshwarlu and K. Srinivas). Warangal: CARE-MARI ICNGO programme. 2000.
