= Gendai =

Gendai (現代, modern) may refer to:

- Gendai, a modern aesthetic movement in haiku
- Gendai budō, Japanese martial arts established after the 1860s
- GameSalad (company), formerly Gendai Games, an American computer software company
- Shūkan Gendai, a Japanese magazine

== See also ==
- Museum of Contemporary Art, Tokyo
