= Murali Chemuturi =

Indian software development consultant

Murali Krishna Chemuturi
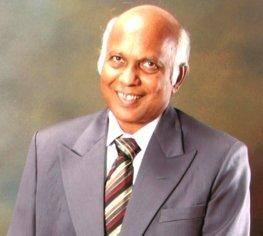
- Born: Chityala, India
- Citizenship: India
- Website: chemuturi.com

Murali Krishna Chemuturi is an Indian software developer.

== Selected works ==
- Chemuturi, Murali (2013). Requirements Engineering and Management for Software Development Projects. New York: Springer. ISBN 978-1-4614-5376-5.
