= Abort =

Abort may refer to:

== Termination of a process or relationship ==
- Abort (computing), to terminate a computer processing or data transfer activity
- Abortion, the termination of pregnancy
  - Late-term abortion at an advanced stage of gestation
  - Abortion debate, ongoing debate surrounding abortion
- Paper abortion (also known as a financial abortion or a statutory abort), the proposed ability of a biological father, before the birth of the child, to opt out of any rights, privileges, and responsibilities toward the child, including financial support
- Go-around or aborted landing, a last-minute decision to cancel an aircraft landing attempt
- In spaceflight, particularly a mode resulting in the return of the spacecraft to Earth:
  - Apollo abort modes
  - Space Shuttle abort modes
  - Soyuz abort modes
  - Orion abort modes

== Arts, entertainment, and media ==
- Abort (album), 1991, by the band Tribe
- Abort (film), a 1970 Norwegian film

== Other uses ==
- Abort, antiquated German for a toilet
