= Escape pod =

Capsule or craft used to evacuate base or vehicle in case of emergency

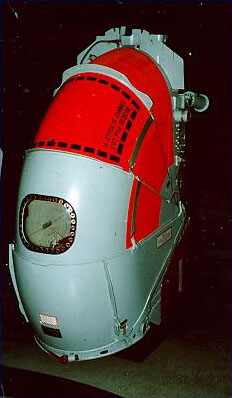
The escape capsule of a Convair B-58 Hustler

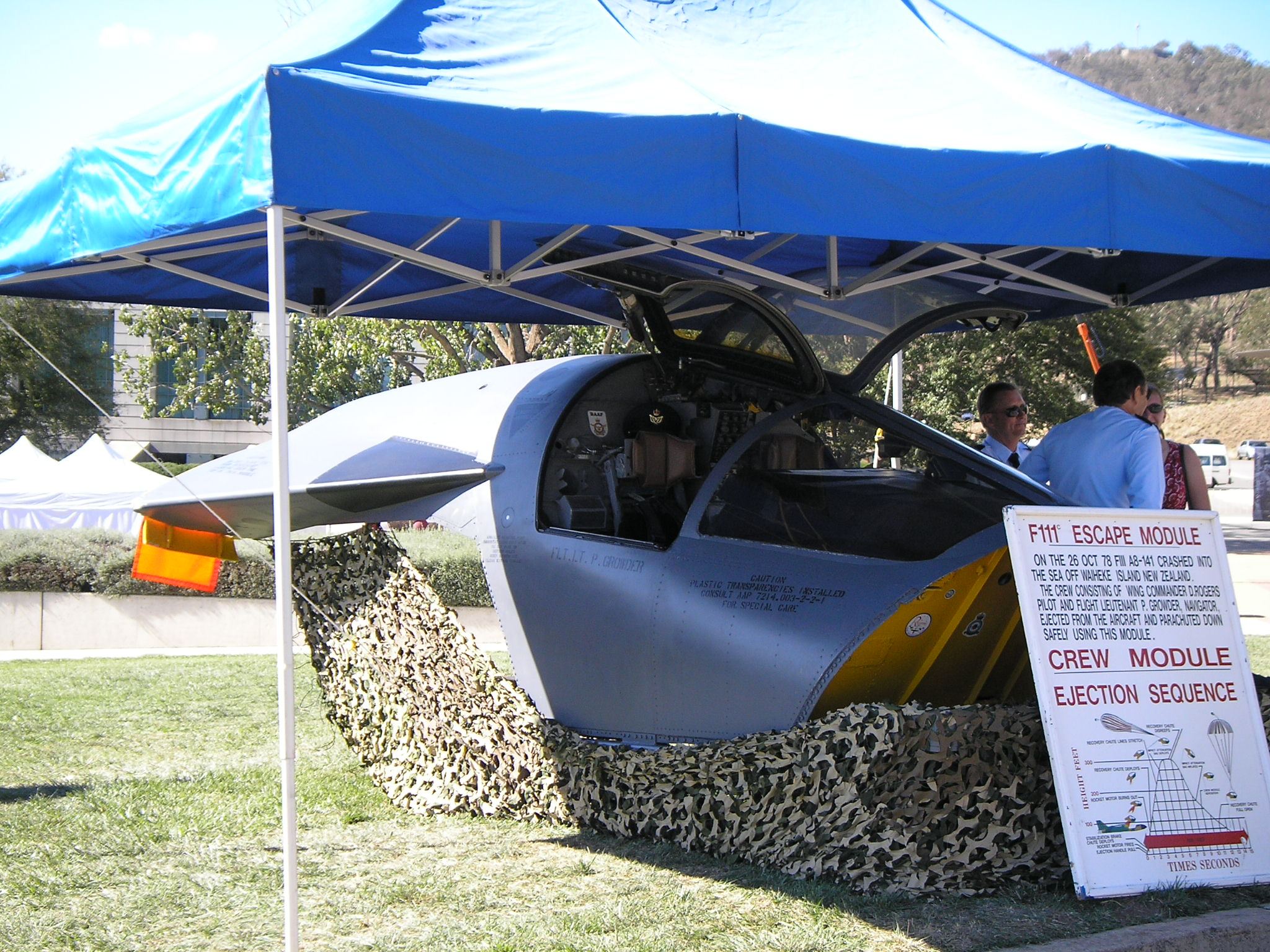
The escape capsule of a Royal Australian Air Force F-111. This capsule saved the lives of two crew members when the aircraft crashed in October 1978. Australian War Memorial, 2007

An escape pod, escape capsule, life capsule or lifepod is a capsule or craft, usually only big enough for one person, used to escape from a vessel in an emergency. An escape ship is a larger, more complete craft also used for the same purpose. Escape pods are commonplace in science fiction but are only used in a few real vehicles.

== Real life ==
- Because they were intended to fly too high and fast for safe use of conventional ejection seats, the Bell X-2, B-58 Hustler, XB-70 Valkyrie, F-111 Aardvark and B‑1A Lancer all used enclosed escape crew capsules of some kind.
  - A similar concept OSCAR (Optimum Survival Containment and Recovery), was intended for the Vought F-8 Crusader.
- The single submarine of the Soviet "Mike"-class, K-278 Komsomolets had an escape capsule, which was jettisoned upon its sinking in 1989. Other Soviet submarines like the Oscar-class are only rumored to have escape capsules. During the sinking of the Kursk, the crew was unable to reach it. Also the Typhoon-class is rumored to have escape pods located near or in the sail. Evidence for this can be found in a German documentary on the Typhoon-class submarine Severstal. The Shishumar class submarine has an IKL-designed integrated escape sphere. The sphere has accommodations for the entire crew with an eight-hour air supply.

== Fiction ==
Escape pods are frequently depicted as being used by large spacecraft in science fiction, for example the Tantive IV in Star Wars, the Axiom in WALL-E, and the vessels of Starfleet in Star Trek. The 1981 film Lifepod and the 1993 TV film of the same name both revolve around such vehicles.

== See also ==
- Lifeboat – Small boat carried on a ship for emergency evacuation
- Escape crew capsule – Aircraft crew escape system
- Launch escape system – System to get the crew to safety if a rocket launch fails
- Apollo abort modes – Plans for mission abort during an Apollo spacecraft launch
- Space Shuttle abort modes – NASA Space Shuttle safety procedures
- Orion abort modes – Launch abort modes used by the Orion spacecraft
- Soyuz abort modes – Soyuz spacecraft emergency crew rescue systems
