= Rescue Chamber =

Rescue Chamber can refer to:

- McCann Rescue Chamber, a device for rescuing submariners from a submarine that is unable to surface
- Mine rescue chamber, an emergency shelter installed in underground environments.

== See also ==
- Escape Room (disambiguation)
- Escape crew capsule
- Escape pod
