= Escape Room (disambiguation) =

An escape room is a type of puzzle game room, which people enter to solve a puzzle to exit the room.

Escape Room may also refer to:

== Film ==
- Escape Room (2017 film), starring Annabelle Stephenson and Elisabeth Hower
- Escape Room (2018 film), an American horror film directed by Peter Dukes and starring Skeet Ulrich
- Escape Room (2019 film), an American horror film directed by Adam Robitel
- Escape Room: Tournament of Champions, a 2021 American psychological horror film sequel to Escape Room (2019 film) directed by Adam Robitel

== Gaming ==
- Escape room video game, a.k.a. escape the room, room escape, escape game, a genre of video game starting in the late 1980s

== Music ==
- "Escape Room", a song by Fromis 9 from their 2022 EP Midnight Guest
- Escape room, a musical genre inspired by trap music identified by Spotify's algorithms

== Television episodes ==
- "Escape Room" (Beavis and Butt-Head), 2022
- "Escape Room" (Not Going Out), 2018

== See also ==
- Emergency exit room
- Escape crew capsule, escape capsule that allows one or more occupants of an aircraft or spacecraft to escape from the craft
- Escape pod, capsule or craft used to escape a vessel in an emergency
- Rescue Chamber (disambiguation)
- Escape (disambiguation)
