= Istres-Le Tubé Air Base =

French Air Force base near Istres, Bouches-du-Rhone, France

Istres-Le Tubé Air Base Base aérienne 125 Istres (BA 125) Advanced Landing Ground (ALG) Y-17

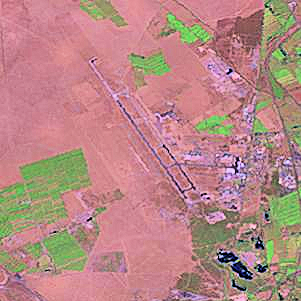
- Landsat 5 satellite image - false color infrared

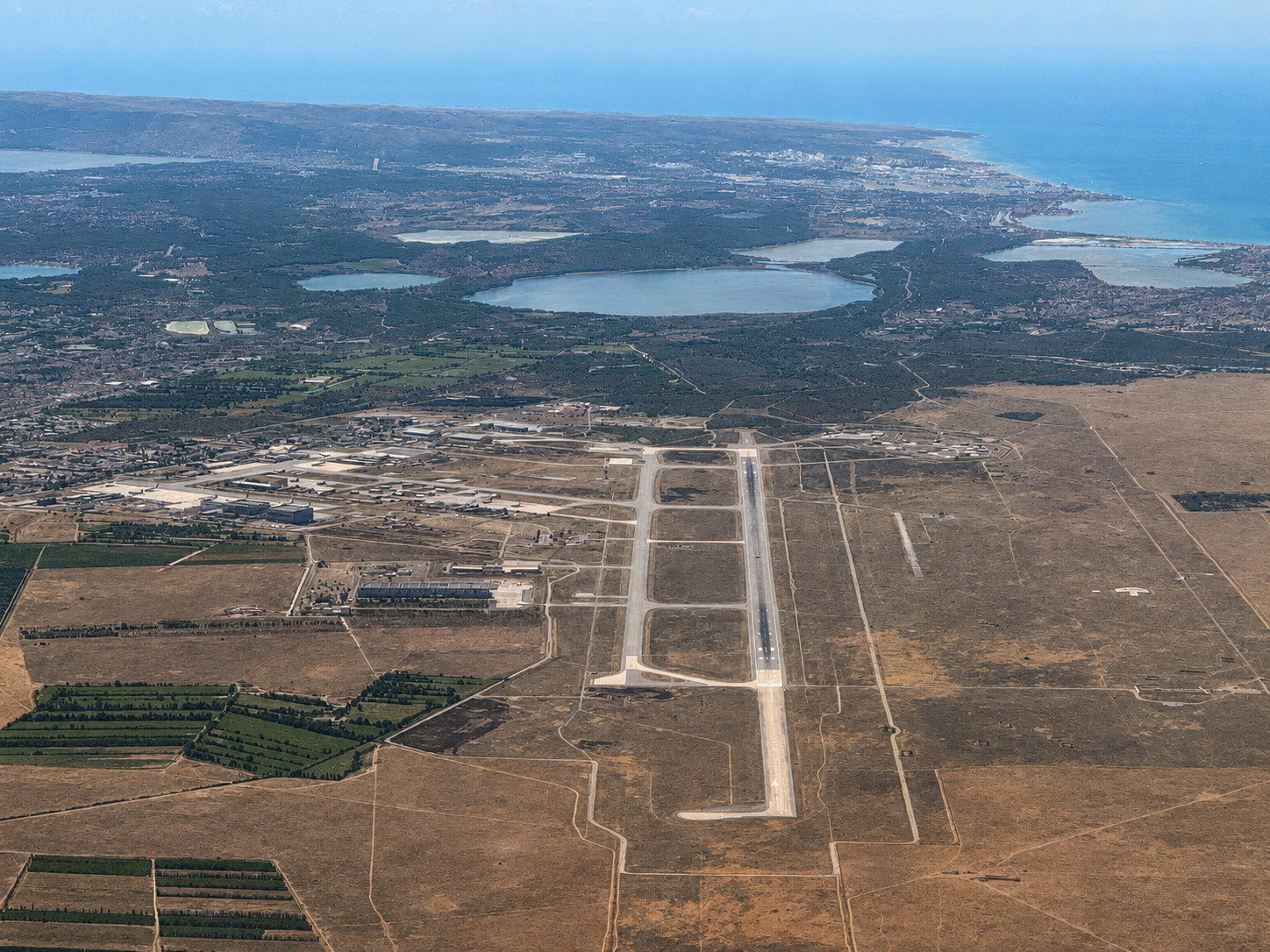
- Aerial view of Istres-Le Tubé Air Base
- IATA: QIE; ICAO: LFMI

Summary
- Airport type: Military
- Owner: Government of France
- Operator: Armée de l'air et de l'espace
- Location: Istres, Bouches-du-Rhône, France
- Elevation AMSL: 162 ft (49 m)
- Coordinates: 43°31′28″N 4°56′30″E

Map
- Location of Istres-Le Tubé Air Base LFMI (France) LFMI (Provence-Alpes-Côte d'Azur)

Runways
| Direction | Length | | Surface |
| Direction | m | ft | Surface |
|---|---|---|---|
| 15/33 | 5,000 | 16,404 | Asphalt |
- Source: DAFIF

Istres-Le Tubé Air Base (French: Base Aérienne 125 or BA 125) is a large multi-role tasked French Air and Space Force base located near Istres, northwest of Marseille, France. The airport facilities are also known as Istres - Le Tubé (ICAO airport code: LFMI).

== Operational units and uses ==
=== French Air and Space Force ===
The user of the base is the French Air and Space Force with several operational units on the base, including:

- Escadron de Ravitaillement en Vol et de Transport Stratégiques 1/31 Bretagne
- Escadron de Ravitaillement en Vol et de Transport Stratégiques 2/31 Esterel
- Escadron de Transformation Phénix (ETP) 3/31 Landes
- Escadron de Soutien Technique Aéronautique 15/31 Camargue
- DAMS 11.004 (Dépôt atelier de munitions spéciales) or Special ammunition storage, responsible for the hardened storage of the nuclear mid-range Air-Sol Moyenne Portée ASMP-A missiles to be used by fighter squadron 2/4 in its deterrent role.
- Air defence squadron 01.950 responsible for the base air defense.
- 25th Air Engineer Regiment
- Guard detachment (Fusiliers Commandos de l'Air) responsible for the base security and ground defences.

=== Other uses ===
The base also hosts a helicopter squadron and a large repair and training facility. In addition, it also includes EPNER (École du Personnel Navigant d’Essais et de Réception); test facilities for DGA Essais en vol, Dassault Aviation, SNECMA, Thales and some aeronautical units of the French Navy. More than 5,000 personnel work on the base.

Secondary users occasionally include the United States Air Force (USAF), during Allied operations engaging United States and France. During Operation Allied Force, USAF Boeing KC-135 Stratotankers and Lockheed U-2s operated out of the base. Istres was the home of U-2 detachment OL-FR (Operating Location-FRance). Istres was also designated by NASA as a contingency landing site for the Space Shuttle in the case of a Transoceanic Abort Landing (TAL). The base's runway is 3,750 metres (12,300 ft) long and 60 metres (200 ft) wide. An additional overrun area 1,200 metres (3,900 ft) long was built for Airbus Industries in 1992. It has the same characteristics as the runway, making it the longest runway in Western Europe and thus suited to Shuttle landings.

== World War II ==
Built prior to World War II, Istres Air Base was first used by the French Air Force during the early part of the war, and after the 1940 Battle of France and the June Armistice with Nazi Germany, became part of the limited (French: Armée de l'Air de Vichy) air force of the Vichy Government. It was attacked on several missions by Allied bombers based in England while under German control after November 1942. It was seized by Allied forces during Operation Dragoon, the Invasion of Southern France in August 1944 and was repaired and placed into operational use by the United States Army Air Forces XII Engineer Command, being turned over to Twelfth Air Force on 27 August 1944.

The airfield was designated by the Americans as Istres/Le Tubé Airfield or Advanced Landing Ground Y-17. It was also given the AAF designation of USAAF Station 196. Twelfth Air Force initially assigned the 324th Fighter Group to the airfield on 2 September, with Republic P-47 Thunderbolts. However the 324th only remained a few days before moving forward to Ambérieu on 6 September.

The main USAAF use of Istres was by the 64th Troop Carrier Group, which operated Douglas C-47 Skytrain transports from the airfield from September to November 1944. When the combat units moved north into eastern France, Istres was used by Air Transport Command as a transshipment point for supplies and Allied personnel, being administratively controlled by the 1411th Army Air Force Base Unit.

With the end of the war, the Americans used Istres as a staging point between Occupied Germany and Morocco for air transport of personnel back to the United States. It was returned to full French control in October 1945.

Sometime after World War II, until May 1958, Base Aérienne 125 was host to the Royal Air Force Liaison Party, that serviced transient British and Commonwealth military aircraft staging to and from the United Kingdom. In May 1958, the Royal Air Force Liaison Party, moved to Base Aérienne 115 Orange-Caritat where it continued into the early 1960s.

== Incidents ==
On 31 March 1992, Trans-Air Service Flight 671, a Boeing 707, made an emergency landing at Istres after engines 3 and 4 had separated from the wing in turbulence at 35,000 feet (11,000 m). The aircraft performed a flapless, downwind landing with a touch-down speed of nearly 200 knots (370 km/h; 230 mph) and the right wing on fire from the pouring fuel. The gear failed and the aircraft slid off the far end of the runway, but the crew of five survived and the cargo was saved. The incident brought to light severe deficiencies in Kabo Air's operations — the aircraft had passed mandatory maintenance and was overloaded.

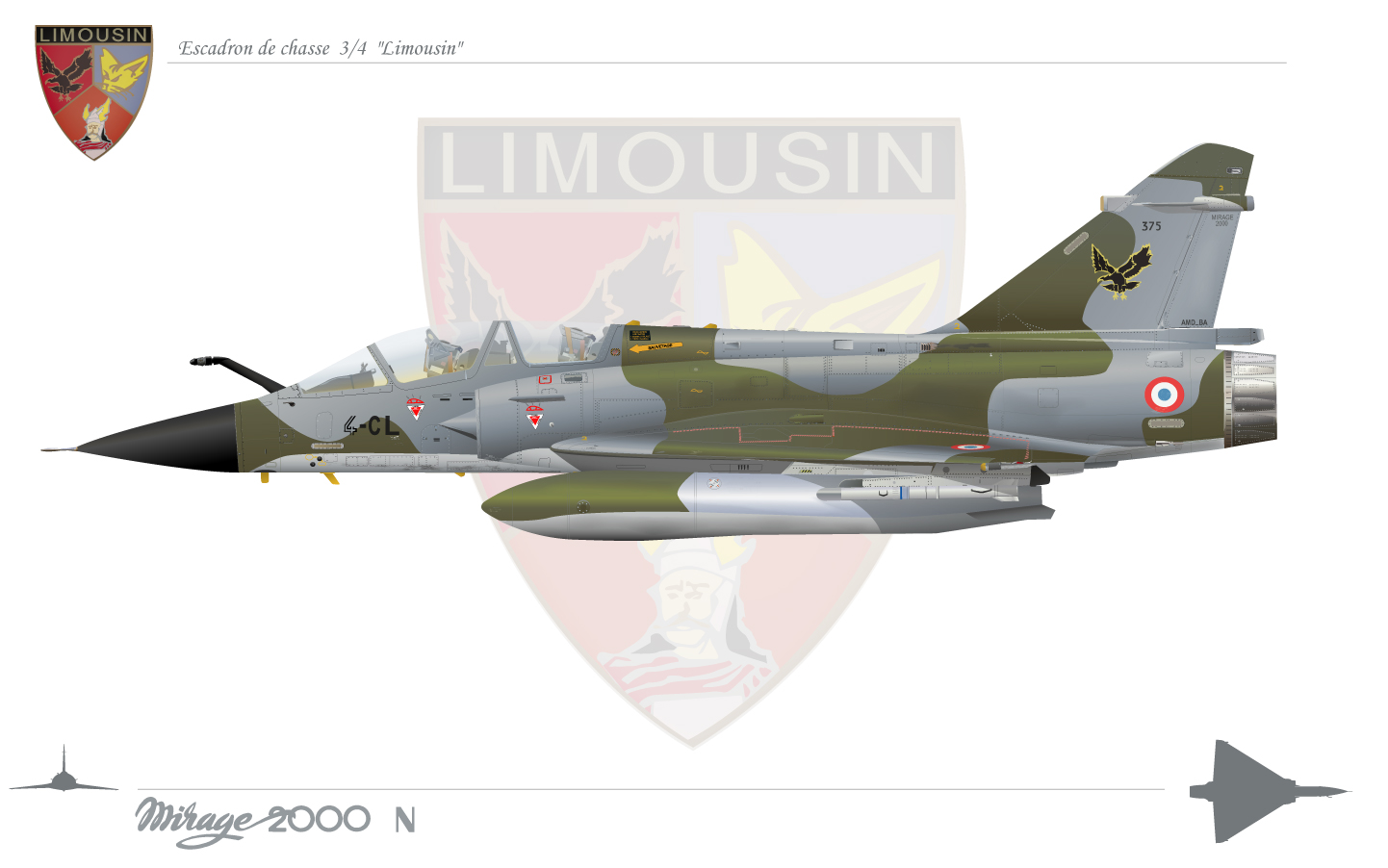
Mirage 2000 "escadron Limousin"

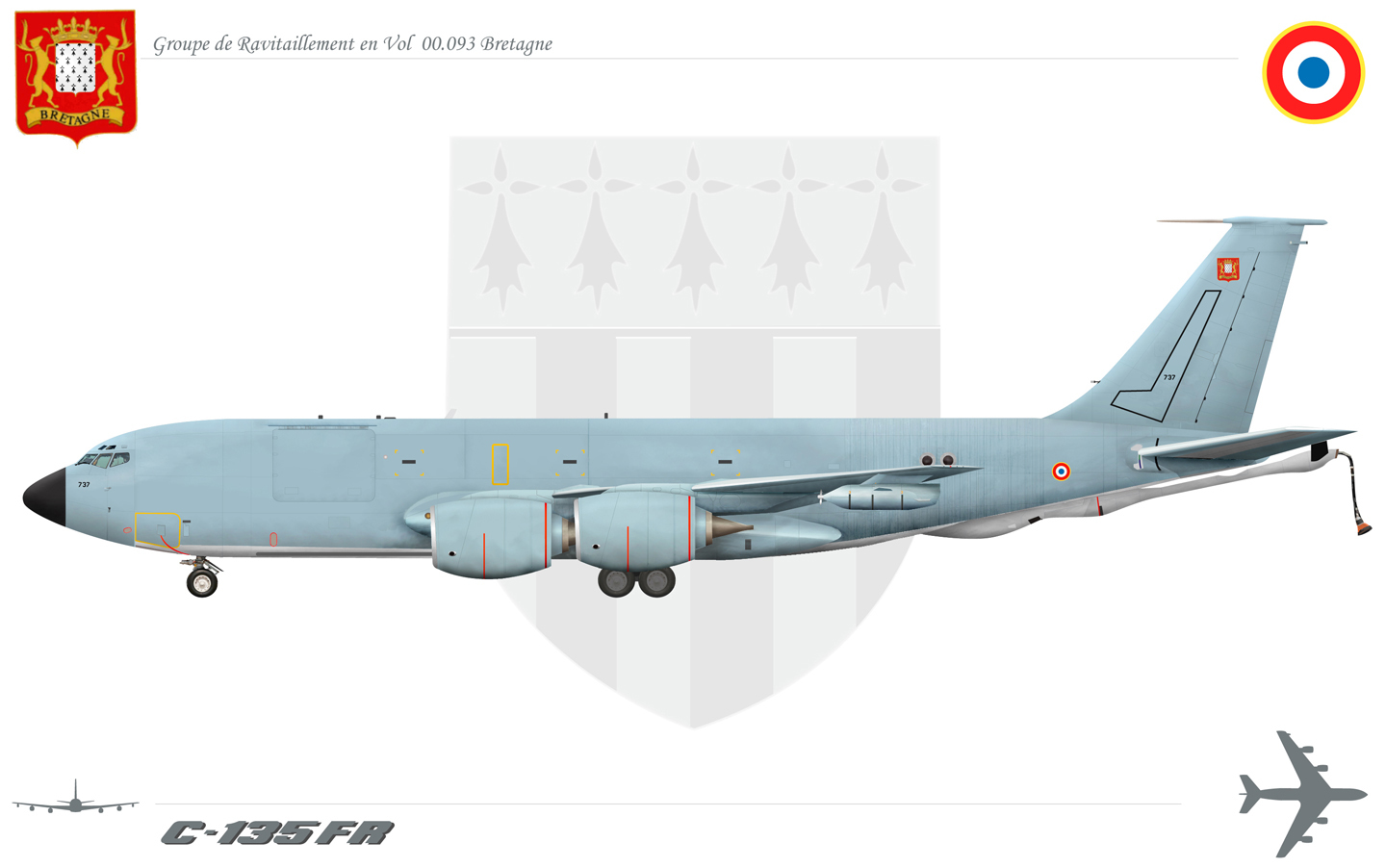
C135FR "GRV 093 Bretagne"

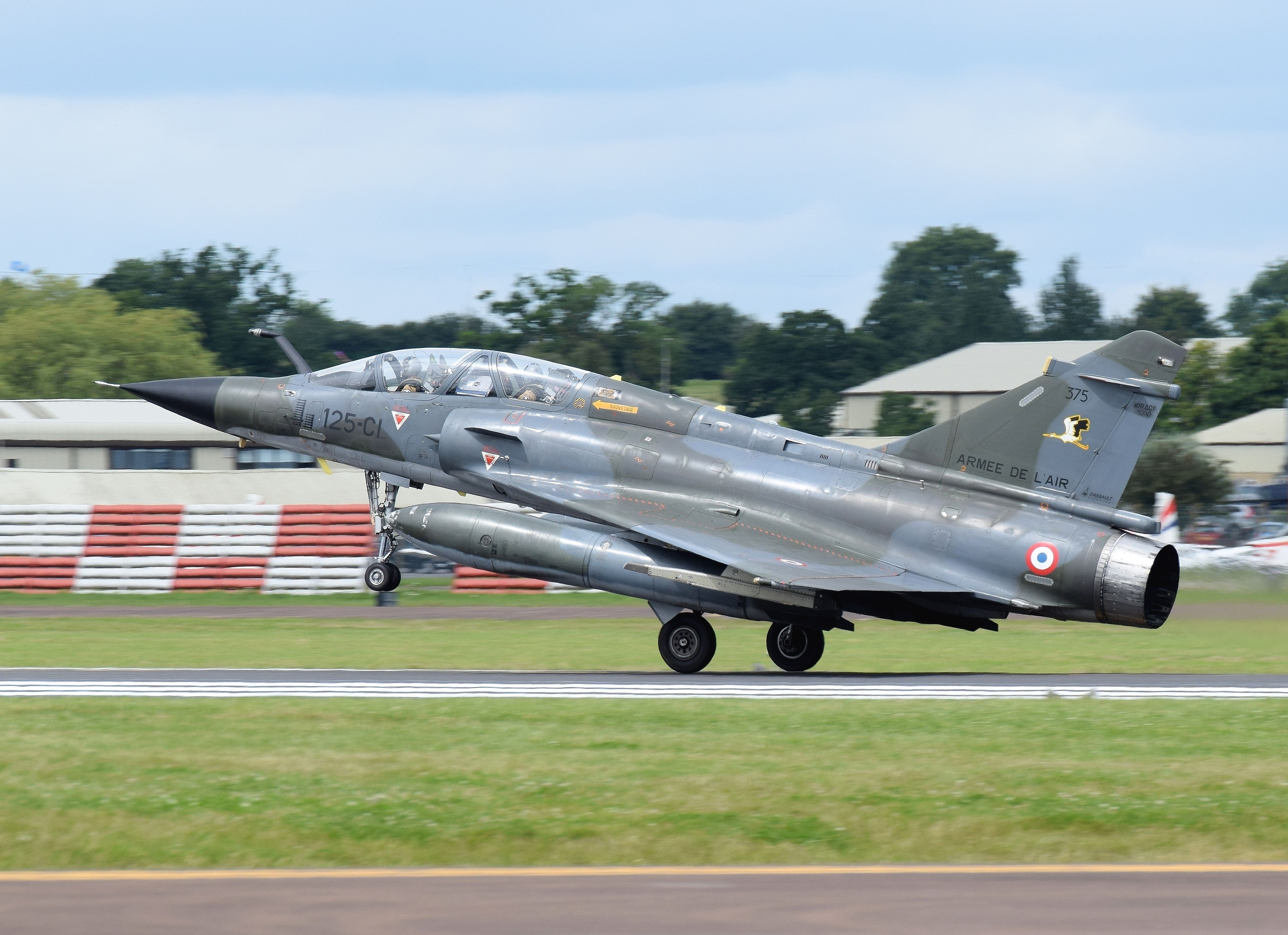
Mirage 2000N based at Istres arrives at the 2016 RIAT, England

== See also ==
- Advanced Landing Ground
