= Escadron de Ravitaillement en Vol et de Transport Stratégiques 2/31 Esterel =

Strategic Air Refueling and Transport Squadron 2/31 Esterel
- Escadron de Ravitaillement en Vol et de Transport Stratégiques 2/31 Esterel
- Country: France
- Branch: Armée de l'air et de l'espace
- Type: Aerial refueling
- Role: Strategic Air Refueling and Transport
- Garrison/HQ: Istres-Le Tubé Air Base

Aircraft flown
- Tanker: Airbus A330 Phénix

Escadron de Ravitaillement en Vol et de Transport Stratégiques 2/31 Esterel is a French Air and Space Force (Armée de l'air et de l'espace) Strategic Air Refueling and Transport Squadron located at Istres-Le Tubé Air Base, Bouches-du-Rhône, France which operates the Airbus A330 Phénix.

== See also ==
- List of French Air and Space Force aircraft squadrons
