= Escape crew capsule =

Aircraft crew escape system

External videos
- F-111 A/B Crew Module Escape System
- F-111 Crew Module Escape System: Ejection Recovery and Landing

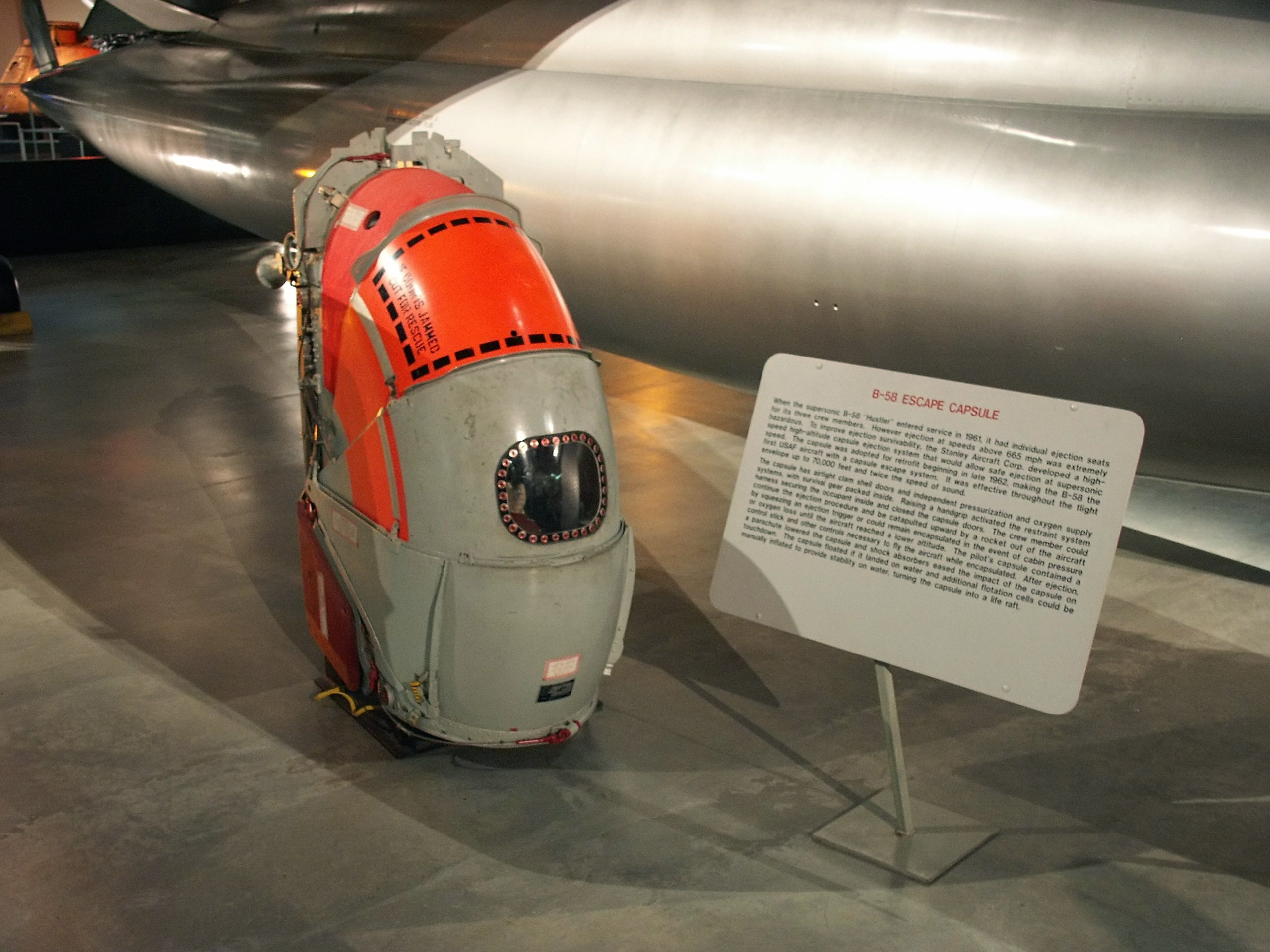
Crewmember escape capsule from a B-58 Hustler

An escape crew capsule is an escape capsule that allows one or more occupants of an aircraft or spacecraft to escape from the craft while it is subjected to extreme conditions, such as high speed or altitude. The occupant remains encapsulated and protected until such time as the external environment is suitable for direct exposure or the capsule reaches the ground.

== Escape types ==
There are two ways to do this:

- Ejecting individual crew capsules (one for each pilot/crew member) or "capsule ejection"
- Ejecting the entire crew cabin, or "cabin ejection"

Four U.S. military aircraft have had escape crew capsules:

- The Convair B-58 Hustler Mach 2 bomber had individual encapsulated seats. The B-58's capsule had a control stick, a bottle of oxygen, and a drogue chute.
- The North American XB-70 Valkyrie Mach 3 bomber prototype had individual encapsulated seats. A 1966 mid-air collision proved the system only partially adequate, with one pilot killed when his seat did not retract into its capsule, and the second pilot injured when the capsule shell closed on his arm (delaying full closure) and the capsule's manually activated airbag did not deploy for landing.
- The General Dynamics F-111 Aardvark used cabin ejection, where both side-by-side seats were in a single 3000 lb (1360 kg) capsule.
- Three of the four Rockwell B-1A prototypes also used cabin ejection. They had a single capsule "roughly the size of a mini-van" for all four crew members.

== Design and development ==
"Escape and Survive" (1960) Official USAF B-58 Hustler crew ejection and escape mechanism information film reel.

Pioneering developments in jettisonable-cockpit style escape capsule systems occurred in Nazi Germany, by both Heinkel Flugzeugwerke and by the Deutsche Forschungsanstalt für Segelflug (German Institute for Glider Research). Heinkel Flugzeugwerke built the first ejection-seat-equipped combat aircraft, the Heinkel He 219. Deutsche Forschungsanstalt für Segelflug flew the Heinkel He 176 rocket plane (in 1939), and the DFS 228 research aircraft, both of which had a jettisonable nose.

The British design for a supersonic test aircraft Miles M.52 of necessity had a jettisonable pilot capsule at the front of the aircraft. The aircraft progressed no further than a nearly complete airframe before cancellation in 1946.

The first American attempt to design such an escape capsule was for the U.S. Navy F4D Skyray. It was tested in 1951-52 but was never installed in the aircraft. The Bell X-2, designed for flight in excess of Mach 3, could jettison the cockpit, though the pilot would still have to jump out and descend under his own parachute. The first production aircraft with an escape crew capsule was the Mach 2 B-58 Hustler. It was developed by the Stanley Aviation Company for Convair. The capsule was pressurized, sheltered the pilot from the airstream, and contained food and survival supplies. During testing of the "Stanley Capsule" in 1962, a bear became the first living creature to survive a supersonic ejection.

The Mach 3 XB-70's two crew escape capsules did not work well the only time they were needed. On June 8, 1966, XB-70 airframe AV/2 was involved in a mid-air crash with an F-104 Starfighter. Maj. Carl Cross's seat was unable to retract backwards into the escape capsule due to high-g-forces as the plane spiraled downwards. He died in the crash. Maj. Al White's seat did retract but his elbow protruded from the capsule and blocked the closing clamshell doors. He struggled to free his trapped elbow. As soon as he freed the doors, he was ejected from the plane and descended by parachute as planned. Due to pain and confusion, White failed to trigger the manually activated airbag that would normally cushion the capsule upon landing. When the capsule hit the ground, White was subjected to an estimated 33 to 44 g (320 to 430 m/s²). He received serious injuries, but nevertheless survived.

On December 8, 1964 at Bunker Hill AFB, a B-58 navigator, Manuel "Rocky" Cervantes, ejected in his escape capsule after his aircraft was blown off an icy runway by another jet in front of him, the plane catching fire in the resulting crash, burning and damaging five nuclear warheads. the other two crew members on the plane safely abandoned the aircraft with only minor injuries. The capsule landed 548 ft (167 m) from the bomber; he did not survive.

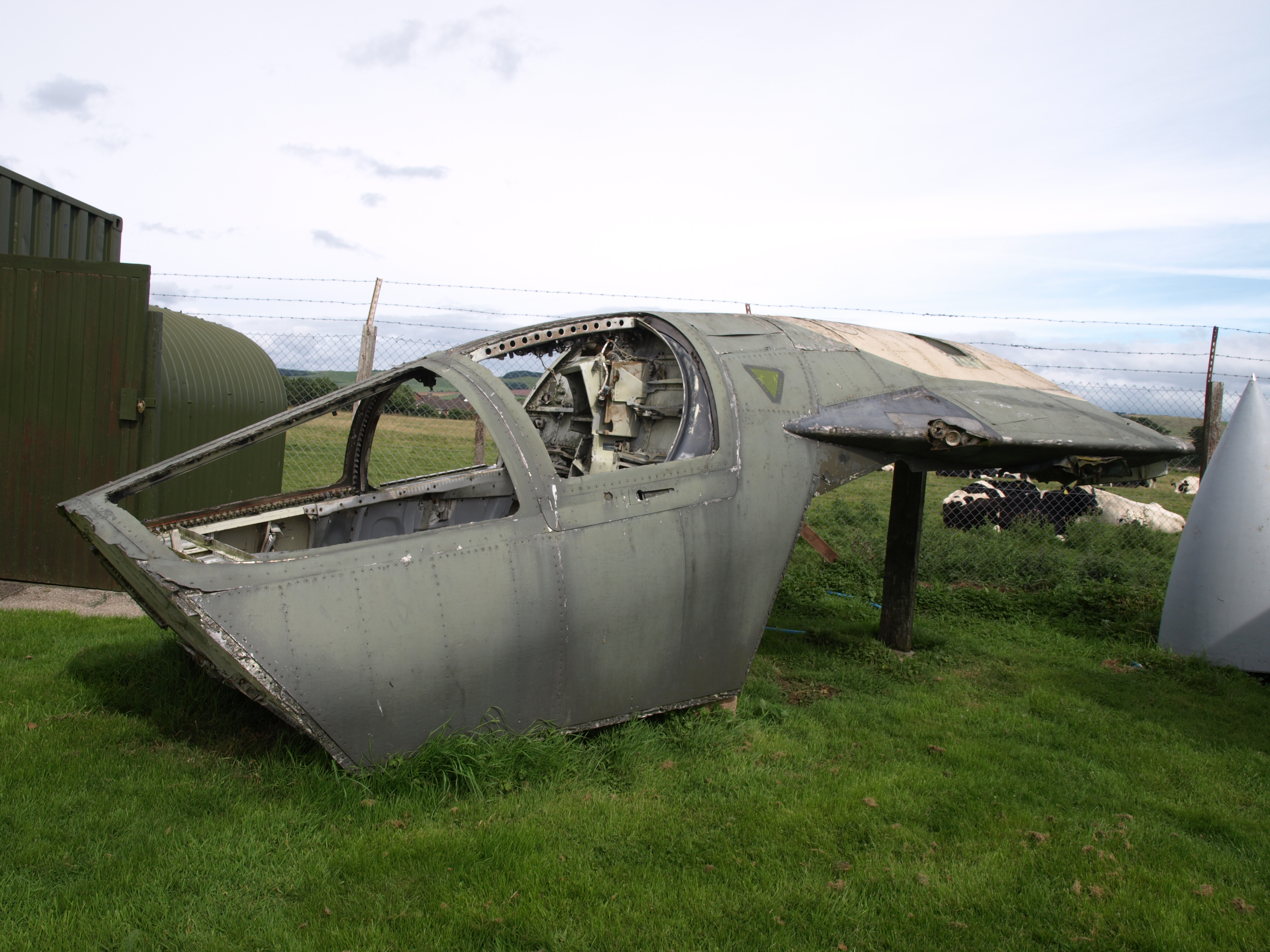
Escape capsule from F-111E

In the 1960s and 1970s, the F-111 and B-1A introduced the method of jettisoning the entire cockpit as a means of crew escape. The crew remains strapped in the cabin, unencumbered by a parachute harness, while 27,000 lbf (120 kN) of thrust from rockets accelerates the module away from the rest of the aircraft. A single, large parachute retards the descent of the capsule. On landing, an airbag system cushions the impact. In the event of a water landing the airbag acts as a flotation device. Additional airbags could be activated to right the capsule in the event of a water landing (similar to the Apollo Command Module), or an additional airbag could be selected for auxiliary flotation. With a movement of a pin at the base of the pilot's control stick, a bilge pump could be activated and extra air pumped into the airbags. For the F-111 escape capsule, following a successful landing on land or water, it could serve as a survival shelter for the crew until a rescue could be mounted.

Three of the four B-1A prototypes featured a single crew escape capsule for the crew members. For the fourth prototype and for the B-1B, this was changed to use conventional ejection seats. One source gives the reason "due to concerns about servicing the pyrotechnical components of the system," while another says this was done "to save cost and weight." On August 29, 1984, B-1A prototype #2 crashed and the capsule was ejected at low altitude. The parachute deployed improperly and one of the three crew died.

== Ejection seats vs. escape crew capsules ==
Kelly Johnson, founder of Lockheed Skunk Works, and developer of the U-2 and SR-71 Blackbird family of spy planes, commented on escape crew capsules when discussing development of the YF-12A (Blackbird) ejection seat: "We set ourselves a very high goal in providing crew escape systems. We were determined to develop a system good for zero escape velocity on the ground and through the complete flight spectrum, having speeds above Mach 3 at 100,000 feet. We did achieve our design goals.... I have never been convinced that a capsule ejection is required for anything other than high velocity re-entry from outer space. Our escape system in a very important sense really provides a capsule, which is the pressure suit, which is surely capable of meeting the speeds and temperatures likely to be encountered in the near future of manned aircraft." Rather than using escape capsules, SR-71 and U-2 pilots wore full pressure suits for high-altitude ejections. The suits were also heat-resistant so that SR-71 pilots could survive the high temperatures generated from a Mach 3 ejection.

== See also ==
- Index of aviation articles
- Escape pod
- Launch escape system
- Personal Rescue Enclosure
- Space Shuttle abort modes
