= Orion abort modes =

Launch abort modes used by the Orion spacecraft

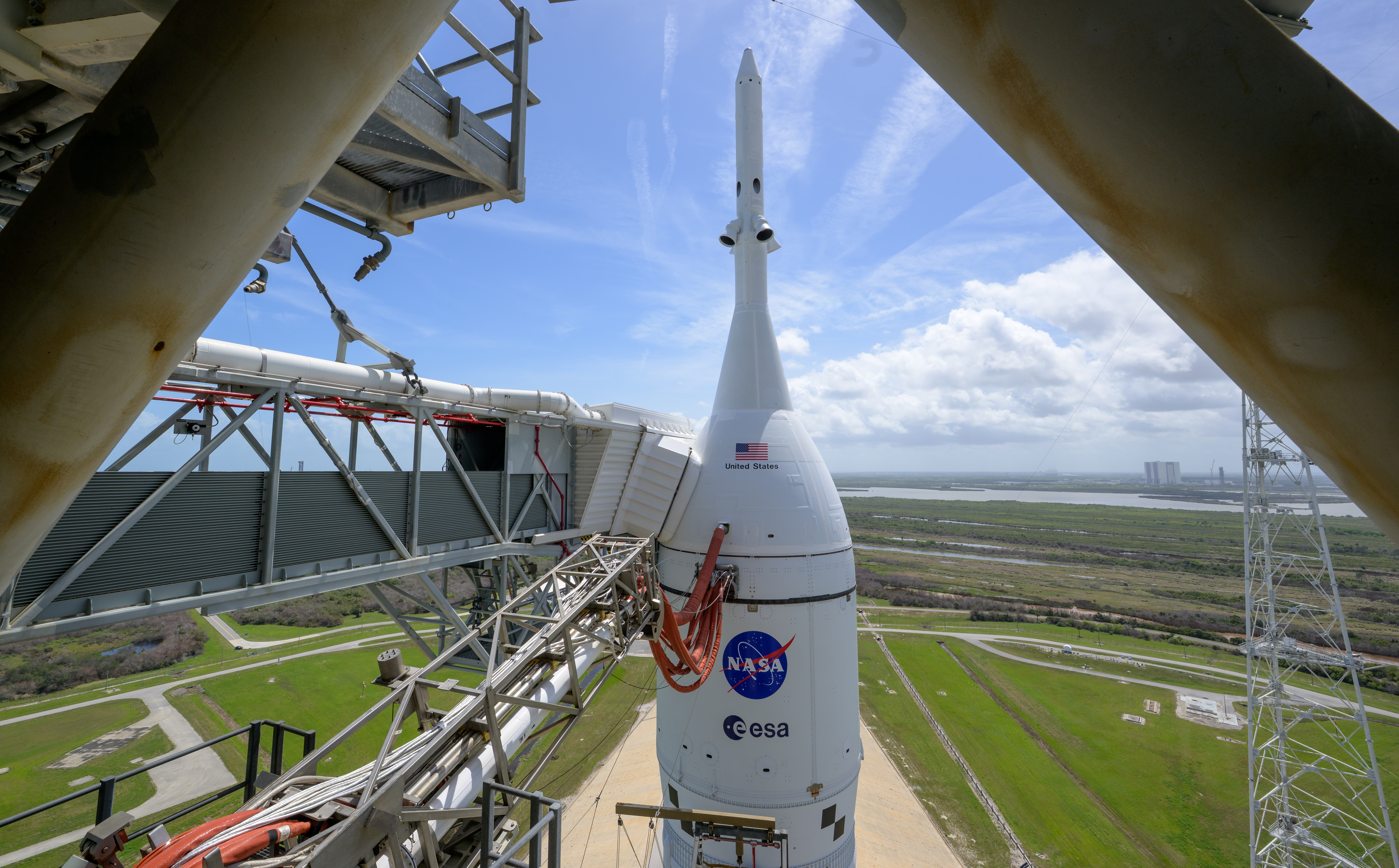
The launch abort system (LAS) of Artemis II.

The Orion Multi-Purpose Crew Vehicle (Orion MPCV) is equipped with a launch escape system, also known as a launch abort system (LAS). Orion has several abort modes. Some of these may not use the LAS itself, but would use the second stage of the SLS, or even the Orion vehicle's own propulsion system (the Aerojet AJ10 engine) instead.

== Modes ==
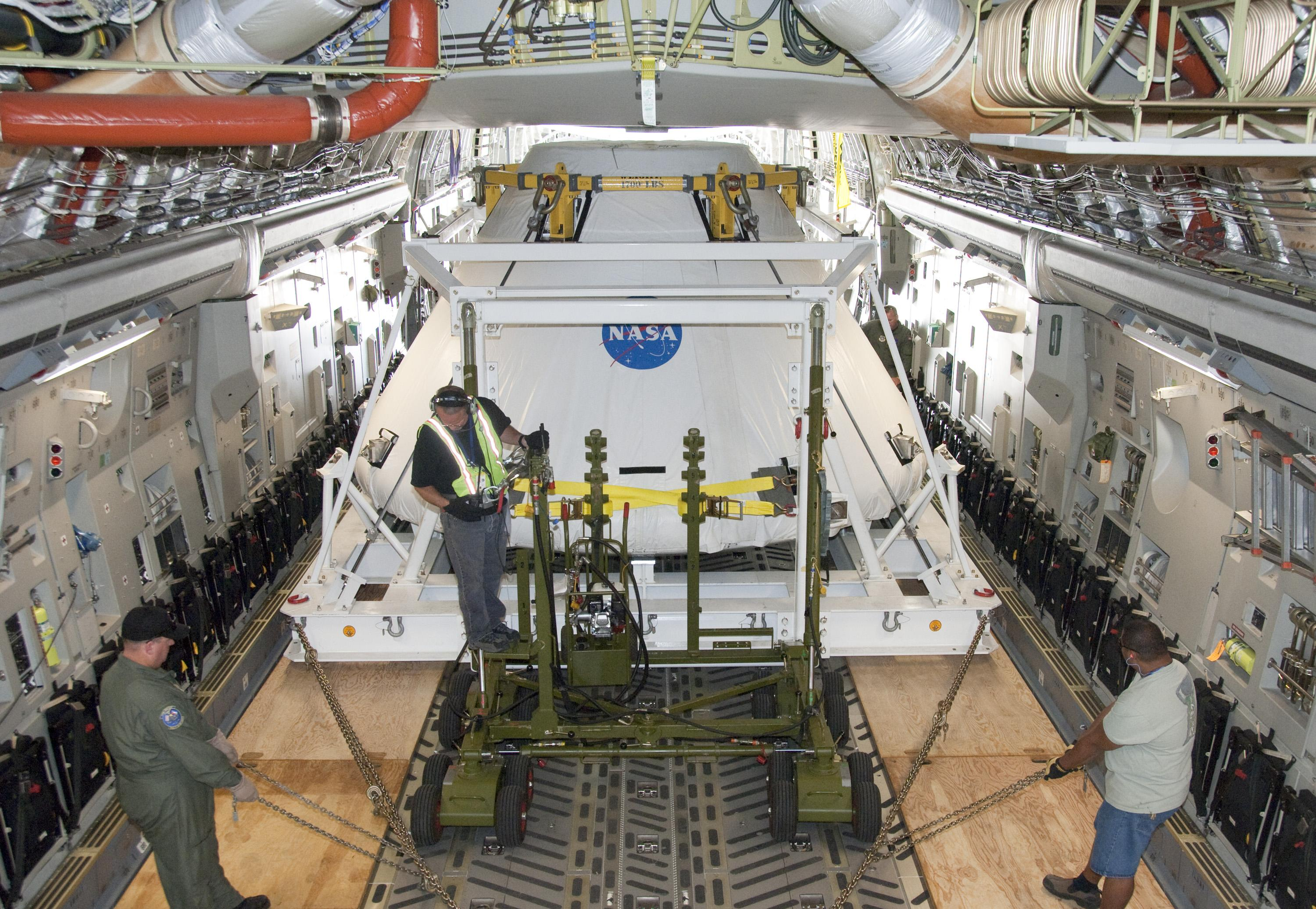
Technicians position an Orion flight test crew module to be airlifted. This module was planned to be used for a launch abort system pad-abort flight test.

The method of abort, either using the LAS or the second stage of the Space Launch System (SLS) booster, depends on how far into the flight the spacecraft and crew are traveling.

=== Prelaunch ===
NASA has acquired several MRAPs to station near the launch pad, should there be time for the crew to evacuate the vehicle. One will be occupied by emergency rescue personnel, while the other will stand empty behind a blast shelter. Pad emergency egress enables astronauts and engineers to quickly escape the perimeter of the rocket. Both zip-lines and roller coasters were at one time studied for this purpose.

=== Mode one ===
During the first 120 seconds of flight, up to the jettisoning of the solid-fueled boosters at 300,000 feet (91 km), the Orion crew module (CM) will separate from the rest of the rocket propelled by the LAS. Unlike the Apollo Launch Escape System, which used a pair of canards and the weight of the spacecraft to flip the vehicle over for landing, the Orion LAS has a set of steering rockets that will steer the spacecraft away from the malfunctioning SLS, as well as prepare the spacecraft for both separation and splashdown. The tower will then be jettisoned 14 seconds later and the hypergolic fuel on the Orion CM would be automatically released at a pre-determined altitude.

=== Mode two ===
After the LAS is jettisoned, the Orion will separate as a whole from the SLS and either use its large AJ-10 engine or smaller control engines to maneuver from the rocket. Similar to a Space Shuttle trans-Atlantic (TAL) abort profile, the Orion will use the AJ-10 engine to propel the spacecraft to a desired separation point, in which then the Orion CM would land in either western Spain or Morocco on "due east" (i.e., lunar) flights, or in Ireland or the United Kingdom on ISS-bound flights. A splashdown in the eastern Atlantic Ocean would only be a contingency.

=== Mode three ===
The SLS would propel the Orion into an initial orbit, upon which the spacecraft will immediately separate, and then perform a retrofire that will allow the Orion CM to splashdown in the Pacific Ocean off the U.S. West Coast, or make a ground landing at either Edwards Air Force Base in California or White Sands Space Harbor in New Mexico. This is similar in profile to the Shuttle's abort once around (AOA) profile.

=== Mode four ===
If the SLS suffers less-than-ideal performance during the initial orbit insertion, it can be restarted 45 minutes later to place the Orion into a less than ideal orbit that can be corrected with the on-board propellant reserves later in the flight. This is similar to the Shuttle's Abort To Orbit (ATO) profile, but depending upon the stable orbit reached, it may require NASA to end the mission with a landing at either Edwards or White Sands within a 24-hour period.

== See also ==
- Space Shuttle abort modes
- Apollo abort modes
- Soyuz abort modes
