= Soyuz abort modes =

Soyuz spacecraft emergency crew rescue systems

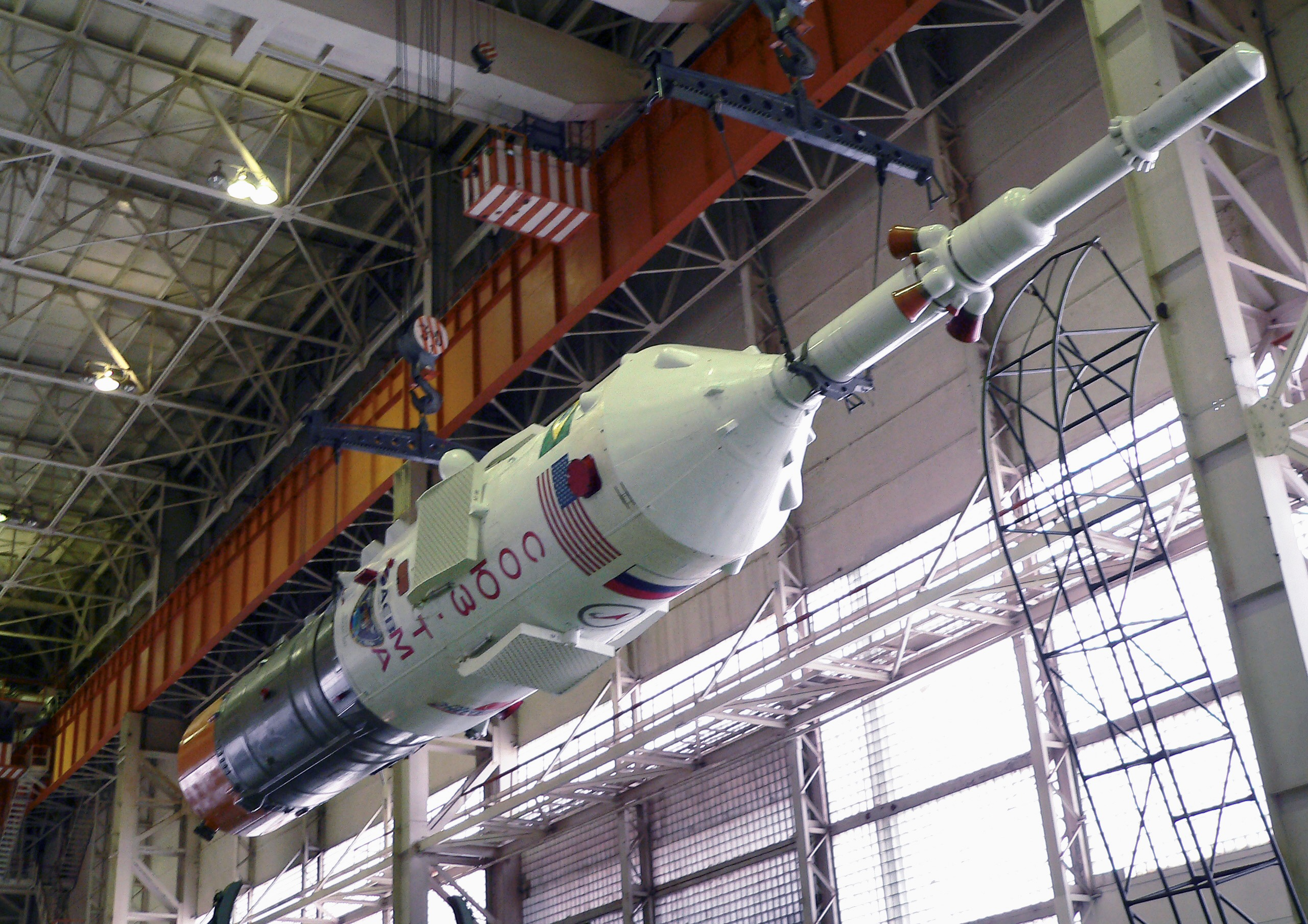
The capsule and escape system of the Soyuz TMA-8 mission during assembly

In the event of catastrophic failure, the Soyuz spacecraft has a series of automated and semi-automated abort modes (Rus. Система аварийного спасения (САС)) (literally - System for Emergency Rescue (SER)) to rescue the crew. The abort systems have been refined since the first piloted flights and all abort scenarios for the Soyuz MS are expected to be survivable for the crew.

== Launch abort modes ==
The Soyuz abort systems are especially complicated because of the modular design of the vehicle; only the middle descent module is designed to survive reentry, so in an emergency, the orbital module and the descent module must be separated together (sometimes with the service module also attached) before the descent module can be separated and orient itself for reentry. Other Soviet spacecraft, like the TKS, attempted similar modular designs with a hatch through the heat shield to resolve this issue. The modular design also means that the Soyuz capsule is contained within a payload fairing for much of the flight and removing the fairing without collision in an emergency was another difficult issue that needed to be addressed.

=== Jettisonable emergency escape head section ===
The Soyuz pad abort procedure. The Image shows from left to right: 1) The firing of the SAS carrying the orbital module, descent module and a portion of the payload fairing from the launch vehicle 2) The separation of the descent module from the rest of the assembly 3) The deployment of parachutes and separation of heat shield 4) The firing of landing engines

The primary abort system for use early in the flight is the Jettisonable Emergency Escape Head Section, known by its Russian abbreviation OGB SAS or just SAS. It is a launch escape system designed by a team from OKB-1 under Sergei Korolev's leadership. The main SAS is a single solid rocket booster with several nozzles to control attitude, placed on top of the Soyuz capsule.

The SAS can be used to separate the Soyuz capsule from the launch vehicle up to about two and a half minutes into powered flight. The launch escape system can be triggered by onboard computers or by radio communication from ground crews. The onboard computers use instruments to detect several possible failures including premature separation of stages, loss of pressure in combustion chambers, and loss of control of the launch vehicle. Once triggered, struts are deployed to secure the descent module to the orbital module until after the escape motors are burnt out and jettisoned. After this, the descent module is separated, its heat shield is jettisoned, and its parachutes are deployed.

Beginning with the Apollo-Soyuz Test Project, the Soyuz spacecraft also has a secondary set of four rocket motors at the top of the fairing that can propel the escape head section away from the rocket during the period between the jettisoning of the SAS at T+115s until fairing deployment at T+157s. In contrast to the SAS these rockets only move the escape head section a small distance away from the rocket, as at these altitudes there is enough time for the landing system to deploy.

=== Other abort procedures ===
In early Soyuz models, there were two abort modes in the time ranging from the ejection of the launch escape system until orbit. One called for separation of only the upper two modules and a controlled descent and could be initiated before about T+522s, the other separated all three and underwent a ballistic descent after T+522.

Unlike the Space Shuttle, Soyuz cannot abort-to-orbit because its third stage has only a single engine and does not carry the reserve fuel necessary to achieve orbit with reduced thrust at a lower stage.

== Reliability ==
An analysis of the overall reliability of the Soyuz capsule was published in the years leading up to the retirement of the Space Shuttle in 2010 by individuals from NASA JSC and the ARES Corporation. The report concluded that the current crewed Soyuz capsule has not been on enough flights to reliably measure the probability of a loss of mission, but that the overall history of the program shows that it performed roughly as reliably as other contemporary systems and that, while the number could be improved, significant improvement of reliability was not feasible with current technology.

Following a malfunction in the central thrust chamber of the launch escape system when it was routinely jettisoned during the 2009 Soyuz TMA-15 launch, concerns were raised by officials with NASA and Russian organizations (including the Machine Building Central Research Institute) about the quality control and reliability of Soyuz emergency systems.

== Soyuz abort history ==
Soyuz has experienced three launch aborts and one in-orbit abort. All crew members survived the aborts.

=== Launch aborts ===
Launch date	Mission	Cause of failure
5 April 1975	Soyuz 18a	Second stage separation failed prior to third stage ignition. The flight control computer detected a trajectory deviation and triggered an automated abort. Since the escape tower had already been jettisoned, the service module engines were used for the abort.
26 September 1983	Soyuz T-10-1	The rocket caught fire on the pad. The launch escape system was fired, pulling the spacecraft free two seconds before the rocket exploded. This is the only successful crewed pad abort.
11 October 2018	Soyuz MS-10	The Soyuz-FG rocket experienced an anomaly during staging, when one of the boosters hit the core stage and damaged the second stage. The launch escape system pulled the spacecraft free of the rocket.

=== In-orbit aborts ===
Launch date	Mission	Cause of failure
10 April 1979	Soyuz 33	The Soyuz 33 suffered a main engine failure. After consideration by ground crews, the mission was aborted by firing the back up engines and initiating a ballistic reentry.

== See also ==
- Apollo abort modes
- Space Shuttle abort modes
- Orion abort modes
