= Apollo abort modes =

Plans for mission abort during an Apollo spacecraft launch

Apollo abort modes were procedures by which the nominal launch of an Apollo spacecraft, either the Saturn IB or Saturn V rocket, could be terminated. The abort of the flight allowed for the rescue of the crew if the rocket failed catastrophically. Depending on how far the flight had progressed, different procedure or modes would be used. In the history of the Apollo Program, none of the abort modes were ever used on any of the fifteen crewed Apollo spacecraft flights.

Houston's announcements of the current abort mode and the spacecraft commander's acknowledgements were among the few things said on the radio link during the first minutes of flight.

If the rocket failed during the first phases of the flight, the Emergency Detection System (EDS) would automatically give the command to abort. The reason is that life-threatening situations can develop too fast for humans to discuss and react to. In the later, less violent phases of the ascent, the EDS was turned off and an abort would have to be initiated manually.

== Overview ==
Of the five abort modes, the modes up to three (III) are variations of jettisoning the entire rocket followed by an immediate landing in the sea (splashdown). Mode four (IV) and the Saturn V-specific modes are variations of jettisoning only the failing rocket stage, using the other stages to continue into Earth orbit. Once there, a backup Earth-orbit mission could be performed so that the flight was not entirely in vain. In all cases, the Command Module (CM) with the astronauts performs a splashdown by:

- Dumping the hypergolic fuel overboard since the toxic substance would be an unnecessary risk to recovery personnel.
- If high enough, deploying high-speed parachutes (drogue parachute).
- Jettisoning the drogues and deploying the main parachutes.
- Splashing down in the sea and waiting for recovery team to arrive

== Pad abort ==
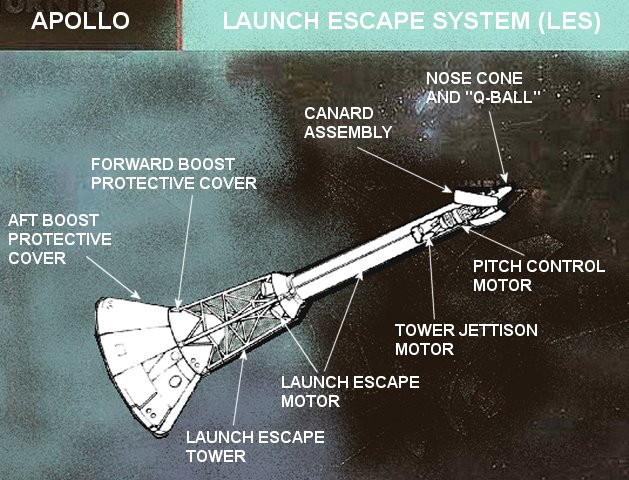
Apollo Launch Escape System diagram

If the rocket failed in the last five minutes before launch, the CM and the launch escape system (LES, see figure) would separate from the remainder of the rocket below with the LES propelling itself and the CM beneath it upward and eastward to the sea using a small solid-fueled motor (the launch escape motor) at the top of the tower on the launch escape system. The launch escape tower would then be jettisoned in anticipation of the parachute deployment and the CM would splash down. (Preparation for a pad abort is seen in Apollo video footage: five minutes before launch, the umbilical arm connecting to the CM retracts and swings clear of the rocket. It does so because the swing arm must be out of the way in case the EDS decides to abort.)

Two tests of the LES were conducted:

- Pad Abort Test-1: Launch Escape System (LES) abort test from launch pad with Apollo Boilerplate BP-6.
- Pad Abort Test-2: LES pad abort test of near Block-I CM with Apollo Boilerplate B-23A.

== Mode I ==
An abort using the LES, this abort mode could be conducted from launch until the LES was jettisoned 30 seconds after the ignition of the second stage.

=== Mode IA (one alpha) ===
During the first 42 seconds of flight for the Saturn V or 60 seconds of the flight for the Saturn IB, the rocket is still relatively upright and an abort is much like a pad abort, lasting up to 3,000 metres (9,800 ft). During the abort, the main pitch control motors move the CM out of the flight path of the possibly exploding rocket. At 14 seconds into the abort, the LES is jettisoned in the lead up to the splashdown.

=== Mode IB (one bravo) ===
From 3,000 metres (9,800 ft) to 30.5 km (100,000 ft), the rocket is tilted eastwards far enough that firing the pitch control motor is unnecessary. After the LES main motor moves the CM away from the rocket, the tower would deploy canards (small wings at the tip). They would force the CM-LES combination to pitch over with the CM bottom forward (blunt-end forward or BEF attitude.) This was necessary because the parachutes stowed at the CM top were only designed to be deployed in a downwind direction. (Note: As it turned out, however, the parachutes would still successfully deploy even with the CM traveling nose-forward; this was discovered during the A-003 abort test, when the canards deployed, but failed to flip the spacecraft blunt-end-forward due to an extremely high roll rate resulting from a booster malfunction.)

=== Mode IC (one charlie) ===
From 30.5 km (100,000 ft) until the LES is jettisoned, pitching the CM-LES combination over into the CM-forward position would still be necessary, but in the now thin air the canards are useless. Instead, the small engines of the CM's reaction control system (RCS) would do the job. During One-Charlie, the first staging occurs, that is the jettisoning of the spent first stage and ignition of the second stage. One-Charlie ceases about 30 seconds after the staging when the LES is jettisoned, at an altitude of about 90 km (295,000 ft or 55 miles).

== Mode II ==
With the LES jettisoned, the Command/Service Module (CSM) would separate as a whole from the rocket and use its large engine and RCS engines to move clear of the rocket and align itself. The CM would then separate from the Service Module (SM) and splash down.

== Mode III ==
A Mode III type abort would be used when a Mode II type would risk the spacecraft coming down over land, or landing in the cold water of the North Atlantic. The CSM would separate from the rocket in the same manner as a Mode II abort, but would additionally use the SPS engine to make either a posigrade burn (Mode IIIA) or retrograde burn (Mode IIIB) to land in a specific area on the eastern side of the Atlantic. Mode III was only available as a primary abort mode for 10–15 seconds during a Saturn IB launch and was only used as a backup abort mode for Saturn V launches, in case of an abort requiring the immediate landing of the spacecraft.

== Mode IV ==
Mode IV was an abort mode that occurred during the S-IVB burn. Should the S-IVB fail, the Service Module engine can place the CSM into Earth orbit to perform an Earth-orbit mission.

== Mode V ==
A Mode V abort was only planned for use during the Apollo-Soyuz Test Project launch. In the event of an early S-IVB shutdown, the CSM RCS thrusters would be used to insert the entire stack (including the docking adapter) into orbit. The time window for a Mode V abort was only 1.5 seconds before nominal S-IVB cutoff.

== Saturn V specific abort modes ==
During orbital abort phases (S-IVB to COI, S-IVB to orbit and Mode IV), modes II and III were available as backup modes in the event of further problems.

The EDS was enabled for the pad abort (beginning 5 minutes prior to launch) through abort mode IB phases. Beginning in mode IC, the EDS was switched off and aborts would have had to be commanded manually.

=== S-IVB to COI ===
("Saturn IV-B (NASA's designation for the Saturn V's third stage burn) To Contingency Orbit Insertion") In case of a failure of the S-II second stage, the stage would be jettisoned, and the rocket is high and fast enough that the S-IVB third stage, followed by the Service Module (SM) engine, has enough propellant to place the spacecraft in Earth orbit. There would not be enough propellant to perform trans-lunar injection, so only an Earth-orbit mission would be performed.

=== S-IVB to Orbit ===
The failing S-II would again be jettisoned, but Earth orbit insertion is now possible by the S-IVB alone. Other than not using the SM engine, this is identical to an S-IVB to COI abort.

== See also ==
- Apollo pre-launch abort modes
- Space Shuttle abort modes
- Orion abort modes
- Soyuz abort modes
