= List of fictional astronauts (exploration of inner Solar System) =

Lists of fictional astronauts
Early period	Project Mercury	Project Gemini
Project Apollo	1975–1989	1990–1999
2000–2009	2010–2029	Moon
Inner Solar System	Outer Solar System	Other
Far future

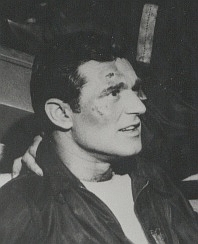
Actor Paul Comi as Warren Marcusson in "People Are Alike All Over" (1959 episode of The Twilight Zone)

The following is a list of fictional astronauts exploring the inner Solar System.

== Sun ==
Name(s)	Appeared in	Program / Mission / Spacecraft	Fictional date
Norman Paul "Dave" Davis, Maj. (Commander); Bernhard "Bud" Gierr, Capt. Orren "Doc" Lorimer, Dr. (Scientist)	Houston, Houston, Do You Read? (1976), novella	NASA; Sunbird One	Near Future (before 2000)
Norman Paul "Dave" Davis, Maj. (Commander); Bernhard "Bud" Gierr, Capt. Orren "Doc" Lorimer, Dr. (Scientist)	Crew of first circumsolar mission travels forward to time when male humans no longer exist.		
Euclid Station: Takumi; George; Lizzy (no last names given); Unnamed personnel Satellite tender: Max (Pilot) (no last name given); Travis "Trav" Hill, Ph.D. High-orbit shuttle: Six unnamed astronauts Robin Braide (CAPCOM) Starfire (test flight): Robin Braide (Commander); Leroy "Spin" Calder (Pilot); Melinda Wooster (Navigation and communication [NAVCOM]); James Giles, Lt. Col. (USAF) (Mission Specialist); Linwood "Doc" Deveraux, Dr. (Propulsion control [PROP]) Starfire (operational flight): Robin Braide (Commander); Spin Calder (Pilot); Melinda Wooster (NAVCOM); Travis Hill, Prof. (Ph.D.) (Mission Specialist); Linwood Deveraux, Dr. (PROP) Dick Crease (Alternate crew commander)	Starfire (1988), novel	NASA: Euclid Station (polar orbit space station); Satellite tender (call sign "Twinkletoes"); High-orbit shuttle Archimedes Station (equatorial orbit space station) Starfire (fusion-powered spacecraft)	c. 2015 (September) – August 2023
Fusion-powered spacecraft Starfire flies operational mission to Apollo asteroid 2021 XA (a.k.a. Everest), which is falling into the Sun. Wooster and Hill are first humans on an asteroid.
Skytown: "Skeet" Kelso, Adm. Avery; Unnamed personnel Helios: Steve Kelso, Capt. (Commander); Borg, Capt. (Executive Officer); Alex Noffe (UK) (Project Officer); Harvard Clark Gordon, Lt. McBride; Jensen Tracy "Bobby" Meeks, Lt. (Cryogenics and propulsion); Ken Minami, Dr. (Japan); Lamare; T.C. (France); Seven other astronauts	Solar Crisis (1990), film	United Command: Skytown (space station); U.S.S. Helios; Ra (probe); Chicago (cargo ship)	2050
Skytown: "Skeet" Kelso, Adm. Avery; Unnamed personnel Helios: Steve Kelso, Capt. (Commander); Borg, Capt. (Executive Officer); Alex Noffe (UK) (Project Officer); Harvard Clark Gordon, Lt. McBride; Jensen Tracy "Bobby" Meeks, Lt. (Cryogenics and propulsion); Ken Minami, Dr. (Japan); Lamare; T.C. (France); Seven other astronauts	Mission to deflect solar flare from destroying all life on Earth. Noffe is a "biogenetically enhanced human".		
Icarus I: Pinbacker (Captain); Fischer; Nakazawa; Lin; Esteves; Chow; Boes; White (no first names given) Icarus II: Kaneda (Captain); Harvey (Comms Officer/Second-in-command) "Cassie" Cassidy (Pilot); Mace (Engineer/Co-pilot); Trey (Navigator) "Cory" Corazon (Biologist/Life support); Robert Capa (Physicist); Searle, Dr. (Psych Officer)	Sunshine (2007), film	Icarus Project: Icarus I Icarus II	2050 2057
Icarus I: Pinbacker (Captain); Fischer; Nakazawa; Lin; Esteves; Chow; Boes; White (no first names given) Icarus II: Kaneda (Captain); Harvey (Comms Officer/Second-in-command) "Cassie" Cassidy (Pilot); Mace (Engineer/Co-pilot); Trey (Navigator) "Cory" Corazon (Biologist/Life support); Robert Capa (Physicist); Searle, Dr. (Psych Officer)	Icarus I vanishes on mission to reignite dying Sun with nuclear device; seven years later, Icarus II crew attempt same mission.		
Anton Harkov; Ivan Vanko; Unnamed cosmonauts/scientists	Iron Man: Armored Adventures "Iron Man vs. the Crimson Dynamo" (2009), TV	Project Pegasus: Prometheus One (space station); Escape shuttle	Contemporary
Anton Harkov; Ivan Vanko; Unnamed cosmonauts/scientists	Russian cosmonaut Vanko is caught in a solar flare while testing Crimson Dynamo armor on EVA from space station in solar orbit. Two years later, the Crimson Dynamo returns to Earth.		
Solar Explorer (NASA): Amy Michaels (NASA) Mission Commander/Surgeon; Callis John (NASA) Engineer; Heather Marshall (NASA)Astronomer/Physics; Alain Petit (France) Physics Solar Yacht (RB Group): Artem (Ukraine) (no last names given)	Silent Sun (2019), novel	Solar Explorer; Solar Yacht	2074
Solar Explorer (NASA): Amy Michaels (NASA) Mission Commander/Surgeon; Callis John (NASA) Engineer; Heather Marshall (NASA)Astronomer/Physics; Alain Petit (France) Physics Solar Yacht (RB Group): Artem (Ukraine) (no last names given)	A group of astronauts must investigate a strange extraterrestrial structure localized in solar orbit. Amy Michaels is a space veteran.		

== Mercury ==
Name(s)	Appeared in	Program / Mission / Spacecraft	Fictional date
First mission: Pavlik (no first name given) Second mission: Hugh Kellard; Binetti (Communications Officer) (no first name given); Morse (no first name given) Y-90: Shay (Navigator) (no first name given); Two unnamed crewmen John Halfrich; Hugh Kellard; Morgenson (Biophysicist) (no first name given)	"Sunfire!" (1962), short story	Survey: Y-90 (experimental cruiser)	Future (Autumn)
First mission: Pavlik (no first name given) Second mission: Hugh Kellard; Binetti (Communications Officer) (no first name given); Morse (no first name given) Y-90: Shay (Navigator) (no first name given); Two unnamed crewmen John Halfrich; Hugh Kellard; Morgenson (Biophysicist) (no first name given)	On second crewed mission to "Sunside" of Mercury, Kellard encounters intelligent photon-based lifeforms. Kellard was on the first mission to Ganymede.		
Willard "Will" Rowson (Captain); Camille Burkett, Ph.D. (Mineralogist); Eileen Harmon, Dr. (Stratigrapher); Joe Mardikian, Dr. (Geophysicist); Tom Marini, Dr. (Biologist); Milt Schlossberg, Dr. (Astronomer); Luigi Aiello; Babineau (Medic) (no first name given); Ren Hargedon; Mary Spurr (Spacesuit technician); Eric Trackman (Nuclear engineer); Arnie Zaino (Communications specialist)	"Hot Planet" (1963), short story	Albireo	Future
Willard "Will" Rowson (Captain); Camille Burkett, Ph.D. (Mineralogist); Eileen Harmon, Dr. (Stratigrapher); Joe Mardikian, Dr. (Geophysicist); Tom Marini, Dr. (Biologist); Milt Schlossberg, Dr. (Astronomer); Luigi Aiello; Babineau (Medic) (no first name given); Ren Hargedon; Mary Spurr (Spacesuit technician); Eric Trackman (Nuclear engineer); Arnie Zaino (Communications specialist)	Crew investigating Mercury's development of a temporary atmosphere.		
Clifford Greenberg, Col.	2061: Odyssey Three (1987), novel	Unknown	2030s
Clifford Greenberg, Col.	First man on Mercury, who landed at the south pole, joins the complement of the luxury spaceliner Universe thirty years later for the first landing on Halley's Comet.		
Marshall Donnington (Commander); Lee Tahori (Pilot); Victoria Preston	Collision Earth (2011), TV movie	Space Shuttle; USS Nautilus	Near Future (Autumn)
Marshall Donnington (Commander); Lee Tahori (Pilot); Victoria Preston	Astronauts preparing to orbit Mercury when solar event sets planet on collision course with Earth.		
John Russell, Capt.	Give Me Space (2016), short film	Unknown	Future
John Russell, Capt.	Astronaut stranded on inhabited Mercury by lack of fuel.		

== Venus ==
Name(s)	Appeared in	Program / Mission / Spacecraft	Fictional date
Harringway Hawling, Prof. (Commander/Physicist) (US); Raimund Brinkman/Robert Brinkman (Pilot) (Germany) (American in US version); Durand, Prof. (Chief Engineer) (USSR) (French in US version); Lao Tsu/Tchen Yu, Dr. (Linguist/Biologist) (China); Sumiko Omigura, M.D. (Physician) (Japan); Orloff, Prof. (Engineer/Nuclear Physicist) (Poland); Sikarna, Prof. (Mathematician) (India); Talua (Communications)	Der Schweigende Stern (a.k.a. First Spaceship on Venus, The Silent Star, The Astronauts, Planet of the Dead, Spaceship Venus Does Not Reply) (1960), film	World Federation for Space Research: Luna 3 (Moonbase); Kosmokrator I (Cosmostrator I in US version)	1970 (1985 in US version)
Harringway Hawling, Prof. (Commander/Physicist) (US); Raimund Brinkman/Robert Brinkman (Pilot) (Germany) (American in US version); Durand, Prof. (Chief Engineer) (USSR) (French in US version); Lao Tsu/Tchen Yu, Dr. (Linguist/Biologist) (China); Sumiko Omigura, M.D. (Physician) (Japan); Orloff, Prof. (Engineer/Nuclear Physicist) (Poland); Sikarna, Prof. (Mathematician) (India); Talua (Communications)	First mission to Venus discovers remnants of extinct civilization. Some names and nationalities different in original German version; in US version, Brinkman was first American on Moon.		
Jerry Garfield (Engineer-Navigator); Graham "Hutch" Hutchins, Dr (Biologist); George "Cole" Coleman (Scientist)	"Before Eden" (1961), short story	Morning Star	Future (before 2010)
Jerry Garfield (Engineer-Navigator); Graham "Hutch" Hutchins, Dr (Biologist); George "Cole" Coleman (Scientist)	Discoverers of life near the south pole of Venus.		
Barbara Clinton (Captain) (USCG Aux); Dana Perry (Navigator/Medical Technician); Joanna Sue Toliver (Engineer)	Sea Hunt; The Aquanettes (1961), TV	Operation Astronette	Contemporary
Barbara Clinton (Captain) (USCG Aux); Dana Perry (Navigator/Medical Technician); Joanna Sue Toliver (Engineer)	Female astronauts training for mission to Venus.		
Soviet Space Force: Sonya Mikhailovna, Maj. (Dr.) U.S. Space Force: Gordon Andrews, Capt. Three-person spacecraft: Unnamed pilot (UK); Unnamed obstetrician (USSR); Unnamed nurse (US)	"Boy Meets Dyevitza" (1962), short story	Soviet Space Force United States Space Force United Kingdom / Soviet Union / United States: Three-person spacecraft	c. 1960s/1970s
Soviet Space Force: Sonya Mikhailovna, Maj. (Dr.) U.S. Space Force: Gordon Andrews, Capt. Three-person spacecraft: Unnamed pilot (UK); Unnamed obstetrician (USSR); Unnamed nurse (US)	Experienced orbital pilot Andrews discovers that Mikhailovna has landed on Venus before him. Dymov, a Soviet cosmonaut, is mentioned as having been the first man on the Moon.		
Vega: Allan Kern/Alfred Kerns, Capt. Scherba/Allan Sherman/Howard Sherman; Masha/Marsha Evans (Note: Marsha is omitted in Voyage to the Planet of Prehistoric Women, in which "Marsha" is the code name of Earth control.) Sirius: Ilya Vasilyevich Vershinin/Brandon Lockhart/William Lockhart, Cmdr. Alyosha/André Ferneau; Roman Bobrov/Hans Walters	Planeta Bur (a.k.a. Planet of Storms, Storm Planet, Cosmonauts on Venus) (1962), film Voyage to the Prehistoric Planet (1965), film Voyage to the Planet of Prehistoric Women (aka The Gill Women of Venus) (1967), film	Soviet Union: Sirius; Vega; Capella (ships unnamed in Voyage to the Planet of Prehistoric Women) (Note: The ship corresponding to Sirius can be seen to be named Typhoon in one shot due to the use of stock footage from Nebo Zovyot (q.v.).) United States: Space Station Texas (Voyage to the Planet of Prehistoric Women only)	Near Future (Planeta Bur) 2020 (Voyage to the Prehistoric Planet) 1998–2000 (Voyage to the Planet of Prehistoric Women)
Vega: Allan Kern/Alfred Kerns, Capt. Scherba/Allan Sherman/Howard Sherman; Masha/Marsha Evans Sirius: Ilya Vasilyevich Vershinin/Brandon Lockhart/William Lockhart, Cmdr. Alyosha/André Ferneau; Roman Bobrov/Hans Walters	Three-spacecraft expedition to Venus loses spacecraft Capella to meteor; other two crews discover reptilian creatures and evidence of intelligent life. Film was twice re-edited for American release with character names changed.		
Jefferson "Jeff" Barton, Brig. Gen.	The Outer Limits; Cold Hands, Warm Heart (1964), TV	Project Vulcan	Near Future
Jefferson "Jeff" Barton, Brig. Gen.	Astronaut (played by William Shatner) afflicted by a mysterious disease after a mission to Venus.		
Howie "Shorty" (no last name given); Eric "Doc" Donovan (last name uncertain)	"Becalmed in Hell" (1965), short story	NASA: Venus ship	c. 1980s?
Howie "Shorty" (no last name given); Eric "Doc" Donovan (last name uncertain)	NASA astronauts in danger on mission to Venus. Eric, survivor of spacecraft crash on Moon, is an isolated central nervous system plugged into controls of Venus ship.		
Arcturus III: Two unnamed astronauts Arcturus IV: Unnamed astronaut	Voyage to the Bottom of the Sea; The Silent Saboteurs (1965), TV	United States: Arcturus III; Arcturus IV	1976
Arcturus III: Two unnamed astronauts Arcturus IV: Unnamed astronaut	When foreign power uses force field to destroy Arcturus III on re-entry, Seaview personnel must save Arcturus IV from same fate.		
Arthur "Artie"; Cory (last names not given)	"I Am the Doorway" (1971), short story	Project Zeus	Near Future (after 1979)
Arthur "Artie"; Cory (last names not given)	Presumed NASA crew on flight to Venus similar to cancelled Manned Venus Flyby. Arthur infected with alien organism, possibly during Cory's EVA; left paraplegic when parachutes malfunction. Cory dies in landing. Other astronauts mentioned: Markhan and Jacks made first Mars landing in 1979; Pedersen and Lederer lost in solar orbit on Apollo mission; John Davis killed by meteoroid strike on orbital observatory.		
Kennedy II: X Y Z (Commander) (names not given) Venus mission: Joseph Jackson/Jack Josephson, Capt. (Commander); Harry M. Evans, Col. (USAF) (Co-Pilot)	Beyond Apollo (1972), novel	Kennedy II (Mars spacecraft) Unknown (Venus spacecraft)	May 1976 1981
Kennedy II: X Y Z (Commander) (names not given) Venus mission: Joseph Jackson/Jack Josephson, Capt. (Commander); Harry M. Evans, Col. (USAF) (Co-Pilot)	After disastrous crewed Mars mission in 1976, two-man Venus mission ends in madness and death.		
Isvestia-2: Igor Nikanov United States: Williams, Maj. (Co-Pilot/Systems Engineer); Brown, Dr. (Flight Surgeon); Sharp, Lt. (Instrument Tech/Assistant Navigator) Project Astra: Don Price, Col. (Flight Commander); Georgianna "Georgie" Bronski, Maj. (Soviet Union) (Co-Pilot/Survival Specialist); Danny, Lt. (Communications); Kurt Mason, Capt. (Navigator); Christopher "Doc" Perry, Dr. Marion Turner, Dr. (Flight Surgeon/Microbiologist); Katie Carlson, Lt. (Computer Instrument Tech/Meteorologist)	Doomsday Machine (a.k.a. Escape from Planet Earth) (1972), film	Soviet Union: Isvestia-2 [sp.?] United States: Project Astra (Note: Spacecraft marked "JX-1" on hull.)	1975
Isvestia-2: Igor Nikanov United States: Williams, Maj. (Co-Pilot/Systems Engineer); Brown, Dr. (Flight Surgeon); Sharp, Lt. (Instrument Tech/Assistant Navigator) Project Astra: Don Price, Col. (Flight Commander); Georgianna "Georgie" Bronski, Maj. (Soviet Union) (Co-Pilot/Survival Specialist); Danny, Lt. (Communications); Kurt Mason, Capt. (Navigator); Christopher "Doc" Perry, Dr. Marion Turner, Dr. (Flight Surgeon/Microbiologist); Katie Carlson, Lt. (Computer Instrument Tech/Meteorologist)	Project Astra astronauts on two-year mission to Venus. Williams, Brown and Sharp are replaced on Astra crew at last minute. Bronski was the first woman on the Moon. Isvestia-2 strongly resembles an Apollo CSM.		
Cloudlab: Ed Townsend (Project Director); Deborah Townsend (Communications specialist); Chang Wu (Computer Center staff); Wagner, Mr. and Mrs. (Algae Ecology biologists) (no first names given) c. 50 unnamed personnel Hoverjet: David White (Pilot); Chris Wagner (Technician)	"Cloudlab" (1975), short story	Cloudlab (space station); Hoverjets	Future
Cloudlab: Ed Townsend (Project Director); Deborah Townsend (Communications specialist); Chang Wu (Computer Center staff); Wagner, Mr. and Mrs. (Algae Ecology biologists) (no first names given) c. 50 unnamed personnel Hoverjet: David White (Pilot); Chris Wagner (Technician)	While on algae-seeding mission from station in Venusian atmosphere, White and Wagner become first humans on Venus when they crash-land on Sagan Mountain.		
Goodie, Dr.	1st Issue Special #10 (January 1976), comic book	NASA: Alpha Zero	Contemporary
Goodie, Dr.	Surgeon injured on mission to Venus is turned into cyborg by aliens and becomes leader of a superhero group.		
USAS Outpost: Miles Davidow, Capt. Daniel Braithwaite, Maj. Hughes, Dr. (no first name given) Highlander: Harry (no last name given); Unnamed pilot Delta One: Kate Girard, Cmdr. Scott Perkins, Dr. (Physician); Unnamed engineer	The Outer Limits; The Joining (1998), TV	USAS; Aphrodite Project: USAS Outpost; Highlander (resupply ship); Delta One	November 2011 – June 2012
USAS Outpost: Miles Davidow, Capt. Daniel Braithwaite, Maj. Hughes, Dr. (no first name given) Highlander: Harry (no last name given); Unnamed pilot Delta One: Kate Girard, Cmdr. Scott Perkins, Dr. (Physician); Unnamed engineer	Davidow is sole survivor of disaster on Venus. USAS Outpost is located in Aphrodite Highlands.		
Antares: Ted Shaw (Mission Commander); Nadia Schilling (Germany) (Pilot/Second-in-command); Maddux Donner (Engineer/Venus lander pilot); Zoe Barnes (Geologist/Venus lander co-pilot); Jen Weston Crane (Canada) (Biologist); Evram "Ev" Mintz, Dr. (Israel) (Physician/Psychiatrist); Paula Morales (Payload Specialist); Steven "Wass" Wassenfelder (Physicist) Mike Goss, Dr. (Flight Director); Rollie Crane, Cmdr. (CAPCOM); Claire Dereux, Dr. (Canada) (Flight Surgeon); Ajay Sharma (India) (Engineer); Arnel Poe, Ph.D. (Engineer)	Defying Gravity (2009), TV	International Space Organization (ISO): Orion 2 Supply pod Antares; Crossbow (Venus lander); Talos (Mars lander)	2047 2052 (September – November)
In 2047, ASCANs train for potential assignment to Antares mission. Five years later, Antares departs Earth on grand tour of Solar System, starting with Venus. Mission commander Rollie Crane and engineer Sharma are replaced at last minute by backups Shaw and Donner due to mysterious buildups of cardiac plaque. Crew launches from Earth on Orion 2 on September 27, 2052.
E-B command ship: Ivar (Commander); Sandrine (no last names given) merleta: Bruno Almeida (Scientist); Vinicius Santos (Scientist) HighPoint space station: Tania Stern; Tom Weatherell; Mason Cline	"Windshear" (2015), short story	Euro-Brazilian (E-B) mission: Command ship merleta (lifting body/aerostat); Recovery dart HighPoint Industries: Space station Landis (aerostat)	Future
E-B command ship: Ivar (Commander); Sandrine (no last names given) merleta: Bruno Almeida (Scientist); Vinicius Santos (Scientist) HighPoint space station: Tania Stern; Tom Weatherell; Mason Cline	Brazilian astronaut Almeida is stranded aboard the damaged merleta after collision with a recovery dart.		
Unknown Russian spacecraft: Sergei (no last name given) NashaSlava1: Klara; Vasily; Yuraj (no last names given) JanHus1: Jakub Procházka	Spaceman of Bohemia (2017), novel Spaceman (2024), film	Russia: Unknown spacecraft NashaSlava1 (space shuttle) Space Program of the Czech Republic (SPCR): JanHus1 (space shuttle)	2018 (April – Winter)
Unknown Russian spacecraft: Sergei (no last name given) NashaSlava1: Klara; Vasily; Yuraj (no last names given) JanHus1: Jakub Procházka	Missions to investigate comet dust cloud between Earth and Venus; Russian missions are secret "phantom" missions. Klara's mother, Dasha Sergijovna, crewed a "phantom" suicide mission with another cosmonaut in 1962, trying to reach Mars. The 2024 film version moves the dust cloud to an orbit beyond Jupiter.		
Venera: Unnamed cosmonaut Aphrodite-1: McBride (Commander); Artanian (Command Remote Module Pilot [CRMP]) (no first names given)	"The Utmost Bound" (2018), short story	Soviet Union: Venera NASA: Aphrodite-1	Future
Venera: Unnamed cosmonaut Aphrodite-1: McBride (Commander); Artanian (Command Remote Module Pilot [CRMP]) (no first names given)	Aeneas rover, nicknamed Little Buddy and controlled from Venusian orbit by NASA astronauts, discovers a secret crewed Soviet lander from 20th century in Lakshmi Planum. McBride is on his fifth spaceflight.		

== "Counter-Earth" ==
Name(s)	Appeared in	Program / Mission / Spacecraft	Fictional date
EUROSEC: Borgener; Mitchell (no first names given) Phoenix: Glenn D. Ross, Col. (NASA); John Kane, Dr. (UK) (Astrophysicist)	Doppelgänger (aka Journey to the Far Side of the Sun) (1969), film	European Space Exploration Complex (EUROSEC) Operation Sun Probe: Phoenix; SSTO lifting body (lander) Dove (aka DOPPELGANGER) (SSTO lifting body)	2069
EUROSEC: Borgener; Mitchell (no first names given) Phoenix: Glenn D. Ross, Col. (NASA); John Kane, Dr. (UK) (Astrophysicist)	EUROSEC mission to a newly discovered unknown planet orbiting on exactly the opposite side of the Sun from Earth. Ross is a veteran of two Mars missions.		
Neil Stryker, Col.	The Stranger (aka Stranded in Space) (1973), TV movie	Pilgrim (3-man interplanetary craft)	Contemporary
Neil Stryker, Col.	NASA astronaut who crash-lands on a duplicate of Earth ruled by a totalitarian regime.		

== Mars ==
Name(s)	Appeared in	Program / Mission / Spacecraft	Fictional date
Warren "Marc" Marcusson; Samuel A. Conrad (Biologist)	"Brothers Beyond the Void" (1952), short story The Twilight Zone "People Are Alike All Over" (1960), TV	Unknown	Near Future
Warren "Marc" Marcusson; Samuel A. Conrad (Biologist)	Travellers to Mars; Marcusson dies after landing, Conrad is imprisoned by Martians. (In short story Marcusson travels to Mars alone, and his first name is Charles.)		
Mars 1: Edward McCauley, Col. (Commander); Jim Nichols, Capt. (Note: Appears in episode "Mission To Mars"; not the same character as Jim Nichols from "Christmas On the Moon".); Ralph Devers, Maj. Mars 2: Edward McCauley, Col. (Commander); Vic Devery, Maj. James Nichols, Capt. (Note: Appears in episode "Flight To the Red Planet"; not the same character as Nichols from "Christmas On the Moon" or "Mission To Mars".); Morrow, Dr. (Scientist) Russia: Tolchek, Col. (Commander); Gulyt, Maj.	Men into Space (a.k.a. Space Challenge); Mission To Mars, Flight To the Red Planet (1960), TV	United States Air Force: Mars 1 Mars 2 Russia: Unnamed spacecraft	c. 1970 – 1980
Mars 1: Edward McCauley, Col. (Commander); Jim Nichols, Capt. Ralph Devers, Maj. Mars 2: Edward McCauley, Col. (Commander); Vic Devery, Maj. James Nichols, Capt. Morrow, Dr. (Scientist) Russia: Tolchek, Col. (Commander); Gulyt, Maj.	Initial efforts to reach Mars. Mars 1 aborts flight to rescue Russian crew; Mars 2 lands on Phobos.		
Harold Barth, Lt Col. (Commander); Robert L. Greene, Maj. (Doctor); Saul Moulton, 1st Lt. Edward Krozney, Capt. James Wallach, Capt. Luthern J. White, Capt.	"Whatever Gods There Be" (1961), short story	Groundbreaker II	Future (Late 20th or early 21st century)
Harold Barth, Lt Col. (Commander); Robert L. Greene, Maj. (Doctor); Saul Moulton, 1st Lt. Edward Krozney, Capt. James Wallach, Capt. Luthern J. White, Capt.	Crew of an early Mars mission who find themselves faced with an agonizing choice after a landing accident forces them to dump weight or be unable to leave the planet.		
Lunar Seven: Dr. Farraday (head of Space Institute) (no first name given); Bradley (no first name given); Unnamed personnel Freight rockets: Unnamed personnel Oceano: Anders Brockman, Cmdr. (Captain); Tanya Krilova/Laura James (United States); Paul Grant Meteor: Tony Barrata (Pilot); Andrei Sayenko/Allan Brenner (Co-pilot)	Mechte Navstrechu (a.k.a. A Dream Come True, Encounter in Space, Toward Meeting a Dream) (1963), film Queen of Blood (a.k.a. Planet of Blood) (1966), film	International Institute of Space Technology (a.k.a. Space Institute): Moonbase (Lunar Seven); Freight rockets Command Ship Oceano Meteor; Rescue ship Oceano II	1990 (Queen of Blood)
Lunar Seven: Dr. Farraday (head of Space Institute) (no first name given); Bradley (no first name given); Unnamed personnel Freight rockets: Unnamed personnel Oceano: Anders Brockman, Cmdr. (Captain); Tanya Krilova/Laura James (United States); Paul Grant Meteor: Tony Barrata (Pilot); Andrei Sayenko/Allan Brenner (Co-pilot)	Soviet film reconfigured for American release with names changed, new cast and altered ending. Mars missions to rescue stranded aliens; Oceano lands on Mars, Meteor on Phobos. First successful Moon landing took place around 1970.		
George Lincoln; John F. Adams; Dwight D. Roosevelt; Thomas Alva Wright	"Harry Protagonist, Brain-Drainer" (1964), short short story	NASA: Project Long Leap	Near Future
George Lincoln; John F. Adams; Dwight D. Roosevelt; Thomas Alva Wright	Disaster ensues when the minds of millions of Americans are linked to those of the crew of the first Mars mission.		
M-1: Fred Thomas, Capt. (Commander); James Bowman, Lt. M-2: Charles "Lucky" (Note: Also known as "Chuck".) Merritt, Maj. (Commander); Jack Buckley, Capt. Paul Lazzari, Capt. Frank Johnson, Lt.	The Outer Limits; The Invisible Enemy (1964), TV	Interplanetary Vehicle M-1 (Colonization Probe) M-2	2021 May 8, 2024
M-1: Fred Thomas, Capt. (Commander); James Bowman, Lt. M-2: Charles "Lucky" Merritt, Maj. (Commander); Jack Buckley, Capt. Paul Lazzari, Capt. Frank Johnson, Lt.	Investigating the deaths of the two-man crew of the M-1 mission, the M-2 crew discovers carnivorous creatures living under the Martian sands.		
Dan "Mac" McReady, Col. (Commander); Christopher "Kit" Draper, Cmdr. (USN) (Co-Pilot)	Robinson Crusoe on Mars (1964), film	Mars Gravity Probe-1 (Elinor M)	Future
Dan "Mac" McReady, Col. (Commander); Christopher "Kit" Draper, Cmdr. (USN) (Co-Pilot)	NASA astronauts visiting Mars; one dies, the other is stranded.		
Second Martian Expedition: James Thornton Brown; Alec Dupres Fornier; Edwin E. Challenger (USAF); Unnamed crewmembers Jove 7: Sven Bjornsen; Sam "Ark" Arkwright "Chan" Chandra Mars-12-X: Harley Jacobs; Lewis Nostrand; Tatsu Nakomura, Dr. (passenger); Fabian Smith, Dr. (passenger)	Tin Lizzie (1964), novelette	Second Martian Expedition: Two Mark I space taxis (built by Ford Motor Company Aerospace Division) Jove 7 (tugship) American Museum of Natural History expedition: Mars-12-X	Future
Second Martian Expedition: James Thornton Brown; Alec Dupres Fornier; Edwin E. Challenger (USAF); Unnamed crewmembers Jove 7: Sven Bjornsen; Sam "Ark" Arkwright "Chan" Chandra Mars-12-X: Harley Jacobs; Lewis Nostrand; Tatsu Nakomura, Dr. (passenger); Fabian Smith, Dr. (passenger)	Second Martian Expedition abandoned space taxis on Phobos after they mysteriously began leaking. Approximately 80 years later, Challenger, now a retired brigadier general, advises Jove 7 crew as they use the space taxis to rescue the crew of Mars-12-X, which has also begun leaking after landing in the Xanthus Desert.		
Tigran Biryuzov; Five unnamed cosmonauts	The Wanderer (1964), novel	First Soviet People's Expedition (three ships)	Near Future
Tigran Biryuzov; Five unnamed cosmonauts	Cosmonauts orbiting Mars when artificial planet emerges from hyperspace into Earth orbit.		
Walt Dangerfield; Lydia Dangerfield	Dr. Bloodmoney, or How We Got Along After the Bomb (1965), novel	Dutchman IV	c. 1980s
Walt Dangerfield; Lydia Dangerfield	Mars-bound astronauts trapped in Earth orbit by the outbreak of World War III.		
Jack Westermark, Capt. Eight unnamed crewmembers	"Man In His Time" (1965), short story	Unknown (UK?)	Near Future (August)
Jack Westermark, Capt. Eight unnamed crewmembers	Westermark, sole survivor of first human Mars mission, finds himself living 3.3077 minutes ahead of Earth time.		
Alec Barham, Col.	The Outer Limits; The Brain of Colonel Barham (1965), TV	Unknown	Near Future
Alec Barham, Col.	Astronaut dying of leukemia volunteers for project to install his brain in Mars probe.		
Steve; Doc; Charlie; Dorothy	The Wizard of Mars (a.k.a. Horrors of the Red Planet) (1965), film	Mars Probe One	January 1, 1975
Steve; Doc; Charlie; Dorothy	Astronauts on Mars orbital mission who crash-land and discover Martian city at end of yellow road.		
Kane, Col. (Commander); Beard "Doc" Harlow, Maj. Nazarro (Radioman) (no first names given)	The Time Tunnel; One Way To The Moon (1966), TV	Mars Excursion Module (M.E.M.) 4	1978
Kane, Col. (Commander); Beard "Doc" Harlow, Maj. Nazarro (Radioman) (no first names given)	American astronauts on first human Mars flight make emergency landing on Moon in Mare Nectaris.		
American (unnamed); Russian (unnamed); Chinese (unnamed)	I tre cosmonauti (a.k.a. The Three Astronauts) (1966), picture book	Unknown	Future
American (unnamed); Russian (unnamed); Chinese (unnamed)	Three astronauts who land simultaneously on Mars.		
Swenson, Col. (Command Pilot); Witthoft; Reilly, Dr. (First names not given)	"Pioneer Trip" (1967), short story	Unknown	c. 1976
Swenson, Col. (Command Pilot); Witthoft; Reilly, Dr. (First names not given)	Crew of the first crewed US mission to Mars, faced with a critical medical emergency five weeks out from Earth.		
Friedman, Capt. Gulliver, Lt. Haertel (MS); Unnamed astronauts	Welcome to Mars (1967), novel	Project Ares: Von Braun; Two unnamed sister ships	c. 1980s
Friedman, Capt. Gulliver, Lt. Haertel (MS); Unnamed astronauts	After two teenagers get stranded on Mars testing a home made anti-gravity device, NASA is forced to mount a rescue mission using more conventional means.		
Shioda, Dr. Mars mission: Sano (Captain); Lisa (Biologist) (US); Miyamoto (Communications Officer); Stein, Dr. (Physician) Rescue rocket: Michiko Taki, Capt.	The X from Outer Space (1967), film	Japan: AAB Gamma; Lunar Base; Rescue rocket	Future
Shioda, Dr. Mars mission: Sano (Captain); Lisa (Biologist) (US); Miyamoto (Communications Officer); Stein, Dr. (Physician) Rescue rocket: Michiko Taki, Capt.	Seventh attempted Mars mission after previous missions disappeared. Shioda is replaced by Stein due to illness.		
Mike Blaiswick, Col. (Pilot); Duncan; Nick Grant (Geologist) Soviet Union: Three unnamed cosmonauts	Mission Mars (a.k.a. Murder in the Third Dimension) (1968), film	Unknown	Future
Mike Blaiswick, Col. (Pilot); Duncan; Nick Grant (Geologist) Soviet Union: Three unnamed cosmonauts	American astronauts encounter deadly sphere on Mars.		
Mars Probe 6: Carrington, Maj. Jim Daniels Mars Probe 7: Joe Lefee; Frank Michaels Recovery 7: Charles Van Lyden	Doctor Who; The Ambassadors of Death (1970), TV (1987 novel)	Mars Probe Project (UK): Mars Probe 6 Mars Probe 7 Recovery 7	Contemporary/Near Future
Mars Probe 6: Carrington, Maj. Jim Daniels Mars Probe 7: Joe Lefee; Frank Michaels Recovery 7: Charles Van Lyden	Daniels was killed on Mars by non-Martian aliens during Mars Probe 6 mission, driving Carrington insane. Van Lyden attempts recovery of Lefee and Michaels.		
Adrian Fairley (UK); Four unnamed astronauts Two unnamed astronauts (US)	Doctor Who "Soldiers from Zolta" (1970), short story	Two international spacecraft: Orbiter; Mars Bug	Contemporary/Near Future
Adrian Fairley (UK); Four unnamed astronauts Two unnamed astronauts (US)	Fairley, sole survivor of crash landing of Mars Bug, makes contact with aliens on Mars.		
George Cosby, Dr; Ralph Norton, Maj; William O'Brien; Mack Sheldon; Irwin Trott; Allan Watts, Dr; Briggs; Compton; Glennon; Gray; Jenkins; Lawrenson; McKinley; Morphy; Radcliffe; Thompson; Vaux; Wellgarth; Williams	The Earth is Near (1970 (German), 1973 (English)), novel	Project Alpha	Near Future
George Cosby, Dr; Ralph Norton, Maj; William O'Brien; Mack Sheldon; Irwin Trott; Allan Watts, Dr; Briggs; Compton; Glennon; Gray; Jenkins; Lawrenson; McKinley; Morphy; Radcliffe; Thompson; Vaux; Wellgarth; Williams	Crew of the first human expedition to Mars.		
NASA: Henry C. "Hank" Barstow, Col. (Chief of Astronaut Office); Bertrand L. "Bert" Richmond, Col. (Director of Flight Crew Operations); Tom Andretti; Bill Desey; Rick Johnson; Dave McWharter; Dick Ohlman; Allan Samson; Bill Wheatley Planetary Fleet One: Conrad H. (Note: The book is inconsistent about whether Trasker's middle initial is "H." or "C." Cf. pp. ix and 71.) "Connie" Trasker, Jr., Col. (USAF) (Mission Commander/MLV Commander); Alvin S. "Jazz" (Note: Also called "Jazzbo" by close friends.) Weickert III, Cmdr. (USN) (CSV Commander); J. V. "Jayvee" Halleck, Dr. (MSV Commander); Petros S. "Pete" Balkis, M.D. (MSV Co-Commander) Stuart Yule, Lt. Col. (CAPCOM); Roger Webb, Col. (USAF) (Backup CSV Commander) Planetary Fleet Two: Conrad H. Trasker, Jr. (Mission Commander/MLV Commander); Hugo S. "Gaudy" Gaudet, Cmdr. (USN) (CSV Commander); Emerson "Em" Wacker, Dr. (MSV Commander); Robert Curtis, Dr. (MSV Co-Commander) Soyuz 19: Two unnamed cosmonauts	The Throne of Saturn (1971), novel	NASA; Space Station Mayflower; Project Argosy: Planetary Fleet One ("Piffy One"): Mars Landing Vehicle (MLV) (Santa Maria); Command-Service Vehicle (CSV) (Nina [sic]); Medico-Scientific Vehicle (MSV) (Pinta); Mars Landing Module (MLM) (Adventurer) Planetary Fleet Two ("Piffy Two"): MLV (Santa Maria); CSV (Nina); MSV (Pinta II); MLM (Adventurer) Soviet Union: Space Station Stalin; Soyuz 19 ("Man in the Moon")	Late 1970s (April – January)
First planned Mars mission encounters Soviet interference during test phase at Tranquillity Base on Moon. Trasker is a Gemini and Apollo veteran; Weickert flew a Gemini mission with Trasker. MLV, CSV and MSV are modified Apollo CSMs with NERVA engines, launched by three Saturn Vs.
Olympus: Richmond (Commander); Nine unnamed astronauts Pegasus: Evans; Brennan; Sam (no last name given); Two unnamed astronauts	"Transit of Earth" (1971), short story	Space Administration (NASA?): Olympus, Pegasus	May 1984
Olympus: Richmond (Commander); Nine unnamed astronauts Pegasus: Evans; Brennan; Sam (no last name given); Two unnamed astronauts	Crew of lander Pegasus stranded on Mars prior to a transit of Earth across the Sun.		
John Phillips Mars mission: Brice Randolph, Col. Higgins	The Astronaut (1972), TV movie	Unknown	Near Future
John Phillips Mars mission: Brice Randolph, Col. Higgins	NASA delays disclosure of death of astronaut on a mission to Mars; another man is surgically altered to deceive the wife and the public.		
Walter "Bud" Richardson, Col. (Command Pilot); John Oxenshuer, Capt. Dave Vogel, Maj.	The Feast of St. Dionysus (1972), novella	NASA	c. 1990
Walter "Bud" Richardson, Col. (Command Pilot); John Oxenshuer, Capt. Dave Vogel, Maj.	After Richardson and Vogel die in sandstorm on first human Mars mission, Oxenshuer seeks spiritual enlightenment in California desert. Mars landing in Solis Lacus.		
Phoenix One: Tadell "Tad" Hansard (US) (Expedition Commander); Anoshi Wantanabe (Japan); Bapti Lal Bose (India) Phoenix Two: Feodore Aleksandrovitch Asturnov (Russia); Dirk Welles (UK); Bern Callieux (Pan-European Community of Nations) Space Shuttles: Unnamed US astronauts	The Far Call (1973), serial; (1978), novel	Phoenix Program: Phoenix One; Phoenix Two	1983
Phoenix One: Tadell "Tad" Hansard (US) (Expedition Commander); Anoshi Wantanabe (Japan); Bapti Lal Bose (India) Phoenix Two: Feodore Aleksandrovitch Asturnov (Russia); Dirk Welles (UK); Bern Callieux (Pan-European Community of Nations) Space Shuttles: Unnamed US astronauts	International crew of the first human mission to Mars.		
Unnamed astronaut Ben Johnson	"The Mars Stone" (1973), short short story	Zeus 7: MEM	Near Future
Unnamed astronaut Ben Johnson	First astronauts on Mars make astonishing discovery.		
Jules Fishman, Capt. Unnamed woman	"Ups and Downs" (1973), short story	United States: Mars Project	1993
Jules Fishman, Capt. Unnamed woman	Astronaut on first Mars mission finds mysterious woman in his spacecraft.		
Albert Michaelson Thorsen, Prof.	Marsman meets the Almighty (1975), novelette	Unknown; Ares	Near Future (Viking landings are referred to in the past tense.)
Albert Michaelson Thorsen, Prof.	NASA Exobiologist selected as crew for the first American human mission to Mars after a remarkable discovery by the first Mars rover in Solis Lacus.		
Two unnamed astronauts	Battle of the Planets; Rescue of the Astronauts (1978), TV	Unknown (Apollo-like)	Future
Two unnamed astronauts	Astronauts who conducted electronic survey of Mars are captured after splashdown by agents of Zoltar. (Note: It is not specified whether the astronauts traveled to Mars or conducted survey from Earth orbit.)		
Charles Brubaker, Col. (Command Pilot); Peter Willis, Lt. Cmdr. John Walker, Cmdr.	Capricorn One (1978), film/novel	Capricorn One (Apollo-like)	Contemporary/Near Future (January 4 – September)
Charles Brubaker, Col. (Command Pilot); Peter Willis, Lt. Cmdr. John Walker, Cmdr.	Astronauts secretly removed from a NASA mission to Mars – aboard a faulty ship – that goes terribly wrong.		
Prometheus One: Steve West; Mike (Last name not given); McManus (First name not given) Prometheus Two: Three unnamed astronauts	The Incredible Melting Man (1978), novelization	Prometheus Program: Prometheus One; Prometheus Two	Near Future
Prometheus One: Steve West; Mike (Last name not given); McManus (First name not given) Prometheus Two: Three unnamed astronauts	Crews of the first American human missions to Mars, attacked by an unknown force once they land. (Note: The plotline is very heavily influenced by The Quatermass Experiment and Who Goes There?)		
Galactic II: Randolph Stuart, Capt. Rigby Deems, Lt. Frank Perlman, Lt. Phoebe Swedlow, Cmdr. (Note: Referred to in the novel as an Astronette, the author's term for a female astronaut.)	Sunstrike (1978), novel	Operation Mars: Galactic I Galactic II	1988
Galactic II: Randolph Stuart, Capt. Rigby Deems, Lt. Frank Perlman, Lt. Phoebe Swedlow, Cmdr.	Flight crew of the first crewed US mission to Mars, assigned to a desperate mission to prevent a madman from destroying humanity.		
Tom Easton (Commander); Bill Frager; Michael McKendrick	Meteor (1979), film/novel	Challenger-2	Near Future
Tom Easton (Commander); Bill Frager; Michael McKendrick	Astronauts on a spacecraft traveling to Mars that happens to look exactly like Skylab.		
Hubbard, Cmdr. (UK); Hamilton (US) (no first names given)	Contamination (aka Alien Contamination) (1980), film	Unknown	Near Future
Hubbard, Cmdr. (UK); Hamilton (US) (no first names given)	Crew of international Mars mission lands at polar ice cap and discovers eggs in cave.		
Shiraz Mitradati; Petra Greenfield; Elke; Sergi; Shai-Lung; Taro; Leidu, Dr.	"Voices From The Dust" (1980), short story	Unknown	2001
Shiraz Mitradati; Petra Greenfield; Elke; Sergi; Shai-Lung; Taro; Leidu, Dr.	Astronauts exploring the Valles Marineris who discover something remarkable.		
NASA: Ed Christophers; Rokby; Sylvester; Patterson; Dwyer (First names not given for the last four US crew) FKA: Mikhail Aleksander; Vassili Karklin; Anatole Kuznetzov; Tchigorin; Ilyashenko (First names not given for the last two Russian crew) ESA: Thomas Cavendish; Cesare Montuori; Kristian Niskanen; Axel Lorenz	The Olympus Gambit (1983), novel	Eris (renamed Pallas Athene)	Near Future
NASA: Ed Christophers; Rokby; Sylvester; Patterson; Dwyer (First names not given for the last four US crew) FKA: Mikhail Aleksander; Vassili Karklin; Anatole Kuznetzov; Tchigorin; Ilyashenko (First names not given for the last two Russian crew) ESA: Thomas Cavendish; Cesare Montuori; Kristian Niskanen; Axel Lorenz	International crew of the first human mission to Mars.		
Neal Braddock, Capt. (US); David Tremayne (US); Alexander Kalsinov, Col. (USSR); Olga Denarenko (USSR); Kurt Steiner, Maj. (GER); Phillipe Berdoux, Dr. (FRA); Dominica Mastrelli (ITA); Guy Sterling (Canada); Pamela Cooper (UK)	Murder in Space (aka Whodunit? Murder in Space) (1985), TV movie/novel	International Space Exploration Administration (ISEA): Conestoga Space Shuttle; Delta 216	Near Future
Neal Braddock, Capt. (US); David Tremayne (US); Alexander Kalsinov, Col. (USSR); Olga Denarenko (USSR); Kurt Steiner, Maj. (GER); Phillipe Berdoux, Dr. (FRA); Dominica Mastrelli (ITA); Guy Sterling (Canada); Pamela Cooper (UK)	Astronauts and cosmonauts returning from Mars aboard a 'space lab' whose successful mission is suddenly rocked by a series of murders. (Note: F.X. Woolf is a pseudonym for authors Howard Engels & Janet Hamilton.)		
Redenbaugh (Commander); Thomas (Landing party commander); Johnboy; Woody	"The Gods of Mars" (1986), short story	Plowshare; Lander	Future
Redenbaugh (Commander); Thomas (Landing party commander); Johnboy; Woody	NASA astronauts on first human Mars mission encounter strange alteration of reality. Landing in Chryse Basin.		
Shuttlecraft SC37 (NASA Mars mission): Porter, Maj. (Captain) "Doc" (Scientist); Unnamed personnel Shuttlecraft SC37 (L-5 evacuation): Roger Campbell (Computer expert/Acting captain); Adrian Kimberly, Dr. (Science officer); Cal (no last name given) (Security); Billy Lynn, Lt. (Chief Engineer); Sherrie Stevens (Nutritionist) Shuttlecraft SC45: Unnamed personnel L-5: William Hamilton, Col. Mitchell, Lt. Unnamed personnel	Star Crystal (1986), film	Shuttlecraft SC37; Shuttlecraft SC45; L-5 space station	2032
Shuttlecraft SC37 (NASA Mars mission): Porter, Maj. (Captain) "Doc" (Scientist); Unnamed personnel Shuttlecraft SC37 (L-5 evacuation): Roger Campbell (Computer expert/Acting captain); Adrian Kimberly, Dr. (Science officer); Cal (no last name given) (Security); Billy Lynn, Lt. (Chief Engineer); Sherrie Stevens (Nutritionist) Shuttlecraft SC45: Unnamed personnel L-5: William Hamilton, Col. Mitchell, Lt. Unnamed personnel	Rock discovered near crater of Olympus Mons contains crystal computer and alien creature. Five L-5 crewmembers escape station's destruction aboard shuttlecraft.		
First International Mars Expedition: Leon Odinga (Note: Last name not confirmed; "Odinga" is wife's surname.) (Nova Africa) (Chief Engineer); Unnamed cosmonauts Second International Mars Expedition: Unnamed cosmonauts	Fire on the Mountain (1988), novel	Pan African Space Administration (P.A.S.A.): First International Mars Expedition Second International Mars Expedition: Lion	1954 (Alternate History) October 1959 (Alternate History)
First International Mars Expedition: Leon Odinga (Nova Africa) (Chief Engineer); Unnamed cosmonauts Second International Mars Expedition: Unnamed cosmonauts	In alternate history in which John Brown's raid on Harpers Ferry in 1859 was successful, cosmonaut Leon is killed in EVA accident on Mars flyby mission. Five years later, Lion makes first human Mars landing.		
Nixon Orbital Park: Leroy Johnson (National Park Service) (Station Chief) Mary Poppins: Natasha Alyosha Katerina Ivanovna Kirov (Captain); Bass (no first name given) (Second Officer); Sundiata Cinque Jeffries, M.D. (Third Officer/Chief Medical Officer); Louis Glamour, ASC (Cinematographer); Cary "FF" Fonda-Fox IV (Movie Star); Beverly "BG" Glenn (Movie Star); Greetings Brother Buffalo Gentry (Stowaway)	Voyage to the Red Planet (1990), novel	Old Moulmein Pagoda (Columbia-class space shuttle) National Park Service (owned by Disney-Gerber): Nixon Orbital Park Voyager Pictures: Mary Poppins; Konstantin Tsiolkovsky (lander)	c. 2020
Nixon Orbital Park: Leroy Johnson (National Park Service) (Station Chief) Mary Poppins: Natasha Alyosha Katerina Ivanovna Kirov (Captain); Bass (no first name given) (Second Officer); Sundiata Cinque Jeffries, M.D. (Third Officer/Chief Medical Officer); Louis Glamour, ASC (Cinematographer); Cary "FF" Fonda-Fox IV (Movie Star); Beverly "BG" Glenn (Movie Star); Greetings Brother Buffalo Gentry (Stowaway)	First human Mars mission films motion picture. Landing near Candor Chasm in Valles Marineris canyon system. Bass and Johnson are former NASA astronauts.		
Martin Gold, Dr. (Geologist); Mary Elizabeth Allen, Dr. (Physician); Lawrence Thompson, Dr. (Physicist) Young Astronauts: Genshiro "Gen" Akamasu (Japan); Sergei Mikhailovich Chuvakin (Russia); Nathan Long (USA); Karl Muller (Germany); Lanie Rizzo (real name Lanie Johnson) (USA); Noemi Tejas y Velasquez (Venezuela); Alice Frances Thorne (New Zealand); Oh Suk "Suki" Long (Japan); Vikram Singh; Kovi Oldjai; Dale; David; Leon	The Young Astronauts (1990), novel	Space Shuttle United Nations To Mars Together program: Nina; Pinta; Santa Maria	Future
Martin Gold, Dr. (Geologist); Mary Elizabeth Allen, Dr. (Physician); Lawrence Thompson, Dr. (Physicist) Young Astronauts: Genshiro "Gen" Akamasu (Japan); Sergei Mikhailovich Chuvakin (Russia); Nathan Long (USA); Karl Muller (Germany); Lanie Rizzo (real name Lanie Johnson) (USA); Noemi Tejas y Velasquez (Venezuela); Alice Frances Thorne (New Zealand); Oh Suk "Suki" Long (Japan); Vikram Singh; Kovi Oldjai; Dale; David; Leon	Teenagers compete for opportunity to help colonize Mars.		
Viktor Shevchenko (Soviet Union); Gregory Nunn (NASA)	Angel Eyes (1991), novel	Odin-Galaktika II	Contemporary/Near Future
Viktor Shevchenko (Soviet Union); Gregory Nunn (NASA)	Aborted first human flight to Mars. Odin-Galaktika II is launched by SL-17 Energiya with six strap-on boosters.		
Dean Irwin, Col. (USAF) (Commander); Clifford Horner, Capt. (US Army); John Merritt, Cmdr. (USN); Valentina Tsarev, Col. (Russia) (Doctor); Hiroshi Kawahito (Japan) (Computer specialist)	"The Message from Mars" (1992), short story	Zeus IV	November 2007 – April 29, 2008
Dean Irwin, Col. (USAF) (Commander); Clifford Horner, Capt. (US Army); John Merritt, Cmdr. (USN); Valentina Tsarev, Col. (Russia) (Doctor); Hiroshi Kawahito (Japan) (Computer specialist)	The crew of the first human Mars mission mysteriously fail to leave their spacecraft after returning to Earth.		
Sismondi Napoleon, Cmdr; 23 unnamed astronauts	Nomad 4: Desert Fire (1993), novel	Unknown	Early 21st Century (Note: Most of the novel is set in 2035, the failed Mars mission happened some years prior to this.)
Sismondi Napoleon, Cmdr; 23 unnamed astronauts	Crew of the first human Mars mission, killed by oxygen starvation when substandard components in their spacecraft fail.		
Scott Keller (USA) (Commander); Sakata (Japan); Petrovich; Unnamed astronaut	seaQuest DSV; Better Than Martians (1994), TV	Space Command: Wayfarer	2018
Scott Keller (USA) (Commander); Sakata (Japan); Petrovich; Unnamed astronaut	When the Wayfarer sinks upon splashdown, seaQuest mounts a rescue mission. Keller was first human on Mars. Astronauts took Martian core samples from Tharsis Bulge/Olympus Mons.		
James (Commander); Henry; Pierre; Don; Geoff (no last names given); Unnamed astronaut	"Homecoming" (1995), short story	NASA: Mars 1	Near Future
James (Commander); Henry; Pierre; Don; Geoff (no last names given); Unnamed astronaut	When nuclear engine fails on approach to Mars, unnamed astronaut kills his crewmates in order to stay alive.		
Al Wells (Commander); Ed Barkley; Pete Claridge, Dr.	The Outer Limits; The Voyage Home (1995), TV	American Space Agency (ASA): Mars III	Contemporary/Near Future (Note: The mission is discussed as a recent event in the clip show The Voice of Reason, which has a contemporary setting.)
Al Wells (Commander); Ed Barkley; Pete Claridge, Dr.	First human Mars mission is infiltrated by ancient alien species. Barkley was first man on Mars.		
First Aerospace Squadron (NASA): Bill Amundsen (Squadron commander) Phobos One: Walter Gander (USA) (Commander); Dmitri Tomasovich (Russia) (No surname given); Three unnamed astronauts (ESA, Japan, China) Mars Five: Walter Gander, Capt. (USA) (Commander); Olga Trigorin (Russia) (Engineer/First Officer); Jason Terence (USA) (Pilot/Second Officer); Narihara "Nari" Nigawa, Ph.D. (Japan) (Mission Specialist); Ilsa Bierlein (ESA) (Mission Specialist); Vassily Chebutykin, Ph.D. (Russia) (Mission Specialist); Dong Te-Hua (China) (Mission Specialist); Paul Fleurant (France) (Mission Specialist); Kireiko Masachi (Japan) (Mission Specialist); Tsen Chou-zung, Dr. (China) (Mission Specialist); Mark Bene (Yankee Clipper return pilot) Dean (No surname given), CAPCOM Mars Five Alpha: Scotty Johnston (USA) (Pilot); Robert Prang (USA) (Sedimentologist); Eight unnamed astronauts (USA, Russia) Korolev Base: Yvana Borges (Base manager); Das "Doc C." Chalashajerian, Dr. Pete Johnson (USA) (Biophysicist); Akira Yamada (Japan) (Meteorologist); Jim Flynn (USA)	Encounter with Tiber (1996), novel	Phobos One: Mars-Earth Return Cycler (MERC) Aldrin; Lander (modified Apollo II) Mars Five: Yankee Clipper (SSTO); MarsHab Mars Five Alpha: MERC Aldrin Korolev Base	2018 2033
On Phobos One mission, Gander and Dmitri make first human landing on Phobos on December 25, 2018. In 2033, Mars Five and Mars Five Alpha travel to Mars to help excavate alien artifacts near established base in Crater Korolev.
D-prime mission: Adam Bleeker (CDR); Ralph Gershon (Mars Excursion Module Pilot [MMP]) Ares: Philip Stone (CDR); Natalie B. York, Ph.D. (Mission Specialist [MSP]); Ralph Gershon (MMP)	Voyage (1996), novel	NASA: D-prime mission: Apollo CSM (New Jersey); Mars Excursion Module (MEM) 009 (Iowa) Ares: Apollo CSM (Discovery); Mission Module (Endeavor [sic]); MEM (Challenger)	August 1984 (Alternate History) March 21, 1985 – November 6, 1986 (Alternate History)
D-prime mission: Adam Bleeker (CDR); Ralph Gershon (Mars Excursion Module Pilot [MMP]) Ares: Philip Stone (CDR); Natalie B. York, Ph.D. (Mission Specialist [MSP]); Ralph Gershon (MMP)	In alternate history, D-prime mission is test flight of Mars lander (MEM) in Earth orbit. Ares flies first human Mars mission (with Venus flyby for gravity assist); landing at Mangala Vallis in March 1986.		
Mars Probe: Grosvenor; Guest (no first names given) Mars Probe 13: Alexander "Lex" Christian (Space Defence Division) (Commander); Albert Fitzwilliam; Madeline Goodfellow Mars 97: Richard Michaels, Capt. (Commander); Andi McCray; Bob Haigh; Claudia (no last name given); Campbell; Singh; McGowan; Lewis (no first names given for last four)	Doctor Who; The Dying Days (1997), novel	Mars Probe Project (UK) Mars 97 (Mars Orbiter/Mars Lander) (UK)	1970s/1980s May 1997
Mars Probe: Grosvenor; Guest (no first names given) Mars Probe 13: Alexander "Lex" Christian (Space Defence Division) (Commander); Albert Fitzwilliam; Madeline Goodfellow Mars 97: Richard Michaels, Capt. (Commander); Andi McCray; Bob Haigh; Claudia (no last name given); Campbell; Singh; McGowan; Lewis (no first names given for last four)	Christian, accused of murdering Fitzwilliam and Goodfellow after Mars Probe 13's departure from Mars, escapes in May 1997 after 20 years' imprisonment. At the same time, Mars 97 mission to Mare Sirenum runs into trouble. Grosvenor and Guest made first human Mars landing at bottom of Olympus Mons during earlier Mars Probe Project.		
Mars Voyager: Boris Brodsky (Russia) (Commander); Martin A. Chadwick (USA) (Geologist); Chou Lin (China) (Physicist); Georgi Maladev (Russia) (Pilot/Navigator); Adam J. Thompson (USA); Jeffery Walker, Dr. (Great Britain) (Microbiologist/Physician); Kishi Yamoto (Japan) (Electronics specialist) Celeste: Adam Thompson (USA) (Commander); Louis Alvarez (Spain) (Pilot); Matthew C. Duncan, Prof. (Canada) (Linguist); Erica Williams Duncan (USA) (Registered Nurse); Brian T. Hawkins (Great Britain) (Physicist); Sanjay Kanti (India) (Electrical engineer); Valeri Karamov (Russia) (Pilot); Frank Manzoni (Italy) (Physicist); Carlos Niemeyer (Brazil) (Communications/computer specialist); Marina Selveg (Russia)(Microbiologist/Physician); Henri Talon (France) (Computer specialist); Sato Tanaka (USA) (Communications) Copernicus: Frank Morgan (Pilot); Samantha Jackson (Copilot) Lunar Colony: Donald T. Hartman (Director); Irene Hartman; 26 unnamed personnel	The Face on Mars (1997), novel	Space Station Prometheus; Mars Voyager; Explorer (lander) Celeste (refitted Mars Voyager); Questor (lander); Lunar shuttle Copernicus; Lunar Colony	2040 2044
The first two crewed missions to Mars investigate the mysterious "Cydonia Face", but the second expedition must combat violence from within. First landing near southeast corner of Acidalia Planitia; second landing closer to Face.
Andrew Poe (Biochemist); Carl; Dee; Scott (no last names given for last three)	Ghost Stories; Cold Dark Space (1997), TV	Mars Mission Venture (MV 1)	Future
Andrew Poe (Biochemist); Carl; Dee; Scott (no last names given for last three)	Crew of spacecraft struck by meteoroid while returning from Mars.		
Gary Hackman (Computer specialist); Gordon A. Peacock (Computer specialist) Aries: William "Wild Bill" Overbeck (Commander); Julie Ford (Mission Specialist/Geologist); Fred Z. Randall (Computer specialist)	RocketMan (1997), film	NASA: MTS-1 Aries; Pilgrim One (lander)	Contemporary/Near Future
Gary Hackman (Computer specialist); Gordon A. Peacock (Computer specialist) Aries: William "Wild Bill" Overbeck (Commander); Julie Ford (Mission Specialist/Geologist); Fred Z. Randall (Computer specialist)	Geeky computer genius Randall is last-minute replacement for Hackman on first human Mars mission; Peacock is potential alternate replacement. Landing at Planitia Base near Valles Marineris.		
Hannon, Maj. (no first name given) (Note: Not explicitly stated to be an astronaut.) Geophysical Station 2375BN: Minsky, Dr. (no first name given) Antares 9G: Elaine Botkins, Capt. (Mission Commander); Bryan Minsky, Spec. (Engineer)	Winged (1997), short film	ENSA: Geophysical Station 2375BN; Antares 9G (shuttle)	2049 (March – May 20)
Hannon, Maj. (no first name given) Geophysical Station 2375BN: Minsky, Dr. (no first name given) Antares 9G: Elaine Botkins, Capt. (Mission Commander); Bryan Minsky, Spec. (Engineer)	Dr. Minsky refuses to accompany his crew when they leave space station in Martian orbit; Capt. Botkins and Minsky's son Bryan are sent to convince him to leave. Antares 9G arrives at station on May 20, 2049.		
Schiaparelli: Zoe Nash (Expedition Leader/Chief Pilot/Backup Communications); Reza Armani (Chief Geologist/Areologist/Backup Pilot); Ludwig Holter (Germany) (Communications/Backup Computer Specialist); Jenny Kopal (Hungary) (Computer Specialist/Backup Head of Instrumentation); Alta McIntosh-Mohammad (Great Britain/Federation of Indian States) (Chief Engineer); Wilmer Oldfield (Australia) (Astronomer); Celine Tanaka (Head of Instrumentation/Physician) ISS-2: Ursula Klein; Lawrence Morphy; Two unnamed astronauts	Aftermath (1998), novel	Schiaparelli ISS-1; ISS-2	2026 (from February 9)
Crew of first Mars expedition tries to return home after Earth's technology is devastated by electromagnetic pulse caused by gamma ray burst from Alpha Centauri supernova.
Patrick Ross, Cmdr. (Captain); Dennis Gamble; Anne Sampas	Species II (1998), film	National Space Exploration [?] (N.S.E.G.): Excursion (incorporates space shuttle); Lander (Eagle?)	Near Future
Patrick Ross, Cmdr. (Captain); Dennis Gamble; Anne Sampas	Ross, the first man on Mars, and Sampas are infected by alien DNA from Martian soil sample.		
Lia Poirier (Sagan Commander [Mars]); John Rank (Sagan Commander [Flight]); Andrea Singer (Mission Chemist); Bill Malone (Mission Architect); Sergei Andropov (Mission Biogeochemist)	Escape from Mars (1999), TV movie	International Mars Venture (IMV): Sagan	2015
Lia Poirier (Sagan Commander [Mars]); John Rank (Sagan Commander [Flight]); Andrea Singer (Mission Chemist); Bill Malone (Mission Architect); Sergei Andropov (Mission Biogeochemist)	Two-and-a-half year mission funded by private consortium.		
NASA: Robbie "Robbs" Barth Mars Consortium: Katherine Molina (Pilot); Venture: Viktor Nelyubov (Commander); Marc Bryant (Pilot/Geologist); Julia "Jules" Barth (Biologist/Medical Officer); Raoul Molina (Mechanic) Valkyrie: Claudine Jesum (France) (Commander/Medic); Gerda Braun (Germany) (Engineer); Lee Chen, Dr. (Exobiologist)	The Martian Race (1999), novel	Mars Consortium: Venture (Mars Landing-Habitat Module [Hab]) Airbus Group: Valkyrie NASA: Earth Return Vehicle (ERV)	February 20, 2016 – March 14, 2018
NASA: Robbie "Robbs" Barth Mars Consortium: Katherine Molina (Pilot); Venture: Viktor Nelyubov (Commander); Marc Bryant (Pilot/Geologist); Julia "Jules" Barth (Biologist/Medical Officer); Raoul Molina (Mechanic) Valkyrie: Claudine Jesum (France) (Commander/Medic); Gerda Braun (Germany) (Engineer); Lee Chen, Dr. (Exobiologist)	NASA and ESA astronauts transfer to private companies competing for $30 billion Mars Prize. Consortium crew makes first human landing on August 9, 2016, in Gusev Crater.		
John Mark Kelly, Lt. Rose Kumagawa; Andrei Novakovich	Star Trek: Voyager; One Small Step (1999), TV	Ares IV	2032
John Mark Kelly, Lt. Rose Kumagawa; Andrei Novakovich	NASA astronauts on an early mission to Mars.		
Lee Forbes, Cmdr. Susan Roberts; Tanya Webster; Paul Webster	Doctor Who; Red Dawn (2000), audio play	Ares One	2000s
Lee Forbes, Cmdr. Susan Roberts; Tanya Webster; Paul Webster	Crew of privately funded NASA mission. Tanya turns out to be part-Martian.		
Jesus do Sul: João Fernando Conselheiro, Ph.D. (Commander); Unnamed Brazilian astronaut Agamemnon/Ulysses: Seven unnamed astronauts Don Quijote: John Radkowski (USAF) (Commander); Tanisha Yvonne "Tana" Jackson, M.D./Ph.D. (Medical officer/biologist); Ryan Martin (Canada) (Systems engineer); Chamlong "Cham" Limpigomolchai, Ph.D. (Thailand) (Geologist); Estrela Carolina Conselheiro (Brazil) (Geologist); Brandon Weber (impersonating Trevor Whitman) (Passenger)	Mars Crossing (2000), novel	Brazil: Jesus do Sul NASA: Agamemnon; Ulysses (Mars Return Launch Module); Butterfly (Mars airplane) Don Quijote; Dulcinea (Mars Return Launch Module)	2020 2022 2028
Jesus do Sul: João Fernando Conselheiro, Ph.D. (Commander); Unnamed Brazilian astronaut Agamemnon/Ulysses: Seven unnamed astronauts Don Quijote: John Radkowski (USAF) (Commander); Tanisha Yvonne "Tana" Jackson, M.D./Ph.D. (Medical officer/biologist); Ryan Martin (Canada) (Systems engineer); Chamlong "Cham" Limpigomolchai, Ph.D. (Thailand) (Geologist); Estrela Carolina Conselheiro (Brazil) (Geologist); Brandon Weber (impersonating Trevor Whitman) (Passenger)	First three expeditions to Mars, the first two of which result in loss of all crew. Jesus do Sul lands at Martian north pole; Agamemnon lands on eastern rim of Acidalia Planitia; Don Quijote lands on edge of Felis Dorsa. Whitman wins contest for slot on third expedition.		
Maggie McConnell (USAF); Bjornstrom (Geologist) Mars 1: Luke Graham, Ph.D. (Commander); Sergei Kirov; Nicholas Willis; Reneé Coté Mars Recovery Mission: Woodrow "Woody" Blake (Commander); Jim McConnell (Copilot) (USAF); Terri Fisher; Phil Ohlmyer WSS: Ray Beck (NASA) (Mars Mission Control Room MMCR); Unnamed personnel	Mission to Mars (2000), film	NASA: Mars I Earth Return Vehicle (E.R.V.) Mars II/Mars Recovery Mission; Resupply Module (REMO) World Space Station (WSS)	June 9, 2020 – c. 2022
Maggie McConnell (USAF); Bjornstrom (Geologist) Mars 1: Luke Graham, Ph.D. (Commander); Sergei Kirov; Nicholas Willis; Reneé Coté Mars Recovery Mission: Woodrow "Woody" Blake (Commander); Jim McConnell (Copilot) (USAF); Terri Fisher; Phil Ohlmyer WSS: Ray Beck (NASA) (Mars Mission Control Room MMCR); Unnamed personnel	NASA astronauts on the first human mission to Mars and a follow-up mission to rescue them. Mars I launches June 10, 2020; landing in Cydonia. Jim McConnell previously landed crippled Block II Space Shuttle. Maggie and Jim McConnell were assigned as co-commanders of Mars I before Maggie became ill and died. Bjornstrom was originally assigned to Mars II but replaced by McConnell when it turned into Mars Recovery Mission.		
Kate Bowman, Cmdr. (USN); Quinn Burchenal, Dr. Bud Chantilas, Dr. Robby Gallagher; Chip Pettengil; Ted Santen, Lt.	Red Planet (2000), film	Mars-1	2057
Kate Bowman, Cmdr. (USN); Quinn Burchenal, Dr. Bud Chantilas, Dr. Robby Gallagher; Chip Pettengil; Ted Santen, Lt.	Commercially sponsored crew investigates reported oxygen reduction of automated terraforming of Mars. Solar flare complicates mission and landing crew are at mercy of rogue robot.		
Philip J. Fry	Futurama; The Luck of the Fryrish (2001), TV	Unknown	21st century
Philip J. Fry	The first human on Mars was the nephew and namesake of Philip J. Fry.		
NASA: Susan Dillard (Scientist) Ares 7/10: Kennedy "Hampster" Hampton (USN) (CDR); Alexis "Lex" Ohta, Ph.D. (USAF) (PLT); Valerie "Valkerie" Jansen, M.D., Ph.D. (MS1); Bob "Kaggo" Kaganovski, Ph.D. (MS2) Joshua Bennett, CAPCOM/Flight Director	Oxygen (2001), The Fifth Man (2002), novels	NASA: Ares 7/10: Mars Habitation Module (Hab); Mars Ascent Vehicle (MAV); Earth Return Vehicle (ERV) / Earth Landing Capsule (ELC)	August 14, 2012 – July 4, 2014 (Oxygen) March 16 – May 9, 2015 (The Fifth Man)
NASA: Susan Dillard (Scientist) Ares 7/10: Kennedy "Hampster" Hampton (USN) (CDR); Alexis "Lex" Ohta, Ph.D. (USAF) (PLT); Valerie "Valkerie" Jansen, M.D., Ph.D. (MS1); Bob "Kaggo" Kaganovski, Ph.D. (MS2) Joshua Bennett, CAPCOM/Flight Director	When first human mission to Mars sustains explosion en route, suspicion runs rampant among the crew that one of them is a saboteur. Launch on January 25, 2014; landing on July 3, 2014, at 30°S 95°E. Eight months later, crew confronts possibility of infection by Martian pathogen.		
Andre Vishniac (Captain); Susana "Susan" Sánchez (Pilot/Second-in-command); Luca Baglioni (Engineer); Jenny "Jen" Johnson (Physician); Fidel Rodrigo (Astrobiologist); Herbert Sagan (Geologist); Lowell (no first name given) (remains on Ares)	Stranded (2001), film	NASA/JPL/LMA/ESA: Ares Mission: Ares (orbital module); Bello (descent module)	2020
Andre Vishniac (Captain); Susana "Susan" Sánchez (Pilot/Second-in-command); Luca Baglioni (Engineer); Jenny "Jen" Johnson (Physician); Fidel Rodrigo (Astrobiologist); Herbert Sagan (Geologist); Lowell (no first name given) (remains on Ares)	Crew of first human Mars mission is stranded after descent module crash-lands near Martian equator and Valles Marineris. Sagan is first man on Mars.		
McCarthy (USAF) (Commander); Jeffries; Sally "Sal" Spirek (USAF) (Medic/Scientist); Ed Enright, Ph.D. (Geologist)	"Ulla, Ulla" (2002), short story	NASA: Fortitude	2019–2022
McCarthy (USAF) (Commander); Jeffries; Sally "Sal" Spirek (USAF) (Medic/Scientist); Ed Enright, Ph.D. (Geologist)	First human mission to Mars discovers strangely familiar technology from extinct civilization. McCarthy and Jeffries took part in return Moon mission in 2015. Mars landing on September 2, 2020, in Amazonis Planitia.		
Nelson Barnes, Capt. (USAF); Three unnamed astronauts	John Doe; Illegal Alien (2003), TV	United States Air Force: Mars Habitat One (Experimental)	February 3 – 7, 2003
Nelson Barnes, Capt. (USAF); Three unnamed astronauts	Astronaut testing technology for potential Mars mission staggers out of woods and is shot by teenager.		
Asaph Hall: Don Lawson; Sasim Remtulla Percival Lowell: Chuck Zakarian (Commander); Unnamed astronauts	"Mikeys" (2004), short story	NASA: Asaph Hall/Mike Collins Station; Percival Lowell	c. 2039
Asaph Hall: Don Lawson; Sasim Remtulla Percival Lowell: Chuck Zakarian (Commander); Unnamed astronauts	Arriving on Deimos ahead of planned Mars landing by Percival Lowell, Lawson and Remtulla make major discovery.		
Ares I: Ritter (Captain) (No first name given); Boris Ivanov (Pilot); Jeanne Monier (Engineering Physicist); Roel van Dijk (Planetary Physicist) Mars Trailblazer I: Poul Eriksen, Col. (AFSPC) (Captain); Jacques "Jack" Boutillier, Maj. (USMC Space Division) (Pilot); Linde Hoerter (Planetary atmosphere specialist); Nobuo Okita (Japan) (Nuclear Physicist/Engineer)	"Orbital Base Fear" (2004), short story	Consortium (NASA, ESA, Russian Federation, Japan): Mars Expedition I Consortium (ESA, Russian Federation): Ares I NASA/Air Force Space Command/Japan: Mars Trailblazer I/Orbital Base Phobos; Valkyrie (landing shuttle)	Future
Ares I: Ritter (Captain) (No first name given); Boris Ivanov (Pilot); Jeanne Monier (Engineering Physicist); Roel van Dijk (Planetary Physicist) Mars Trailblazer I: Poul Eriksen, Col. (AFSPC) (Captain); Jacques "Jack" Boutillier, Maj. (USMC Space Division) (Pilot); Linde Hoerter (Planetary atmosphere specialist); Nobuo Okita (Japan) (Nuclear Physicist/Engineer)	Seven years after failure of Mars Expedition I, Consortium and US crews race to be first on Mars. Trailblazer lands on Phobos near Stickney Crater.		
Two unnamed astronauts	Hametsu no Marusu (aka Mars of Destruction) (2005), anime	United States: Mars Exploration Vessel (aka Mars Exploratory Vessel)	2010
Two unnamed astronauts	Astronauts returning from Mars when spacecraft breaks up on reentry; after debris falls to Earth, hostile creatures called Ancients appear in Tokyo.		
Tom Houst	Tom on Mars (2005), short film	The Agency: Delta II	2049–2054
Tom Houst	After traveling to Mars alone on second human Mars mission, Houst is told that his girlfriend on Earth never existed.		
Sly Delta Honey	The Sea of Perdition (2006), short film	Mars Expedition	Future
Sly Delta Honey	Cosmonaut separated from expedition encounters strange creature on Mars.		
Glenn Hartwell (US) (Administrator) (International Space Development Agency); Max "Bull" Teller, (Note: Listed as Max "Bull" Haber in closing credits.) Dr. (US/ISDA) (CAPCOM) Project Olympus: Richard Erwin, Capt. (USN/ISDA) (Mission Commander); Mikhail Cerenkov, Maj. (Russian Air Force/ISDA) (Mission Pilot); Antoine Hébert, Dr. (EU – France/ISDA) (Mission Specialist – Flight Engineer [Nuclear Propulsion]); Jacqueline Decelles, Dr. (Canada/ISDA) (Mission Specialist – Robotics Engineer); Lucia Alarcon, Maj. (M.D.) (USAF/ISDA) (Mission Specialist – Flight Surgeon); Hiromi Okuda, Dr. (Japan/ISDA) (Mission Specialist – Astrobiologist)	Race to Mars (2007), TV	International Mars Partnership (IMP); Project Olympus: Shirase (Cargo Vehicle); Atlantis (MarsHab); Gagarin (Mars Ascent/Descent Vehicle); Terra Nova (Mars Transit Vehicle); Columbia (Earth Return Capsule)	September 12, 2026 – August 31, 2031
International crew racing Chinese to find water and life on Mars. Hartwell commanded first mission back to Moon; Erwin previously traveled to the Moon. Departure from Earth orbit on January 26, 2030; Mars landing on December 22, 2030, in Dao Vallis; return to Earth on August 31, 2031. Terra Nova is propelled by nuclear thermal rockets.
Barsoom Express: Jerry Beaden (USN) Tsiolkovski: Nathan Nesius (Captain); Carroway, Dr. (Physician) (no first name given); Michael Carroll; Unnamed French geologist ISS: Makarov, Col. (Russia) (no first name given); Unnamed personnel	Cathedral (2009), novelette	NASA: Barsoom Express; Tsiolkovski (aka Tsio) International Space Station; Soyuz	Near Future (Note: Beaden and his wife married in 2024.)
Barsoom Express: Jerry Beaden (USN) Tsiolkovski: Nathan Nesius (Captain); Carroway, Dr. (Physician) (no first name given); Michael Carroll; Unnamed French geologist ISS: Makarov, Col. (Russia) (no first name given); Unnamed personnel	Beaden fakes oxygen leak on Martian flyby mission to force landing on Mars and launch of rescue mission, kick-starting human exploration of Mars. Landing west of Olympus Mons.		
Zeus: Mike Goss (Mission Commander); Calliope: Ted Shaw; Maddux Donner; Sharon Lewis; Jeff Walker	Defying Gravity (2009), TV	International Space Organization (ISO); Mars 2042: Zeus; Calliope (Mars lander)	2042
Zeus: Mike Goss (Mission Commander); Calliope: Ted Shaw; Maddux Donner; Sharon Lewis; Jeff Walker	Calliope lands in Gusev Crater (at 14.6°S 173.5°E) with secret goal of recovering alien artifact. Walker becomes first human on Mars, but Shaw and Donner are forced to leave Lewis and Walker behind on surface due to dust storm.		
Adelaide Brooke, Cmdr. Ed Gold; Tarak Ital; Andy Stone; Margaret Cain; Mia Bennett; Yuri Kerenski; Steffi Ehrlich; Roman Groom	Doctor Who; The Waters of Mars (2009), TV	Apollo 34; Bowie Base One	November 21, 2059
Adelaide Brooke, Cmdr. Ed Gold; Tarak Ital; Andy Stone; Margaret Cain; Mia Bennett; Yuri Kerenski; Steffi Ehrlich; Roman Groom	First humans on Mars (contradicting earlier Doctor Who stories), menaced by a water-based Martian life-form and destined by history to die. Base located in Gusev Crater.		
Annie Norris, Col. (Commander); Tom Tyler, Maj. Sam Tyler; Ray Carling; Chris Skelton	Life on Mars; Life is a Rock (2009), TV	Aries Project: Hyde 1-2-5	2035
Annie Norris, Col. (Commander); Tom Tyler, Maj. Sam Tyler; Ray Carling; Chris Skelton	Crew travels to Mars in suspended animation, using "neural-stims" to keep brains occupied; as a result, Sam Tyler believes he is time-traveling NYPD detective.		
NASA: Mitchell Dodd (Scientist) Ares: Christopher Eugene Burke, Capt. (USAF) (Commander); Trisha "Trish" Merriday (USMC) (First Officer); Terry Kessler (Command Module Pilot); Owen "Beech" Beechum (Mission Specialist)	Offworld (2009), novel	Ares	2031 – 2033
NASA: Mitchell Dodd (Scientist) Ares: Christopher Eugene Burke, Capt. (USAF) (Commander); Trisha "Trish" Merriday (USMC) (First Officer); Terry Kessler (Command Module Pilot); Owen "Beech" Beechum (Mission Specialist)	NASA astronauts return from first human Mars mission to find Earth deserted.		
NASA: Norman Backus (Pilot); Roseanne Kim (Scientist); Denny (no last name given) Excelsior: James Rose, Capt. (Commander/Pilot); Jed Richards, Col. (First Officer); José Rodrigues (Science Officer) Geronimo: Steve Watanabe, Lt. (Pilot); Abu Jmil (First Officer); Deborah Quartz (Science Officer) Pequod: Brandon Lepper, Capt. (Pilot/Science Officer); Laurie Corelli, Capt. (First Officer); Arnold Gilmore, Dr. (Chief Medical Officer)	The Four Fingers of Death (2010), novel	NASA: Excelsior; Geronimo; Pequod; Earth Return Vehicle (ERV)	September 30, 2025 – October 2026
NASA: Norman Backus (Pilot); Roseanne Kim (Scientist); Denny (no last name given) Excelsior: James Rose, Capt. (Commander/Pilot); Jed Richards, Col. (First Officer); José Rodrigues (Science Officer) Geronimo: Steve Watanabe, Lt. (Pilot); Abu Jmil (First Officer); Deborah Quartz (Science Officer) Pequod: Brandon Lepper, Capt. (Pilot/Science Officer); Laurie Corelli, Capt. (First Officer); Arnold Gilmore, Dr. (Chief Medical Officer)	Small-time writer Montese Crandall novelizes 2025 remake of 1963 film The Crawling Hand (q.v.), adding back-story of first human Mars mission finding flesh-eating bacteria on Mars. Landing near Valles Marineris.		
Hank Morrison (Captain); Casey Cook, Dr. (New Zealand/ESA); Charlie Brownsville (NASA)	Mars (2010), film	NASA/ESA: Minerva 1	2015
Hank Morrison (Captain); Casey Cook, Dr. (New Zealand/ESA); Charlie Brownsville (NASA)	First human Mars mission is secretly financed by billionaire Morrison. Landing on November 29, 2015, in Terra Tyrrhena. Cook is first human on Mars. Brownsville made untethered EVA in 2010 to repair ion propulsion satellite.		
Perry Scott, Cmdr.	The Planeteer (2010), short film	NASA: Horizon I	April 22 – 25, 2010
Perry Scott, Cmdr.	Two-time Space Shuttle commander Scott helps eleven-year-old locate missing crew of first human Mars mission.		
Kim Yeun-ja (Korea) (Painter/Citizen-Astronaut) Kasei 18: Lynne Ann Morse (Flanders?) (Commander/Climatologist); Kabir Abuja (Nigeria) (Engineer); Audra Miskinis (Lithuania) (Paleobiologist); Gary Shu (Newsblogger/Citizen-Astronaut) Expedition 18: Nam Dae-jung (Korea) (Commander/Geochemist); Suma Handini (Pakistan) (Engineer); Li Huang (China) (Climatologist); Three unnamed astronauts	"Citizen-Astronaut" (2011), short story	United Nations Space Agency (UNSA): Kasei 18; Expedition 18	Future
Kim Yeun-ja (Korea) (Painter/Citizen-Astronaut) Kasei 18: Lynne Ann Morse (Flanders?) (Commander/Climatologist); Kabir Abuja (Nigeria) (Engineer); Audra Miskinis (Lithuania) (Paleobiologist); Gary Shu (Newsblogger/Citizen-Astronaut) Expedition 18: Nam Dae-jung (Korea) (Commander/Geochemist); Suma Handini (Pakistan) (Engineer); Li Huang (China) (Climatologist); Three unnamed astronauts	Shu replaces the injured Kim as the first Citizen-Astronaut to travel to Mars.		
Tom (Captain); Chandra (Medical Officer); Archie; Paolo; Rajuk (no last names given); Zoë Morrison, Dr. (Astrobotanist)	"Goodnight Moons" (2011), short story	NASA: Conestoga; Sacagawea (return vehicle)	Near Future
Tom (Captain); Chandra (Medical Officer); Archie; Paolo; Rajuk (no last names given); Zoë Morrison, Dr. (Astrobotanist)	Forty days into first human Mars mission, Morrison learns that she is pregnant.		
Unnamed astronaut	Last Flight (2011), short film	Unknown	2038
Unnamed astronaut	Lone survivor of Mars Base during nuclear war on Earth walks through Sinai Dorsa and Noctis Labyrinthus.		
Two unnamed astronauts	Mars (2011), short film	Eleanor (Unnamed fictional country) Unnamed lander (Unnamed fictional country)	Future
Two unnamed astronauts	Astronauts from different countries make first Mars landings nearly simultaneously.		
Fire Star: Wen Xiang (China) (Commander); Cooper Jackson (USA) (Flight Surgeon); Julie Davis (USA) (Biologist); Victoria Orlova, Prof. (Russia) (Astrophysicist); Junior Astronauts: Nicolas "Nico" Moreau (France); Aneesa Malik (India); Unnamed junior astronaut Mars Base I: Oscar Schweiger (Chief Mars Settlement Officer); Ivan (Scientist); Helena (Scientist); Gene (Staff engineer); Unnamed staff	Mars: You Decide How to Survive! (2011), gamebook	Fire Star; Mars Base I	Near Future
Fire Star: Wen Xiang (China) (Commander); Cooper Jackson (USA) (Flight Surgeon); Julie Davis (USA) (Biologist); Victoria Orlova, Prof. (Russia) (Astrophysicist); Junior Astronauts: Nicolas "Nico" Moreau (France); Aneesa Malik (India); Unnamed junior astronaut Mars Base I: Oscar Schweiger (Chief Mars Settlement Officer); Ivan (Scientist); Helena (Scientist); Gene (Staff engineer); Unnamed staff	Junior astronauts join mission to prepare Mars Base I for permanent colonists. Mars Base I located near Valles Marineris and Arsia Mons.		
Mars Mission: Unnamed commander Three unnamed astronauts	The Universe; Crash Landing on Mars (2011), TV	Mars Mission: Habitat module (Hab); Earth Return Vehicle (ERV); Mars Base Alpha Mars Mission 2	Near Future
Mars Mission: Unnamed commander Three unnamed astronauts	International crew crashes in eastern Valles Marineris after encountering Martian dust devil during landing.		
Zoe Barnes (Captain); Emma Turk, Cmdr. (First Officer); Emit Barnes, Dr. (Scientist); Rogers, Nurse (no first name given); Isaiah; Khan; Raj; Sam (no last names given); Unnamed astronauts	D.O.G.S. of Mars (2012), graphic novel	Department of Global Surveyors (D.O.G.S.): Mars Base Bowie	Future
Zoe Barnes (Captain); Emma Turk, Cmdr. (First Officer); Emit Barnes, Dr. (Scientist); Rogers, Nurse (no first name given); Isaiah; Khan; Raj; Sam (no last names given); Unnamed astronauts	Astronauts on mission to terraform Mars are attacked by nocturnal Martian creatures.		
Project Emergence: Bahe, Gen. (Navajo Nation); P. Clarke (Corporate Official); Unnamed guard Emergence: Tazbah Redhouse, Cdr. (Pilot) (Navajo Nation); Tobias Smith, Dr. (Omnicorn Corporation)	Futurestates; The 6th World: An Origin Story (2012), TV	International Space Station Project Emergence: Emergence	Future
Project Emergence: Bahe, Gen. (Navajo Nation); P. Clarke (Corporate Official); Unnamed guard Emergence: Tazbah Redhouse, Cdr. (Pilot) (Navajo Nation); Tobias Smith, Dr. (Omnicorn Corporation)	First mission to colonize Mars uses genetically engineered corn. Gen. Bahe is an experienced astronaut.		
NASA: Elma York, Dr.	The Lady Astronaut of Mars (2012), novelette "Rockets Red" (2015), short story	First Mars Expedition Longevity Mission	1952 – 1954 / 1980s (Alternate History) 1974 (Alternate History)
NASA: Elma York, Dr.	In alternate history in which asteroid struck Washington, D.C., in mid-20th century, York took part in First Mars Expedition in 1952. Thirty years later, she is chosen for Longevity Mission to exoplanet LS-579.		
J.T. (Canada) (no last name given)	Man On Mars (2012), short film	Unknown	Near Future
J.T. (Canada) (no last name given)	Astronaut launching for 506-day mission to Mars.		
Jeff (Scotland); Two unnamed astronauts	Phone Home (2012), short film	NASA	Future
Jeff (Scotland); Two unnamed astronauts	Astronaut calls his wife from Mars.		
Campbell (Commander) (no first name given); Craig Rowe (Pilot/Second-in-command); Amy DeLuca (Lander pilot); Tom Barischoff (Chief Engineer); Kristen Bradfield; Ed Carradine; Fumi Mashimo (Palaeobiologist); Chris Mendenhall; Claire O'Brian (Geophysicist); Aaron Rhodes; Lori Childs Rowe (Senior Planetary Scientist/Ice Miner/Engineer's Mate/Assistant Astrogator); Beth Young; Diana Cosatti; Frank Cosatti; Unnamed astronaut	"Taking the High Road" (2012), short story	NASA: Liberty; Mars Lander	April 12, 2037 – June 24, 2062
Campbell (Commander) (no first name given); Craig Rowe (Pilot/Second-in-command); Amy DeLuca (Lander pilot); Tom Barischoff (Chief Engineer); Kristen Bradfield; Ed Carradine; Fumi Mashimo (Palaeobiologist); Chris Mendenhall; Claire O'Brian (Geophysicist); Aaron Rhodes; Lori Childs Rowe (Senior Planetary Scientist/Ice Miner/Engineer's Mate/Assistant Astrogator); Beth Young; Diana Cosatti; Frank Cosatti; Unnamed astronaut	Mars-bound crew facing death due to fuel farm explosion on Mars changes course to match orbit with comet 10P/Tempel.		
Peter Bennett (Commander); Mark Riley, Capt. Alan Kenneth (Biologist)	Tin Can (2012), film	United States: Cercopes Mars Mission	Near Future
Peter Bennett (Commander); Mark Riley, Capt. Alan Kenneth (Biologist)	Astronauts on two-year Mars mission. Mission begins on July 21.		
Lisa	Animation Domination High-Def; The Dumbest Girl on Mars (2013), TV	NASA	Future
Lisa	Astronaut sent to establish Mars base stupidly takes off her helmet.		
A. Naut; B. Naut	Brickleberry; Trip to Mars (2013), TV	NASA: Apollo	Contemporary/Near Future (Spring)
A. Naut; B. Naut	NASA Mars landing is faked. 1969 Moon landing is also stated to have been faked.		
Unnamed Mission Commander; Three unnamed astronauts	Cloudy With a Chance of Meatballs 3: Planet of the Pies (2013), picture book	NASA	Contemporary/Near Future
Unnamed Mission Commander; Three unnamed astronauts	Astronauts discover a "thick, glutinous substance" falling from the sky on Mars.		
Bradley Emerson Elliott, Maj.	The Eye With Which The Universe Beholds Itself (2013), novella	Repurposed Skylab as transfer vehicle, with Apollo Lunar Module for the surface landing	1979 (Alternate History)
Bradley Emerson Elliott, Maj.	Mission to Mars based on RR Titus's Flyby-Landing Excursion Module proposal of 1966.		
Don Feinberg, Lt. Cmdr. (USN) (Captain); Shaw, Dr. (no first name given); Four unnamed astronauts	"How Was It Up There?" (2013), short short story	Intergalactic Space Mission	Future
Don Feinberg, Lt. Cmdr. (USN) (Captain); Shaw, Dr. (no first name given); Four unnamed astronauts	On 300-day Martian flyby mission, Shaw and Feinberg become first people to have intercourse in space. (Note: Author Jane Dreyfus is the former Jane Conrad.)		
Weber, Capt. (USMC) (no first name given) Ernesto Suarez	"The Lamplighter Legacy" (2013), short story	Unknown	September 15, 2021 / September 15, 2081
Weber, Capt. (USMC) (no first name given) Ernesto Suarez	Weber serves as technical advisor for billionaire James Lamplighter's launch of self-replicating 3D printer to asteroid 4660 Nereus, where it builds technology for Mars mission. Teenage blogger Suarez later travels to Nereus; his family later settles on Mars.		
Tantalus base: Charles Brunel (Canada) (Commander); Kim Aldrich (UK) (Geologist); Vincent Campbell (USA) (Chief Systems Officer); Lauren Dalby (UK) (Medic); Richard "Harry" Harrington (UK) (Communications); Robert Irwin (UK); Rebecca Lane (UK) (Biochemist); Marko Petrovic (Serbia) Aurora relief team: Unnamed astronauts	The Last Days on Mars (2013), film	International Space Commission (ISC): Aurora Mars Mission 2: Aurora; Tantalus base Aurora lander	Future
Tantalus base: Charles Brunel (Canada) (Commander); Kim Aldrich (UK) (Geologist); Vincent Campbell (USA) (Chief Systems Officer); Lauren Dalby (UK) (Medic); Richard "Harry" Harrington (UK) (Communications); Robert Irwin (UK); Rebecca Lane (UK) (Biochemist); Marko Petrovic (Serbia) Aurora relief team: Unnamed astronauts	Martian explorers discover life, with disastrous results.		
Unnamed commander Three unnamed astronauts	Mousetronaut Goes to Mars (2013), picture book	NASA: Galaxy Rocket; Mars landing craft	Near Future
Unnamed commander Three unnamed astronauts	Mouse named Meteor becomes first Earthling on Mars after landing craft engine fails, preventing human crew from landing. Sequel to Mousetronaut: Based on a (Partially) True Story (q.v.).		
Kirk "Andy" Anderson (Pilot) Orbital Seven: Drew Bantry (Commander); Kristen Zhang; Unnamed personnel	"The Promise of Space" (2013), short story	Spaceways: Unknown (Mars missions); Orbital Seven	c. 2030s – June 2051
Kirk "Andy" Anderson (Pilot) Orbital Seven: Drew Bantry (Commander); Kristen Zhang; Unnamed personnel	Anderson, the first man on Phobos and veteran of two Mars missions, develops Alzheimer's-like symptoms after flying rescue mission to Orbital Seven during solar flare.		
Samuel Michaels, Capt. (Commander)	Among the Stars (2014), short film	Artemis-939	Future
Samuel Michaels, Capt. (Commander)	Sole survivor of mission to establish life on Mars records final message in escape pod.		
Unnamed astronaut	Delivery from Earth (2014), short film	Unknown	Future
Unnamed astronaut	Astronaut from Gallup, New Mexico is first person to give birth on Mars.		
Diomedes 1: Mark Allen (Mission Commander); Daniel Pryor (Biosystems Engineer); Emily Turner (Mars Module Pilot)	Delta-V (2014), short film	NASA: Project Diomedes	Near Future
Diomedes 1: Mark Allen (Mission Commander); Daniel Pryor (Biosystems Engineer); Emily Turner (Mars Module Pilot)	Former Space Shuttle commander Allen is offered one-way flight to Mars.		
Shuttle 1: Phil Miller (Pilot); Steven Drake, Dr.	Last Sunrise (2014), short film	Micronesia Unilateral Space Fund (MUSF): RedThesis (Mars colony); Shuttle 1 Shuttle 2 Phobos Base Control Center	Near Future
Shuttle 1: Phil Miller (Pilot); Steven Drake, Dr.	Astronaut from colony featured in reality TV show is running out of oxygen on Martian surface. Colony located in Hellas Planitia.		
Gloria "Glory Hallelujah" Hazeltine (Mission Commander); Ernie Roebuck (Chief Communications Engineer); Unnamed lead biologist Unnamed astronauts Excursion 3 (E-3): Patrick O'Connor (Team Leader); Jacob "Jake" Bernstein (Geologist); Rashid Faiyum (Geologist)	"Mars Farts" (2014), short story	Unknown	Late 21st century (after 2076)
Gloria "Glory Hallelujah" Hazeltine (Mission Commander); Ernie Roebuck (Chief Communications Engineer); Unnamed lead biologist Unnamed astronauts Excursion 3 (E-3): Patrick O'Connor (Team Leader); Jacob "Jake" Bernstein (Geologist); Rashid Faiyum (Geologist)	After meteor shower, Excursion 3 team is stranded near Viking 2 landing site in Utopia Planitia. Mission base at Tithonium Chasma; Excursion 1 site near Olympus Mons.		
Ares 1: Karen Rhodes (Mechanical Engineer) Ares 3: Melissa Lewis (USN) (Commander/Geologist); Rick Martinez, Maj. (Pilot); Chris Beck, Dr. (Physician/Biologist/EVA Specialist); Beth Johanssen (Sysop/Reactor Tech); Alex Vogel (Germany/European Union) (Chemist/Navigator); Mark Richard Watney, (Note: Middle name given in film only.) Ph.D. (Botanist/Mechanical Engineer)	The Martian (2014), novel; The Martian (2015), film "Diary of an AssCan: A Mark Watney Short Story" (2015), short story	NASA: Ares 1 Ares 3: Hermes; Mars Descent Vehicle (MDV); Mars Ascent Vehicle (MAV)	2035
Ares 1: Karen Rhodes (Mechanical Engineer) Ares 3: Melissa Lewis (USN) (Commander/Geologist); Rick Martinez, Maj. (Pilot); Chris Beck, Dr. (Physician/Biologist/EVA Specialist); Beth Johanssen (Sysop/Reactor Tech); Alex Vogel (Germany/European Union) (Chemist/Navigator); Mark Richard Watney, Ph.D. (Botanist/Mechanical Engineer)	Sandstorm forces crew to evacuate landing site in Acidalia Planitia, leaving Watney, who is erroneously believed dead, stranded on Mars. In the film Martinez is also a member of the Ares V crew. (Note: According to Andy Weir on the film's DVD commentary, the Chinese astronaut aboard Ares V is named "Wei".)		
Bart Saxby (NASA chief administrator); Nathan Brice (Flight Director) Arrow: Benson "Bee" Benson (Canada) (Command Pilot); Ted Connover, Ph.D. (USAF) (Pilot); Catherine Clermont, Dr. (France) (Geologist); Virginia "Jinny" Gonzalez (Communications Specialist); Amanda "Mandy" Lynn (USA) (Biologist); Hiram "Hi" McPherson (Geologist); Taki Nomura, Dr. (Japan) (Physician/Psychologist); Mikhail "Mike" Prokhorov (Russia) (Meteorologist)	Rescue Mode (2014), novel	NASA: Arrow; Hercules (Mars lander); Fermi (uncrewed lander/surface habitation module)	August 2032 – December 2035
Bart Saxby (NASA chief administrator); Nathan Brice (Flight Director) Arrow: Benson "Bee" Benson (Canada) (Command Pilot); Ted Connover, Ph.D. (USAF) (Pilot); Catherine Clermont, Dr. (France) (Geologist); Virginia "Jinny" Gonzalez (Communications Specialist); Amanda "Mandy" Lynn (USA) (Biologist); Hiram "Hi" McPherson (Geologist); Taki Nomura, Dr. (Japan) (Physician/Psychologist); Mikhail "Mike" Prokhorov (Russia) (Meteorologist)	First human Mars mission is imperiled by meteoroid impact. Saxby and Brice are former astronauts; Connover is an ISS and International Moon Base veteran. Launch from Earth orbit on April 5, 2035; landing on November 5, 2035, in Elysium Planitia.		
Ned Crater (Commander); Flo Comet (Engineer); Alex Nova (Lander Pilot); Izzy Stardust (Science Officer); Lem Cosmos (Engineer)	Space Quest: Mission to Mars (2014), picture book	Space Quest: Unnamed rocket Ramesses; Memphis (Mars lander)	2050
Ned Crater (Commander); Flo Comet (Engineer); Alex Nova (Lander Pilot); Izzy Stardust (Science Officer); Lem Cosmos (Engineer)	Astronauts land on Mars as first stage of mission to explore Solar System. Landing near Valles Marineris.		
Unnamed commander Tom Richwood, Sgt. Maj. (Pilot/Systems Engineering Specialist); Rusham Haroun, Dr. (Bioscience Officer); Angela Olvera; Mikhail Dankov	Castle; The Wrong Stuff (2015), TV	Mars 2018 Project: Tenzing Norgay (simulator)	Contemporary
Unnamed commander Tom Richwood, Sgt. Maj. (Pilot/Systems Engineering Specialist); Rusham Haroun, Dr. (Bioscience Officer); Angela Olvera; Mikhail Dankov	Navy and NASA veteran Richwood is murdered during simulation of privately funded mission to Martian northern lowlands.		
Samuel Ko	"The Drones" (2015), short short story	Unknown	Future
Samuel Ko	First man on Mars arrives in shelter built by insect-like drones.		
T. Rymann; S. Hartley	Mars 299 792 458 m s 1 (2015), short film	France	December 9, 2034
T. Rymann; S. Hartley	Chaotic situation on Mars.		
Ed (no last name given)	MARS-3 (2015), short film	Mars X	December 2, 1971 / 2038
Ed (no last name given)	Astronaut seeking to recover data from Soviet Mars 3 lander in Ptolemaeus Crater.		
Taylor Richards (Orbiter pilot) "Hud" Hudson; Bowman	Red Mission (2015), short film	Mars Red II (Recon Orbiter/Lander)	July 19, 2053
Taylor Richards (Orbiter pilot) "Hud" Hudson; Bowman	After Hudson and Bowman make first human landing on Mars, all three astronauts are abducted and placed in artificial Earth-like environment.		
Anuli (NASA) (M1); Gil (ISSM)	Red Pearl (2015), short film	Orion; International Space Station Mars (ISSM); Mars habitat	2040
Anuli (NASA) (M1); Gil (ISSM)	US astronaut who grew up in Nigeria explores rim of Victoria Crater. Space station is similar to ISS, but in Martian orbit.		
Phoenix: Karie Chen (Commander); Unnamed pilot Three unnamed scientists Pilgrim 2: Daniel Chen; Four unnamed astronauts Pilgrim 3: Karie Chen; Jonah Brennerman; James Krueger; Treva Hilgar	"Tribute" (2015), short story	NASA: Phoenix; Pilgrim 1 (Mars habitat); Pilgrim 2 Nova Branson Corporation: Pilgrim 3	c. 2050
Phoenix: Karie Chen (Commander); Unnamed pilot Three unnamed scientists Pilgrim 2: Daniel Chen; Four unnamed astronauts Pilgrim 3: Karie Chen; Jonah Brennerman; James Krueger; Treva Hilgar	Deaths of Pilgrim 2 crew end human spaceflight by NASA; Daniel Chen's sister Karie follows him to Mars on privately funded mission. Karie Chen previously commanded Phoenix mission to asteroid placed in lunar orbit. Krueger and Hilgar are former NASA astronauts.		
Zephyr: William D. Stanaforth, Capt. Boreas: Emily Maddox, Capt. Endurance: Worsley (Captain); Greenstreet (no first names given)	Approaching the Unknown (2016), film	Romulus Mission: Zephyr; Boreas Endurance (space station)	Near Future
Zephyr: William D. Stanaforth, Capt. Boreas: Emily Maddox, Capt. Endurance: Worsley (Captain); Greenstreet (no first names given)	Astronauts on one-way trip to Mars in separate spacecraft.		
European Space Programme: Angelo Chavez (US); Marlon Habila, Dr. (Nigeria) New Dawn: Toby Soyinka (Second communications officer) (UK); Unnamed astronauts Second Wind: Vinnie Cameron; Zhanna Sorokina; Ken Toh; Jocelyn Tooker	The Art of Space Travel (2016), novelette	European Space Programme: New Dawn; Hoffnung 3 (space station) Second Wind	2047 c. 2077
European Space Programme: Angelo Chavez (US); Marlon Habila, Dr. (Nigeria) New Dawn: Toby Soyinka (Second communications officer) (UK); Unnamed astronauts Second Wind: Vinnie Cameron; Zhanna Sorokina; Ken Toh; Jocelyn Tooker	New Dawn, launched for Mars in June 2047, exploded, killing its crew. Thirty years later, Second Wind crew prepares for second attempted Mars mission.		
Eli Cologne	First Man on Mars (2016), film	Cologne Space Labs	October 23, 2003 – 2005
Eli Cologne	Billionaire Cologne returns from self-funded Mars mission as monster and terrorizes Louisiana bayou.		
Daedalus: Ben Sawyer (Mission Commander/Systems Engineer) (United States); Hana Seung (Mission Pilot/Systems Engineer) (United States); Marta Kamen, Dr. (Exobiologist/Geologist) (Russia); Robert Foucault, Ph.D. (Mechanical Engineer/Roboticist) (Nigeria); Javier Delgado (Geochemist/Hydrologist) (Spain); Amelie Durand (Mission Physician/Biochemist) (France) Joon Seung (United States) (CAPCOM) (subsequently IMSF Secretary General) Vega: Jane; Unnamed personnel Cygnus: Unnamed pilot Leslie Richardson, Dr. (Phase Two director/nuclear physicist); Paul J. Richardson, Dr. (Ethnobotanist); Oliver Lee; Ava Macon; Unnamed personnel Arrival ship unspecified: Sam; Nick; Jake; Alex; Victor; Gout; Golokov; Wilkes; Garmash; Turtle; Solet	Mars (2016–2018), TV	International Mars Science Foundation (IMSF)/Mars Mission Corporation (MMC): Daedalus; Vega; Cygnus; Olympus Town (settlement)	2033 – 2037
Mission to establish first colony on Mars. Initial landing by Daedalus in Valles Marineris in 2033. Sawyer and Seung are NASA veterans.
Mars II: Four unnamed astronauts Mars IV: Julie Lafarge (France) (Astrophysicist/Pilot); Eliott; Frank; Lisa (no last names given for last three)	Mars IV (2016), short film	United Nations Space Agency (U.N.S.A): Mars II Mars IV: Rocketship X-M	2047 2053
Mars II: Four unnamed astronauts Mars IV: Julie Lafarge (France) (Astrophysicist/Pilot); Eliott; Frank; Lisa (no last names given for last three)	Mars II crew fell into comas due to "the Red", a psychological condition, and were sent back to Earth. Six years later, with less than a week to go in their mission, Mars IV crew discover valuable gold deposit and begin hallucinating.		
Achilles: Lee Maynard, Lt Col. (Commander); Emma Grant Ares 5: Francois (no last names given) (Note: Dropped from mission to allow Maynard/Grant to return on Ares 5.); Shiela (no last names given) (Note: Dropped from mission to allow Maynard/Grant to return on Ares 5); 4 unnamed astronauts	"Steel Eye" (2016), short story	Ares Program: Ares 4 (Note: Comprises an Orion command module, an Endurance habitation module and an Earth Return Engine.); Achilles Ares 5 Equinox (Mars habitat)	Near Future
Achilles: Lee Maynard, Lt Col. (Commander); Emma Grant Ares 5: Francois (no last names given); Shiela (no last names given); 4 unnamed astronauts	NASA astronauts on the first human orbital mission to Mars, who find themselves faced with an agonizing choice when the engine that was supposed to allow their return to Earth fails.		
Theresa Clarke, Capt. (Canada) (Commander); Dominique Henry, Dr. (OG-GYN) (United States); Li Rong, Dr. (China) (Planetologist); Laima Miškinis (Lithuania); Renata Romero (Mexico); Seven unnamed astronauts Aloysius Koch	Women Are from Mars (2016), web series	The SisterShip Mars Colonizing Mission: Deja Thoris [sic]	Near Future ("Stardate 7.3")
Theresa Clarke, Capt. (Canada) (Commander); Dominique Henry, Dr. (OG-GYN) (United States); Li Rong, Dr. (China) (Planetologist); Laima Miškinis (Lithuania); Renata Romero (Mexico); Seven unnamed astronauts Aloysius Koch	12-woman crew (six scientists, six civilians) on one-way trip to colonize Mars. Clarke is an experienced astronaut.		
Dave Nicholson (Chief Commander); Unnamed astronauts	Black Holes: How Embarrassing To Be Human (2017), short film	NASA: Mars Premium	Contemporary/Near Future (Note: The date "August 12, 1974" appears on Nicholson's astronaut certificate, but this is apparently a mistake.)
Dave Nicholson (Chief Commander); Unnamed astronauts	Nicholson and sentient seedless melon are slated to fly first human Mars mission. Proof of concept for TV series.		
Kate Winship (Geologist); Ryan; Svetlana; Dave (no last names given); Two unnamed astronauts	"Feldspar" (2017), short story	NASA: Eos	Future
Kate Winship (Geologist); Ryan; Svetlana; Dave (no last names given); Two unnamed astronauts	First human landing on Mars; Eos Base Camp established in mouth of Valles Marineris. Winship is injured near mouth of Maja Vallas on excursion to Chryse Planitia; Earth-based rover operator comes to her aid, guiding her to shelter near Dromore crater.		
Adam Hummingbird Freager, Col.	Great Planes of World War 3: Prologue (2017), short film	Ares One	Future
Adam Hummingbird Freager, Col.	Sole survivor of Mars landing is stranded on Mars when Earth is destroyed by nuclear war and asteroid impact.		
Robert Liu, Dr. (CNSA) (Mission Commander/Chemical Engineer); Namusisi "Sissy" Biira, Dr. (African Space Research Program [ASRP]) (Astrosociologist/Psychiatrist); Lucien Pascal Gans, (Note: Listed as "Lucien Gas [sic] Pascal" in closing credits.) Dr. (ESA) (Biochemist/Physician); Elvis Price Johnson, Dr. (Google Space Initiative [GSI]) (Computers and Communications); Kathryn "Kat" Voss, Dr. (NASA) (Astrophysicist/Climatologist)	One Under the Sun (2017), film	Samsara Mission	c. 2039
Robert Liu, Dr. (CNSA) (Mission Commander/Chemical Engineer); Namusisi "Sissy" Biira, Dr. (African Space Research Program [ASRP]) (Astrosociologist/Psychiatrist); Lucien Pascal Gans, Dr. (ESA) (Biochemist/Physician); Elvis Price Johnson, Dr. (Google Space Initiative [GSI]) (Computers and Communications); Kathryn "Kat" Voss, Dr. (NASA) (Astrophysicist/Climatologist)	Voss is lone survivor of international Mars mission after spacecraft is destroyed by missile during reentry.		
Four unnamed astronauts	Others Will Follow (2017), short film	NASA	Early 2000s
Four unnamed astronauts	Spacecraft breaks apart on approach to Mars, leaving only one survivor.		
Will Sacks (Commander); Dane; Thom Jason; Julia Meyers; Luke Millens; Nelly Rugin	The Tank (2017), film	NASA: Ice-Sat 5	2012
Will Sacks (Commander); Dane; Thom Jason; Julia Meyers; Luke Millens; Nelly Rugin	Crew of NASA Antarctic habitat on 12-month Mars analog mission.		
Jason Webber (Commander); Maschio Salvatore (1st Officer); Gordon Spark, Dr. Alexander Chen, Tech Sgt.	VanLadyLove: Mars: A Musical Odyssey (2017), music video	VLL (United States)	Future
Jason Webber (Commander); Maschio Salvatore (1st Officer); Gordon Spark, Dr. Alexander Chen, Tech Sgt.	Musician crew of Mars mission space dive to Martian surface. Music video for end credit song from Magellan (2017).		
MarsNOW: Sergei Kuznetzov (Russia) (Co-Commander); Helen Kane (US) (Co-Commander); Yoshihiro "Yoshi" Tanaka (JAXA) (Co-Commander) Backup crew: Dev Patek (US); Nora (US); Ty (US) (no last names given for last two) Weilai 3: Yu Chen; Meifeng Guo; He Liu; Mingli Sheng	The Wanderers (2017), novel	Prime Space; MarsNOW: Eidolon (mission simulation) Primitus (Earth-to-Mars vehicle); Red Dawn (Earth Return Vehicle); Red Dawn II (contingency ERV) CNSA: Weilai 3	Near Future
MarsNOW: Sergei Kuznetzov (Russia) (Co-Commander); Helen Kane (US) (Co-Commander); Yoshihiro "Yoshi" Tanaka (JAXA) (Co-Commander) Backup crew: Dev Patek (US); Nora (US); Ty (US) (no last names given for last two) Weilai 3: Yu Chen; Meifeng Guo; He Liu; Mingli Sheng	Astronauts undertake 17-month simulated Mars mission for private company; simulated landing near Arsia Mons. Meanwhile, Weilai 3 crew die in cockpit fire on way to Moon. All three members of MarsNOW prime crew are ISS veterans; Tanaka and former ISS commander Kuznetzov are NEEMO veterans. Former NASA astronaut Kane flew with cosmonaut named Yusef on her second ISS mission.		
Genesis One: William O'Connor, (Note: Referred to as both "O'Connor" and "Keaton".) Col. (CDR); Raymond Jackson, Capt. (USAF); Samantha "Sammy" Strickland (First Commander); Ben "Benny" Brooks, Lt. Emma "Ems" Hudson, Chief (USAF) (Engineer); Kôji "Shiro" Yushiro, Dr. (Physician)	Another Plan from Outer Space (aka The Doomed) (2018), film	NASA/U.S. Space Fleet; Genesis One (Space Shuttle) Mars colony	2024 July 7–8, 1947
Genesis One: William O'Connor, Col. (CDR); Raymond Jackson, Capt. (USAF); Samantha "Sammy" Strickland (First Commander); Ben "Benny" Brooks, Lt. Emma "Ems" Hudson, Chief (USAF) (Engineer); Kôji "Shiro" Yushiro, Dr. (Physician)	Astronauts returning from bringing colonists to Mars crash-land on Earth.		
Aleksandr Chapaev (Russia) (Commander); Two unnamed astronauts	Forsaken (a.k.a. Forsaken: Mission Mars, Mission Mars, Stranded On Mars) (2018), film	International Mars Mission	Near Future
Aleksandr Chapaev (Russia) (Commander); Two unnamed astronauts	First human mission to Mars fails due to a severe dust storm; Chapaev saves his crew but crashes on landing, stranded on Mars. Pilot/second-in-command is Maksim Surayev.		
Molly Jennis	Spaceman (2018), play	United States	Near Future
Molly Jennis	Astronaut on solo, corporate-sponsored mission to Mars.		
Jake Wilson (Commander); Jill Valentine; Four unnamed crewmembers	2036 Origin Unknown (2018), film	United States Planetary Corporation (U.S.P.C.): Martian One	2030 2036
Jake Wilson (Commander); Jill Valentine; Four unnamed crewmembers	Six years after Wilson's death in spacecraft crash on Mars, his daughter and an advanced AI attempt to unravel a mystery.		
Unnamed astronaut	Eleven (2019), short film	NASA	Near Future
Unnamed astronaut	Astronaut leaving on six-year solo mission to Mars says goodbye to his five-year-old daughter.		
Orion/Mars mission: Three unnamed astronauts DSG: Two unnamed astronauts	Rendezvous with Mars (2019), short film	NASA: Orion/Space Launch System; DSG; Mars mission	Near Future
Orion/Mars mission: Three unnamed astronauts DSG: Two unnamed astronauts	Young girl from Bombay grows up to fly to Mars.		
Macgregor Red Team Three: Charlie Shaw (Commander); Lewis Staples (Pilot/Number two); Samantha Ransom (Number three); Mathias DeClerk (Number four); James Weston (Number five)	Thalamos (2019), short film	ISEA; Zubrin Research Station (ZRS): M.A.R.S. III (Red Team Three)	Near Future
Macgregor Red Team Three: Charlie Shaw (Commander); Lewis Staples (Pilot/Number two); Samantha Ransom (Number three); Mathias DeClerk (Number four); James Weston (Number five)	Shaw becomes separated from his crew 182 days into 18-month stay on Zubrin Research Station in Mars orbit. Macgregor was a member of the previous ZRS crew.		
Alexa Brandt (Commander); Casey Donlin (Pilot); Rei Tanaka (Flight Engineer); Katherine Langford (Flight Surgeon); Jerry Pierson (Mission Specialist)	The Twilight Zone; Six Degrees of Freedom (2019), TV	United States (NASA): Bradbury Heavy Mission	Near Future
Alexa Brandt (Commander); Casey Donlin (Pilot); Rei Tanaka (Flight Engineer); Katherine Langford (Flight Surgeon); Jerry Pierson (Mission Specialist)	The crew of a spacecraft, led by Alexa Brandt, decide to head for the planet Mars after a nuclear war breaks out on Earth. The crew members soon begin to turn on one another, in spite of Brandt's attempts to convince them to come together under times of stress. However, she too begins to break, devastating fellow crew member Katherine Langford. One crewman, Jerry Pierson, goes crazy and starts rambling that they are being watched, but the other crewmen do not believe him. Later on, he is seemingly killed just as the crew successfully land on Mars. It is later revealed that Jerry had been taken away by aliens and that he was correct: aliens have been monitoring the crew trying to determine if they are worth saving and if humanity were better off if his ideas were to happen.		
Miller (Commander) (no first name given); Billy (Co-pilot) (no last name given)	The Edge (2020), short film	NASA: Edge-124	2050
Miller (Commander) (no first name given); Billy (Co-pilot) (no last name given)	First two astronauts to fly to Mars; meteoroid impact causes them to crash on distant planet. Launch on April 12, 2050.		
Sojouner-1 (NASA): Danielle Poole (Mission Commander); Kelly Baldwing (Mission Specialist); Will Tyler (Mission Specialist); Roland Baranov (USSR-US): Mission Specialist; Sylvie Kaplan (Mission Specialist); Clarke Halladay (UK): Mission Specialist Mars 94 (ROSKOSMOS); Gregory Kuznetsov (Mission Commander); Dmitry Mayakovsky (Physician); Alexei Poletov (Mission Specialist); Isabel Castillo (Cuba): Mission Specialist; Unnamed cosmonaut (dead)
Sojouner-1 (NASA): Danielle Poole (Mission Commander); Kelly Baldwing (Mission Specialist); Will Tyler (Mission Specialist); Roland Baranov (USSR-US): Mission Specialist; Sylvie Kaplan (Mission Specialist); Clarke Halladay (UK): Mission Specialist Mars 94 (ROSKOSMOS); Gregory Kuznetsov (Mission Commander); Dmitry Mayakovsky (Physician); Alexei Poletov (Mission Specialist); Isabel Castillo (Cuba): Mission Specialist; Unnamed cosmonaut (dead)	For All Mankind (2024), TV	NASA: Sojouner-1 ROSKOSMOS: Mars-94	1992
First crewed mission to mars in alternative 1992. Soviet Mars 94 crew was rescued by Sojouner-1 american crew. Three astronauts (2 american and 1 soviet) was killed during rescue operations and soviet survivor was integrated in Sojouner crew. Mission landed in Mars in 1992
