= Fifth Man =

Fifth Man may refer to:

- "The Fifth Man" (Stargate SG-1), an episode of Stargate SG-1
- The Fifth Man, a 1946 novel by Manning Coles
- The Fifth Man (novel), a 2002 novel by John B. Olson and Randall S. Ingermanson
- the unknown member of the Cambridge Five (aka the Cambridge Four), a ring of Soviet spies
