= VAN HØF =

American band

- Origin: Provo, Utah, United States
- Genres: Rock
- Years active: 2012–present
- Label: 2015-present Cinch Records
- Members: Travis Van Hoff; Steele Saldutti; Chris Petty
- Past members: Caleb Loveless; Christopher White; John Buckner; Jordan Clark
- Website: vanladylove.com

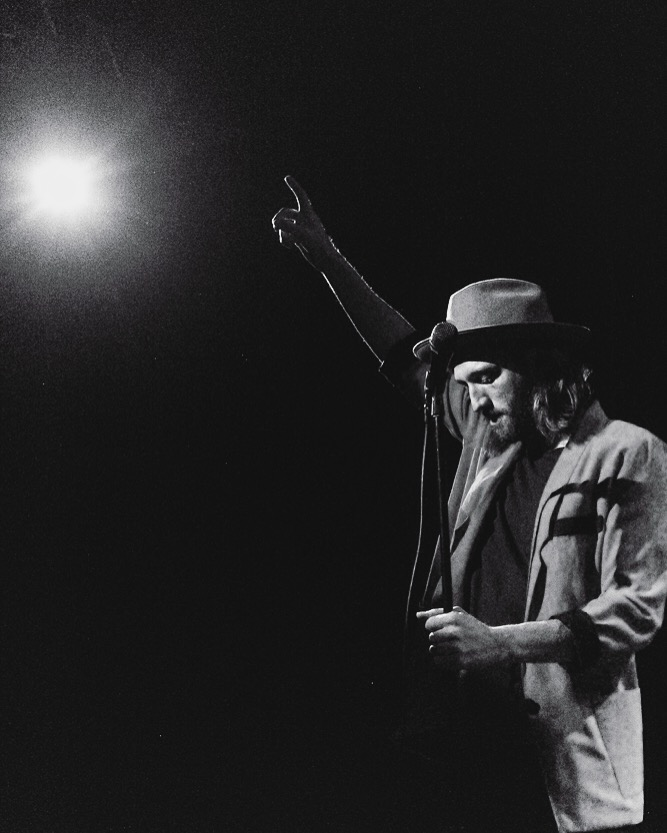
Lead singer, Travis Van Hoff during a 2016 concert

VAN HØF (formerly VanLadyLove) is an American indie rock/pop/alternative band from Provo, Utah. The band also has roots in Arizona, California and Utah. VanLadyLove was formed in 2012. Their first live show was opening for the band Parachute, after which they quickly gained a local following in Utah, which has begun to spread throughout the United States and Europe. VanLadyLove has opened for other prominent acts like Train, Portugal the Man, The Avett Brothers, Cold War Kids, Blink 182, Zella Day, Coasts, Tyrone Wells, Cody Simpson, Tyler Ward, and Dave Barnes.

VanLadyLove won the "#1 Artist on the Verge 2014" award, a national honor given by a team of top A&R scouts, talent buyers, booking agents, media taste-makers and other industry experts at the New Music Seminar's in New York City.

Their first album Love Matter was released February 17, 2014. The album received recognition after receiving key placements on national television. This, along with a viral music video for the song "Neverland", triggered the band to chart on iTunes.

Industry professionals noticed the buzz and invited VanLadyLove to participate in the New Music Seminar in New York City. They went on to become the New Music Seminar’s, 2014 Artist On the Verge. VanLadyLove was chosen for this award by a team of leading A&R scouts, talent buyers, booking agents, media taste-makers and other industry experts. As the year came to a close, the album was selected for VH1's "Staff Picks of 2014" and received 2014 Utah Music Awards Best Pop Band and Best Album of the year.

Following the departure of guitarist Jordan Clark towards the end of 2017, the remaining three members (Travis Van Hoff, Steele Saldutti, and Matt Wilson) rebranded themselves as VAN HØF. They claimed that this was to help transition their lineup, strategies, and goals. The new incarnation takes influence from bands such as Young the Giant, Cage the Elephant, Phantogram, the Black Keys, Coldplay, Radiohead, Imagine Dragons, Everything Everything, the Neighbourhood, and the Killers.

VAN HØF began recording a new album at Green Day's Jingletown Studios in Oakland, California.

== Band members ==
VAN HØF is made up of Van Hoff (vocals/guitar/keys), Saldutti (bass/synthesizers), and Matt Wilson (drums). Members of VanLadyLove included Van Hoff (vocals), Jordan Clark (guitar), Saldutti (bass), Chris Petty (drums), Caleb Loveless, Christopher White, and John Buckner.

== Discography ==
- Love Matter (2014)
1. "Alibi"
2. "Bottle of Bad Ideas"
3. "Don't Be Afraid"
4. "Moves Me"
5. "West Coast Dancer"
6. "Neverland"
