= Cinch Records =

English record label

Cinch was an English record label in the 78-rpm era, publishing cheap records at or below cost, for the purpose of driving out competitors. It was anonymously run by His Master's Voice, and operated between 1913 and 1916. A brief history and full record listing is published by the City of London Phonograph and Gramophone Society (CLPGS) in their Reference Series of books.
