= Oxygen (Olson and Ingermanson novel) =

2001 novel by John B. Olson and Randall S. Ingermanson

- Author: John B. Olson and Randall S. Ingermanson
- Cover artist: Lookout Design Group, Inc. (actual person uncredited)
- Language: English
- Genre: Science fiction
- Publisher: Bethany House
- Publication date: 2001
- Publication place: United States
- Media type: Print (Paperback)
- Pages: 365 (paperback edition)
- ISBN: 978-0-7642-2442-3 (paperback edition)
- OCLC: 47057449
- Dewey Decimal: 813/.6 21
- LC Class: PS3615.L75 O95 2001

Oxygen is a 2001 futuristic Christian novel by John B. Olson and Randall S. Ingermanson.

== Plot ==
=== Beginning ===
As the novel begins, Dr. Valerie ("Valkerie") Jansen is on a field trip on the slope of Mount Trident on the Alaska Peninsula. In real life, this volcano has not erupted for many years—but in the novel, Mount Trident vents sulfur dioxide into the air, and this gas settles into the valley where Valkerie is encamped. She barely survives the experience, at one point taking the air from the tires of her Jeep, which is the only air available for her to breathe.

The next morning, the Chief Administrator of NASA, together with one of NASA's senior physicians, lands on the slope of Mount Trident in a helicopter. They are looking for Valkerie, because they wish to interview her for a position as an Astronaut Candidate. The conversation that follows is very confusing to both sides, chiefly because Valkerie is convinced that Mount Trident is about to erupt and all three must evacuate at once. Eventually, however, Valkerie climbs aboard the helicopter with the two NASA officials.

Eventually she is summoned to Houston, Texas, and reports for training at NASA's headquarters complex. A dispute between the NASA Administrator and Nate Harrington, the Mars Mission Director, results in her beginning a training regimen that is more difficult than usual, leading her to believe that Harrington wants her removed from the program. NASA officials are impressed with her academic record and her ability to cope with "five-sigma" days—days characterized by a series of crises, often involving life-threatening situations (for example, surviving a fumarolic venting incident by breathing the air from her Jeep's tires). Harrington's primary concern is gaining the NASA Administrator's respect for his authority as Mars Mission Director. He is also distracted by a series of events unrelated to Valkerie or her candidacy.

Nate's distractions include: a serious budget problem that has forced NASA to sell exclusive broadcast rights to a major television network, a clear threat from a prominent US Senator that he "has the votes" to terminate NASA's flagship program, a compromise of project security that darkly suggests a terrorist plot against NASA (and requires him to have an FBI agent as a semi-regular on the NASA campus)--and a controversy involving the crew selection for Ares 10, which is to be the first crewed mission to Mars. NASA's psychiatrists have abruptly demanded interviews with all members of the Ares 10 crew—Josh Bennett, Kennedy Hampton, Alexis "Lex" Ohta, and Bob "Kaggo" Kaganovski. Bob in particular fears that the psychiatrists want to remove him from the crew—because he has never felt entirely secure in his position, mainly because he does not have the devil-may-care abandon that is part of the "astronaut stereotype" and which Kennedy displays in overabundance. So when the psychiatrists call him in for an interview, he tells them that he would gladly obey any order given him by Josh, the assigned mission commander—not mentioning that he always reserves the right to act as he sees fit if he thinks that Josh, or any other commander, has issued a wrong order.

But the psychiatrists are not suspicious of Bob at all, but rather of Josh. Specifically, their protocols inform them that having one man, even the mission commander, dominate the crew is a recipe for disaster. Bob's interview, added to an earlier interview given by Kennedy, only add to their disquiet. During their deliberations, they then run a computer-based decision-analytic model on two possible crew complements—one including Josh, and the other removing Josh as mission commander and assigning Valkerie Jansen to the flight. To everyone's surprise, a crew complement that includes Valkerie scores very high on their decision-analytic indices.

Thus the psychiatrists issue their final "recommendation," which carries the force of an order: Josh Bennett is to be dropped from the crew, Kennedy Hampton is to be promoted to mission commander, and the crew will gain a new mission specialist: Valkerie Jansen.

Valkerie feels doubly guilty about accepting the assignment. First, she sees herself as usurping the place of another, more experienced astronaut (Josh). Second, she is afraid that a prior association will return to haunt her—specifically, her relationship with a fellow student at Yale University who killed himself in a laboratory explosion he had caused because of his notion of Christian duty. (This bombing incident took place during the heyday of Operation Rescue—and furthermore, the presence of a religious-motivated picket line at NASA's main gate only adds to her apprehensions about having her Christian associations revealed.)

Josh is ignorant of her fears concerning her Christian associations, but recognizes that she might feel guilty over supplanting him. So he takes her on a training flight to the Kennedy Space Center and there tells her that her primary duty is to Project Ares, which will shut down completely if she does not accept the assignment. He gallantly offers to take personal responsibility for her remaining training. With this assurance, she returns to Houston and tells Nate Harrington that she will accept the assignment.

=== Launch--and Disaster ===
In January 2014, Ares 10 launches into space. The launch is very violent, because the mission controllers decide to launch in the face of a crosswind that exceeds NASA's stated limits. This causes damage to multiple habitat systems, including the telemetry bus, the Ku-band antenna, and a solar panel. Valkerie develops serious doubts about continuing the mission, especially when she catches Kennedy in a lie about a chemical fluid spill (he says that he spilled juice from a snack container, but Valkerie knows better) and then appears to threaten her with the non-regulation acetylene blowtorch he has brought aboard. Bob is actually no more eager to continue than Valkerie. But Kennedy insists on continuing the mission and browbeats his crew into telling Houston that they are all agreed. Subsequently, they perform trans-Martian injection, thus committing themselves.

Three months later, they have repaired their data telemetry bus, and Kennedy and Bob perform an EVA to repair the Ku-band antenna, a repair that would have been pointless before. After completing the repair, they proceed to inspect the dual solar panels to see whether they can repair the damaged panel. Bob discovers some stray exposed wires that do not appear on anyone's schematics of the habitat. He proceeds to test them with a multimeter—and by a fateful error, sets the multimeter to measure resistance rather than electromotive potential ("voltage"). As a result, he inadvertently bridges a circuit between the wires—and thus causes an explosion. Someone has, quite simply, planted a bomb on board, and Bob has triggered it.

The explosion blows away the otherwise intact solar panel, compromises the hull, and dazes Bob and fills his arm with what turns out to be stainless-steel shrapnel—a detail whose full significance the astronauts will realize only much later. Valkerie, standing by in the EVA suit room, immediately suits up, places the unconscious Lex Ohta into a rescue bubble, hastily repairs the hull breach, and releases the remaining oxygen from the fuel-cell tanks. Only then can she open the airlock to admit Kennedy, who at first insists that Bob is dead. Valkerie, believing that Kennedy acted carelessly, goes outside to fetch him in.

Presently Bob recovers enough to discover that Valkerie's repair was incomplete, and simply asks her to help him make a more complete repair. But as a result of the original hull breach and Valkerie's incomplete repair efforts, the crew no longer has enough oxygen on board to survive the transit to Mars. Neither will they have sufficient power for all ship's systems from the remaining solar panel when they reach Mars. When NASA—represented by a very shaken Josh Bennett as CapCom—fails to inform them of this fact in a timely fashion, the astronauts bleakly conclude that they can no longer trust NASA.

=== A life-or-death choice ===
Josh Bennett refuses to give up on the crew. He remembers that an Earth Return Vehicle is on its way to Mars at the same time, and proposes to accelerate it to intercept Ares 10, so that the crew can use it as a lifeboat. Engineer Cathe Willison computes a solution for the intercept—but then points out that the oxygen will only last if two of the crew sacrifice themselves. Valkerie, however, proposes another solution: observing that Lex, who is still in a coma, is consuming less oxygen, she proposes that two other astronauts go into drug-induced comas, with one astronaut remaining awake to accomplish the rendezvous and then reawaken the rest of the crew. NASA's doctors conclude that Valkerie could in fact synthesize enough sodium pentathol to accomplish this plan. But this raises the question of which astronaut will remain awake.

That question is more than academic—because a review of surveillance tapes made inside the habitat prior to launch identifies six people only who could have planted the bomb—the four members of the crew, Josh Bennett, and Nate Harrington. No one suspects Nate or Josh (not yet), and so the astronauts suspect one another—and furthermore, Kennedy is deliberately manipulating his crewmates' emotions, even to the point of crudely demanding sexual favors from Valkerie (which she refuses to grant).

Two further items of evidence eventually decide the issue in Valkerie's favor. One, Josh Bennett discovers that Kennedy in fact manipulated NASA's psychiatric brass in order to have Josh removed from the crew. Two, a computer simulation predicts that if Bob is the one to stay awake, he'll use up all the oxygen.

Bob, ever reserving his right to act at discretion, secretly prepares a dose of sodium pentathol to use on Valkerie after she has sedated Kennedy. But at the last minute, Valkerie tells him that she forgives him for not trusting her. He cannot bring himself to rebel against Valkerie, and so allows her to sedate him.

=== Another disaster--and eventual landing ===
Valkerie now faces a problem with which she almost cannot cope: total isolation, with no one to converse with—not even Houston, because she must power down the radio to conserve energy. She spends most of the time in prayer, but mostly crying out to God to "send her an e-mail" and give her a reason to believe.

As the ERV continues its approach, Valkerie asks for and receives permission to revive Bob so that he can help her pilot the habitat to a rendezvous with the ERV. Unhappily, the ERV is approaching far too fast. Valkerie's attempt to match velocity with it ends in failure, and worse—she uses up more fuel than they can spare.

With the ERV speeding past the habitat, Bob and Valkerie suddenly remember that the ERV carries a crew re-entry vehicle with its own engine. They issue orders to detach it from the ERV and bring it to a slow rendezvous—and then Valkerie makes another spacewalk to cut loose its oxygen tank and bring it aboard. Bob, in turn, receives instructions to build a Sabatier scrubber—an ultra-low-power device for removing carbon dioxide from the ship's air.

They then reawaken Kennedy, who must regain his strength to perform the landing—and then decide that the only way they can land is to abandon the original mission profile calling for a Martian orbital capture, and instead dive straight down to the Martian surface. This is an incredibly risky maneuver, one which they almost do not complete because they are about to use an aerobrake deployment system that is non-functional. (Another failure of trust is responsible for this predicament, which they avoid only by some last-minute deduction of NASA's true intentions.) They intend to land in a camp that previous missions have already established—but they end up landing too far away. However, they manage to pool their remaining oxygen to give to Bob and Kennedy, so that they can retrieve a pressurized powered rover to rescue Valkerie and Lex. When the men return, they find the women unconscious and seemingly dead—but Valkerie has found Bob's hidden dose of sodium pentathol and uses that to put her and Lex into a coma once again—so that they survive, but Valkerie suffers multiple rib fractures when Bob attempts cardiopulmonary resuscitation.

Finally, the astronauts realize the significance of the stainless-steel shrapnel with which Bob had been wounded in the initial explosion. None of the ship's systems was made of stainless steel—in fact, the lack of any material but plastic was a source of great frustration to Valkerie when she first attempted to seal the hull breach. Valkerie and Lex realize that the stainless steel must have come from a bacterial culture vial that Josh Bennett had received from a former girlfriend in Antarctica—and that the vial contained a radiation-resistant bacterium, the same one that in fact had contaminated some of the ship's systems after the explosion. Now the astronauts realize what has happened to them: Josh Bennett, fearing cancellation of Project Ares and the disbanding of NASA, sought to "seed" a radio-resistant bacterium on Mars for the astronauts to "discover." To accomplish this, he did plant a bomb on board, designed to detonate with the deployment of the aerobrakes. But the damage to the habitat on the rocky launch ultimately caused the bomb to detonate in transit. This also explains Josh's brittle emotional state—he realizes that his attempt to give the astronauts something to discover very nearly killed them instead. Bob ultimately tells Josh that Valkerie has figured it out, and that they all forgive him for what he did, knowing as they do that he never meant them any harm.

The last scene is a set-up for the sequel (The Fifth Man): Bob, who is now enamored of Valkerie, proposes marriage to her before a worldwide six-billion-strong television audience that has tuned into watch "the first two astronauts to walk on Mars."

== Characters ==
- Astronaut Joshua "Josh" Bennett, original Mission Commander, afterwards CapCom.
- Astronaut Kennedy "The Hampster" Hampton, original Pilot Officer, afterwards Mission Commander.
- Astronaut Alexis "Lex" Ohta, original Mission Specialist (Geology), afterwards Pilot Officer.
- Astronaut Bob "Kaggo" Kaganovski, Mission Specialist (Engineering)
- Astronaut Candidate Valerie "Valkerie" Jansen, eventual Mission Specialist (Life Sciences and Crew Medicine)
- Nathan "Nate" Harrington, Mars Mission Director
- Steven Perez, Chief Administrator, NASA
- Robert Abrams, MD, senior psychiatrist, NASA
- Special Agent Crystal Yamaguchi, FBI
- Cathe Willison, engineer

== Major themes ==
Space exploration, the importance of friendship, the power of prayer and faith, the Providential nature of God, and how sometimes humans fail to hear the voice of God because "He won't send an e-mail."

== Allusions/references to other works ==
The book contains scattered allusions to Star Trek, and more specifically to which characters in that 1960s television series are most analogous to various positions on a Mars crew.

The narrative also contains an allusion to The Right Stuff, by describing Astronaut Kennedy Hampton as being an astronaut in the "fighter jock" mold—addicted to flying as a physical sport, given to moderately heavy social drinking, sometimes given to driving while intoxicated, and accepting questionable attentions from female hangers-on, also known as groupies. (Note: this novel is devoid of any sexual content beyond Astronaut Hampton crudely soliciting a sexual bribe from Astronaut Jansen, who indignantly refuses.)

== Allusions/references to actual history, current science, and popular culture ==
Oxygen makes repeated and obvious references to the near-disastrous Apollo 13 mission.

The Mars Habitat Unit, the Earth Return Vehicle, the Ares Heavy Lift Launch Vehicle, and various other pieces of equipment are all products of the active research program of Mars Society under the directorship of Doctor Robert Zubrin. The mission profile is an adaptation of NASA's own Mars Design Reference Mission profile, which itself derives from the Mars Society's own Mars Semi-Direct Mission profile.

The following real-life institutions and events bear direct reference in Oxygen: the United States Senate, NBC, and the National Football League (and its premier event, the Super Bowl). Specifically:

- A US Senator threatens to terminate Project Ares and even NASA itself.
- NASA commits with NBC to launch Ares 10 the day before the Super Bowl, on a transit timed to have it land on Mars on Independence Day. This is not an optimal launch profile, and as such it is a source of tremendous frustration and consternation on the part of everyone involved, not least the crew.

== Literary significance and criticism ==
Oxygen is one of few novels to propose that astronauts might not be the unblemished heroes of the popular legend that has grown about them. This legend dates back to Projects Apollo, Gemini, and especially Mercury. Though the author Tom Wolfe (The Right Stuff) has definitively revealed that the Mercury astronauts were not unblemished heroes (with the possible exception of John Glenn), the notion of an astronaut deliberately manipulating his administrative superiors to influence a flight assignment, and another astronaut resorting to planting a "discoverable scientific find" in order to ensure continuance of his country's space program, might have proved difficult for readers to accept.

The jarring portrait of NASA's finest might serve as one possible explanation for the lack of continued interest in this title. However, Christian critics have consistently praised the work, perhaps because it unabashedly demonstrates that no human beings deserve placement on any sort of pedestal, and that all human beings are quite capable of making mistakes, often disastrous ones, even with the best of intentions.

By far, however, the greatest significance of works like this is that they seek to bridge the gap between faith on one side, and pure and applied science on the other. Oxygen forthrightly addresses certain areas of science that might appear to test the Christian faith quite sorely—among them the very possibility of finding living organisms on a world other than earth. Regrettably, Oxygen does not offer any explanation that might reconcile the disparate concepts of life on worlds beyond earth, and God having created life on earth and only on earth. One possible explanation might be that Mars harbors living organisms carried to it in the event that caused the Noachic Flood. (See especially the article on Hydroplates.) But neither this novel nor its sequel discuss that possibility at all—possibly because the theory remains controversial. Instead, they offer an assurance that the Christian faith is strong enough to stand any test, including a scientific finding that might on the surface appear to contradict Scripture. (In fact, Scripture is silent on the nature of the planets, and indeed on all celestial bodies, except the sun, moon, and stars.)

=== Awards and nominations ===
Oxygen won the 2002 Christy Award for the best futuristic Christian novel in its year of release.
