= The Fifth Man (novel) =

2002 novel by John B. Olson and Randall S. Ingermanson

- Author: John B. Olsen and Randall S. Ingermanson
- Cover artist: Lookout Design Group, Inc. (actual person uncredited)
- Language: English
- Genre: Science fiction
- Publisher: Bethany House
- Publication date: 2002
- Publication place: United States
- Media type: Print (paperback)
- Pages: 361 (paperback edition)
- ISBN: 0-7642-2732-7 (paperback edition)
- OCLC: 50079856
- Dewey Decimal: 813/.6 21
- LC Class: PS3615.L75 F54 2002

The Fifth Man is a 2002 futuristic Christian novel by John B. Olson and Randall S. Ingermanson.

== Plot summary ==
Eight months into their stay on Mars, the life-sciences specialist of the first crew to land on Mars discovers a microbial fossil. Subsequent to this, the crew begin to suffer various mishaps, including damage to mission property and direct attacks upon themselves. Complicating the situation is the apparent psychiatric breakdown of the mission commander and his definite attempts to injure or kill his fellow crewmembers.

On Earth, the Mars Mission Director, working with an agent of the FBI, races to discover who sabotaged the mission before the crew even arrived on Mars—and who might be trying to strand the crew on Mars now that they're on it. He is shocked to discover that his own Flight Director committed the initial sabotage—he was trying to seed Mars with a bacterium that would be taken as evidence of life on Mars, thus ensuring continued funding of Project Ares, the official name for the program.

But when the life-sciences specialist falls ill from an actual microbial infection—from live bacteria which she has subsequently discovered—the mishaps multiply, with a corresponding increase in the physical danger to the crew. Someone other than the Flight Director is responsible for this. At the very end, that someone is revealed to be a NASA engineer who fears that the crew, now on their way back to Earth, are bringing back a germ that could potentially kill millions of people—this although the crew clearly showed that the germ was sensitive to the antibiotics they had carried with them. The mission ends with the psychiatrically challenged commander sacrificing his own life to save the rest of the crew—and the marriage of the two mission specialists aboard their Earth Return Vehicle.

== Characters ==
- Astronaut Kennedy "The Hampster" Hampton, Mission Commander
- Astronaut Alexis "Lex" Ohta, Pilot Officer
- Astronaut Bob "Kaggo" Kaganovski, Mission Specialist, Engineering Systems
- Astronaut Valerie "Valkerie" Jansen, Mission Specialist, Life Sciences and Crew Medicine
- Astronaut Joshua "Josh" Bennett, Flight Director
- Nathan "Nate" Harrington, Mars Mission Director
- Steven Perez, NASA Administrator
- Special Agent Crystal Yamaguchi, FBI
- Cathe Willison, engineer
- Dre Fazio, Founder, Federal Hill Posse

== Major themes ==
Space exploration, life on Mars, the nobility of self-sacrifice, and the folly of trying to out-guess God.

== Allusions/references to other works ==
The Fifth Man is a sequel to Oxygen, an earlier novel in which the same crew suffers damage due to explosion that almost causes them to die of suffocation.

== Allusions/references to actual history and current science ==
This novel, and its prequel, uses concepts adapted from the Mars Semi-Direct mission profile proposed, and under active research, by the Mars Society. As such, these novels are two of the most realistic novels yet written that describe what the first crewed mission to Mars, and the program of which it is a part, might look like and how it might actually work.

== Literary significance and criticism ==
The Fifth Man continues the trend in Christian fiction away from the preachy, tract-like novels of the 1990s and toward novels with "crossover appeal"—that is, novels that a non-Christian might appreciate nearly as well as does a Christian. Christian science fiction is very rare, primarily because of the inherent restrictions that apply to a Christian novel—in this case, that such a novel may not create a character or a situation for which the Bible holds no warrant. Thus, while the title of this work strongly suggests an extraterrestrial visitor as an agent that assaults the astronauts (and ultimately murders one of them), some Christians find it impossible to accept such a concept. Thus the agent of the mayhem that plagues and pursues the astronauts must be a human agent. The realization of this fact has led some readers to criticize The Fifth Man severely, accusing the authors of the literary equivalent of bait-and-switch.

Yet a close read of this novel and its prequel Oxygen clearly shows that the same character responsible for killing Astronaut Hampton and almost killing the rest of the crew, was also responsible for the failed "lifeboat" mission in the earlier novel. More to the point, however, a Fifth Man does exist on Mars. The surviving astronauts see him very briefly before they make their hurried take-off. They do not recognize him, but anyone who has read the third chapter of the Biblical book of Daniel probably will. Thus the Fifth Man is extraterrestrial, after all—but not in the usual sense in modern popular culture.

=== Awards and nominations ===
The Fifth Man was a finalist for the Christy Award for the best futuristic Christian novel published in 2002. It lost to Time Lottery. Another finalist in that same year was the novel Ice.
