= Mars habitat =

Facility where humans could live on Mars

NASA artwork of a potential Mars habitat in conjunction with other surface elements on Mars (2019)

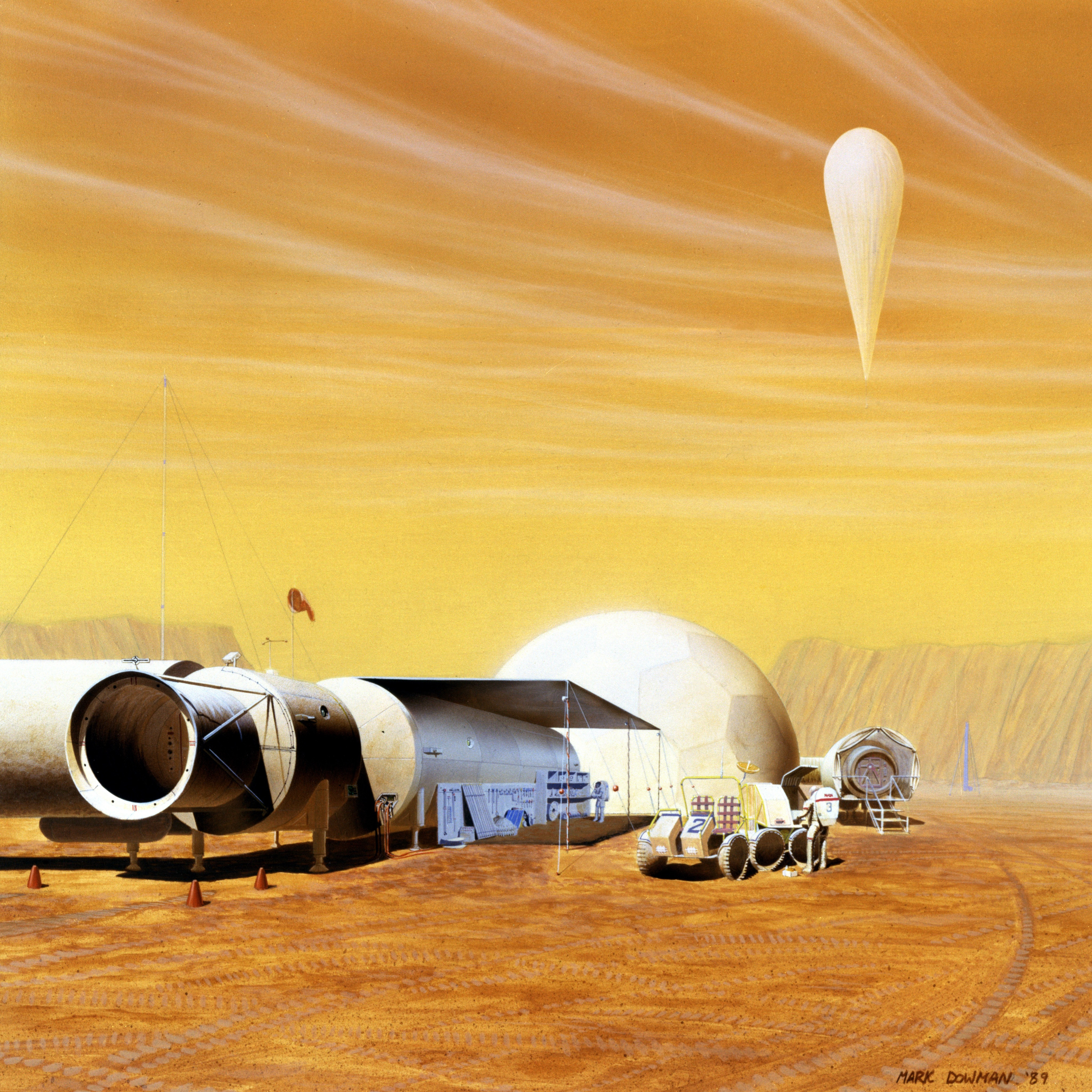
Various components of the Mars Outpost proposal. (M. Dowman, 1989)

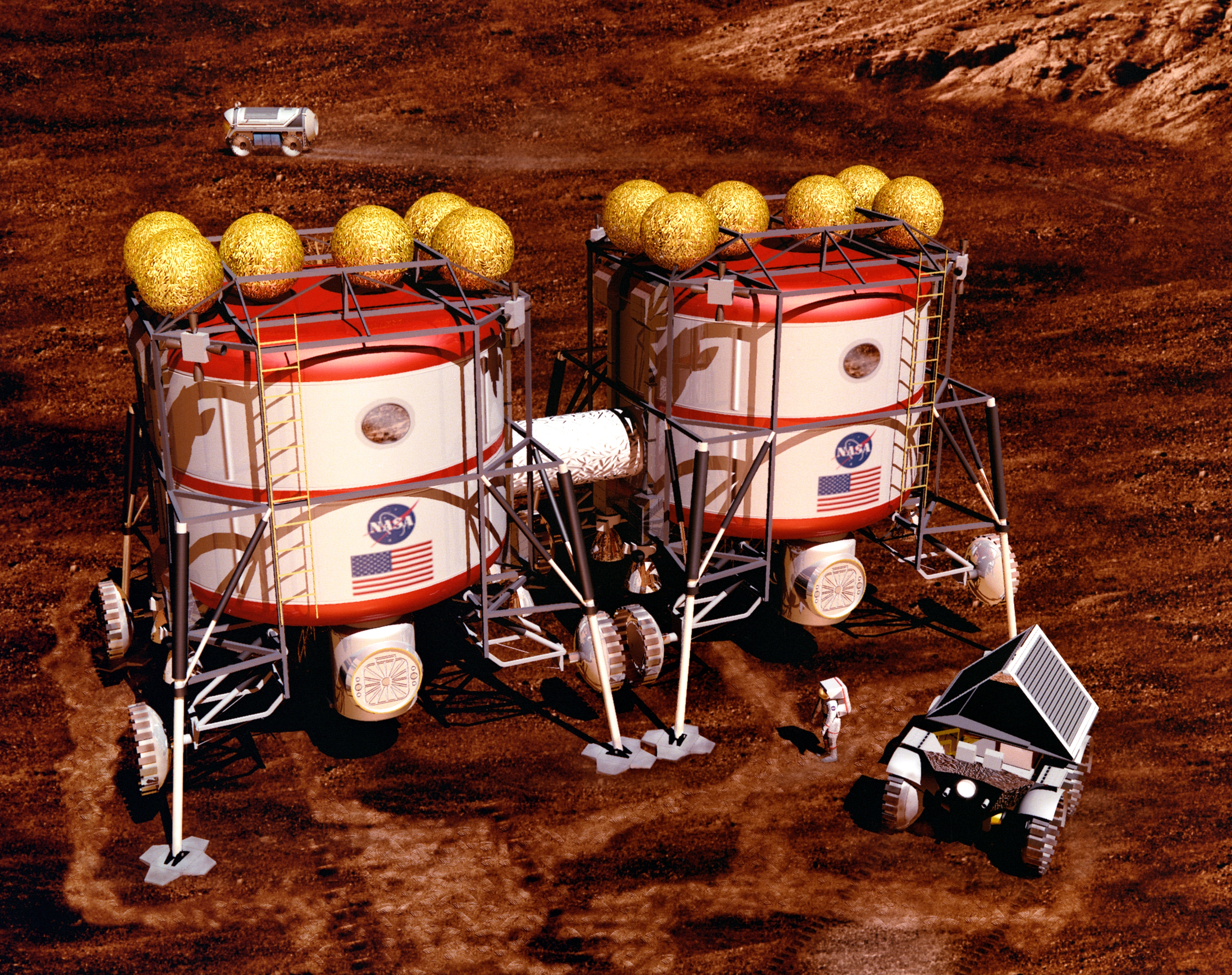
1990s era NASA design featuring 'spam can' type habitat landers. The downside may be minimal shielding for the crew, and two ideas are to use Mars materials, such as ice, to increase shielding, and another is to move underground, perhaps caves

A Mars habitat is a hypothetical place where humans could live on Mars. Mars habitats would have to contend with surface conditions that include almost no oxygen in the air, extreme cold, low pressure, and high radiation. Such a habitat might be placed underground, which would help to solve some problems but create new difficulties.

One challenge is the extreme cost of transporting building materials to the Martian surface, which by the 2010s was estimated to be about US$2 million per brick. While the gravity on Mars is lower than that on Earth, there are stronger solar radiation and temperature cycles, and high internal forces needed for pressurized habitats to contain air.

To contend with these constraints, architects have worked to understand the right balance between in-situ materials and construction, and ex-situ to Mars. For example, one idea is to use the locally available regolith to shield against radiation exposure, and another idea is to use transparent ice to allow non-harmful light to enter the habitat. Mars habitat design can also involve the study of local conditions, including pressures, temperatures, and local materials, especially water.

== Overview ==
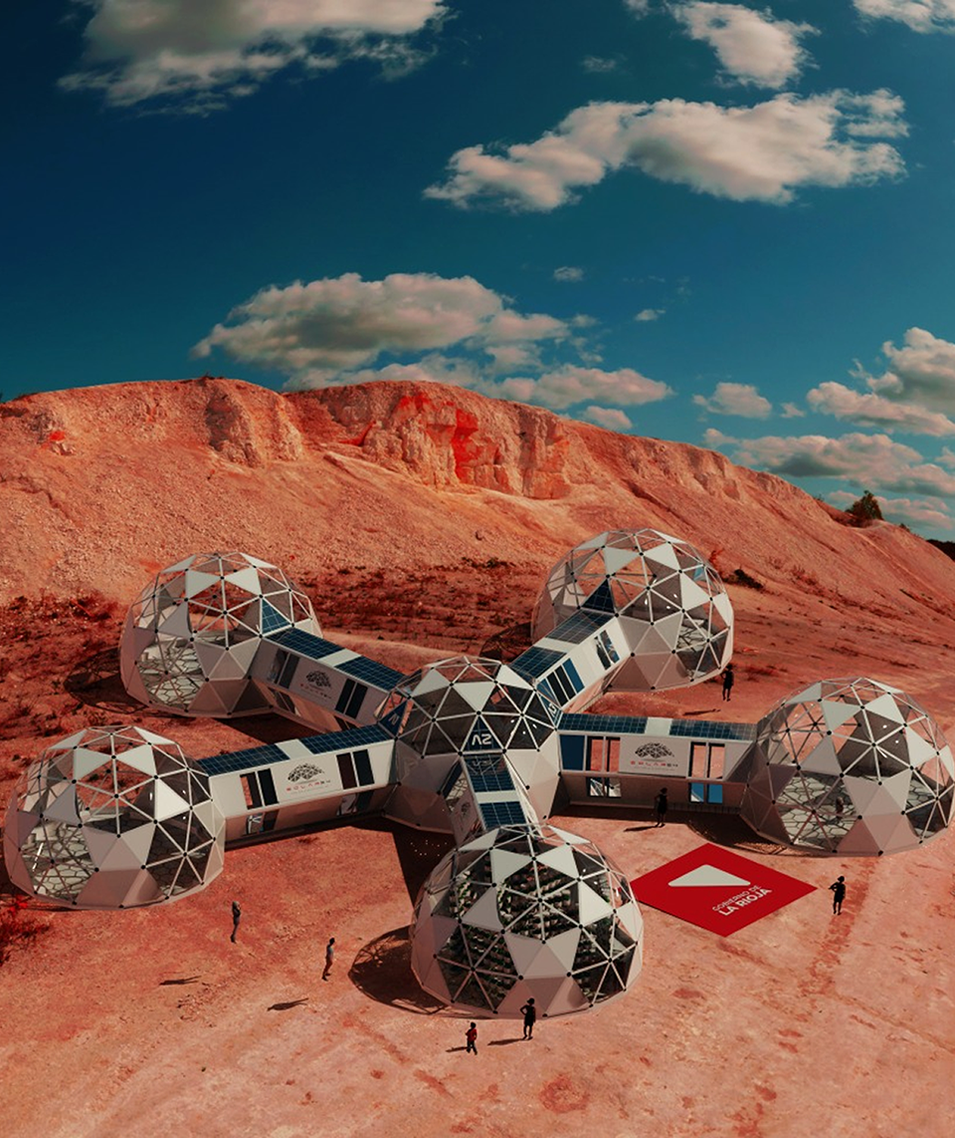
Solar54 – Argentina

Significant challenges for Mars habitats are maintaining an artificial environment and shielding from intense solar radiation. Humans require a pressurized environment at all times and protection from the toxic Martian atmosphere. Connecting habitats is useful, as moving between separate structures requires a pressure suit or perhaps a pressurized Mars rover. One of the largest issues lies in simply getting to Mars, which means escaping Earth's atmosphere, sustaining the journey to Mars, and finally landing on the surface of Mars. One helpful aspect is the Mars atmosphere, which allows for aerobraking, meaning less need for using propellant to slow a craft for safe landing. However, the amount of energy required to transfer material to the surface of Mars is an additional task beyond simply getting into orbit.

During the late 1960s, the United States produced the Saturn V rocket, which was capable of launching enough mass into orbit required for a single-launch trip holding a crew of three to the surface of the Moon and back again. This feat required a number of specially designed pieces of hardware and the development of a technique known as the Lunar Orbit Rendezvous. The Lunar Orbit Rendezvous was a plan to coordinate the descent and ascent vehicles for a rendezvous in Lunar orbit. Referring to Mars, a similar technique would require a Mars Excursion Module, which combines a crewed descent-ascent vehicle and short stay surface habitat. Later plans have separated the descent-ascent vehicle and surface habitat, which further developed into separate descent, surface stay, and ascent vehicles using a new design architecture. In 2010, the Space Launch System, or future variants thereof, is envisioned as having the payload capacity and qualities needed for human Mars missions, using the Orion capsule.

One of the challenges for Mars habitats is maintaining the climate, especially the right temperature in the right places. Electronic devices and lights generate heat that rises in the air, even as there are extreme temperature fluctuations outside.

One idea for a Mars habitat is to use a Martian cave or lava tube, and an inflatable air-lock was proposed by the Caves of Mars Project for making use of such a structure. The idea of living in lava tubes has been suggested for their potential to provide increased protection from radiation, temperature fluctuation, Martian sunlight, etc. An advantage of living underground is that it avoids the need to create a radiation shield above ground. Another idea is to use robots to construct the base in advance of human's arrival.

The use of living plants or other living biologicals to aid in the air and food supply if desired can have major impact on the design. Using a reduced-pressure greenhouse could reduce the structural demands of maintaining air pressure, but require the relevant plants to survive at that lower pressure. It is questioned how low of pressure a plant could survive in and still be useful.

A Mars habitat may need to focus on keeping a certain type of plant alive, for example, as part of supporting its inhabitants. NASA's Caves of Mars study suggested the following food and food production characteristics:

- Rapid growth
- survival in low light
- wide pH range
- high nutrition
- minimal waste

The study noted two plants, duckweed (Lemna minor) and water fern (Azolla filiculoides), as particularly suitable, and they grow on the surface of water. The Mars habitat would have to support the conditions of these food sources, possibly incorporating elements from greenhouse design or farming.

Historically, space missions tend to have a set amount of rations like Skylab, replenished with resupply from Earth. Using plants to affect the atmosphere and even enhance food supply was experimented with in the 2010s aboard the International Space Station.

Another issue is waste management. On Skylab all waste was put in a tank; on Apollo and the Space Shuttle, urine could be vented into space or pushed away in bags to re-enter Earth's atmosphere.

Considerations for maintaining the environment in a closed system included, removal of carbon dioxide, maintaining air pressure, supply of oxygen, temperature and humidity, and stopping fires. Another issue with a closed system is keeping it free from contamination from emissions from different materials, dust, or smoke. One concern on Mars is the effect of the fine dust of the Martian soil working its way into the living quarters or devices. The dust is very fine and accumulates on solar panels, amongst other surfaces.

=== Relevant technologies ===
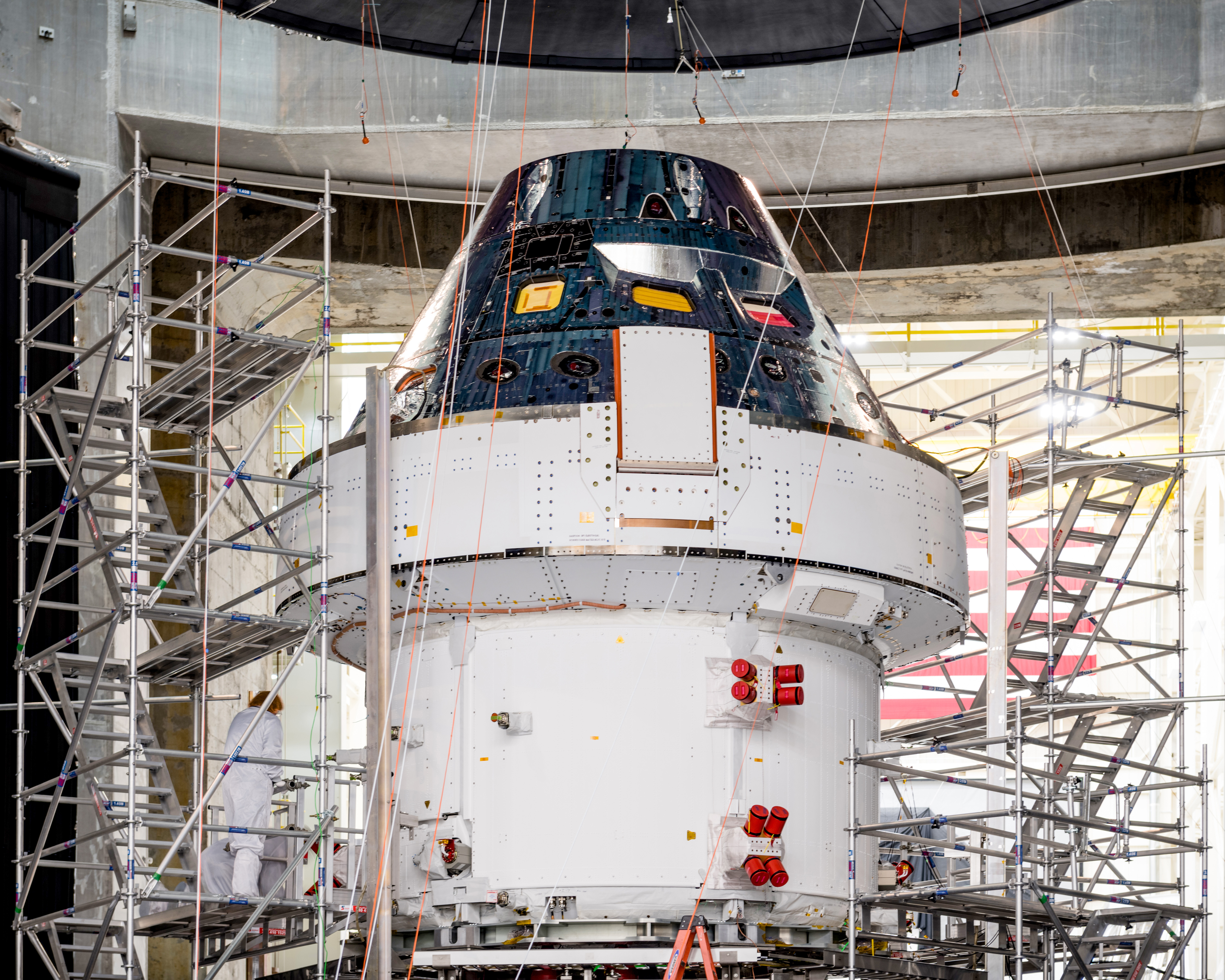
Orion spacecraft

Some possible areas of needed technology or expertise are:

- 3D Printing
- Mars atmospheric entry
- Caves of Mars Project
- Mars Excursion Module
- Aerospace engineering
- Space capsule
- Plants in space

=== Context ===
A Mars habitat is often conceived as part of an ensemble of Mars base and infrastructure technologies. Some examples include Mars extra vehicular activity (EVA) suits, Mars rovers (both pressurized and not pressurized), aircraft, landers, storage tanks, communication structures, mining, and Mars-movers (e.g. Earth-moving equipment).

A Mars habitat might exist in the context of a human expedition, outpost, or colony on Mars.

=== Air ===
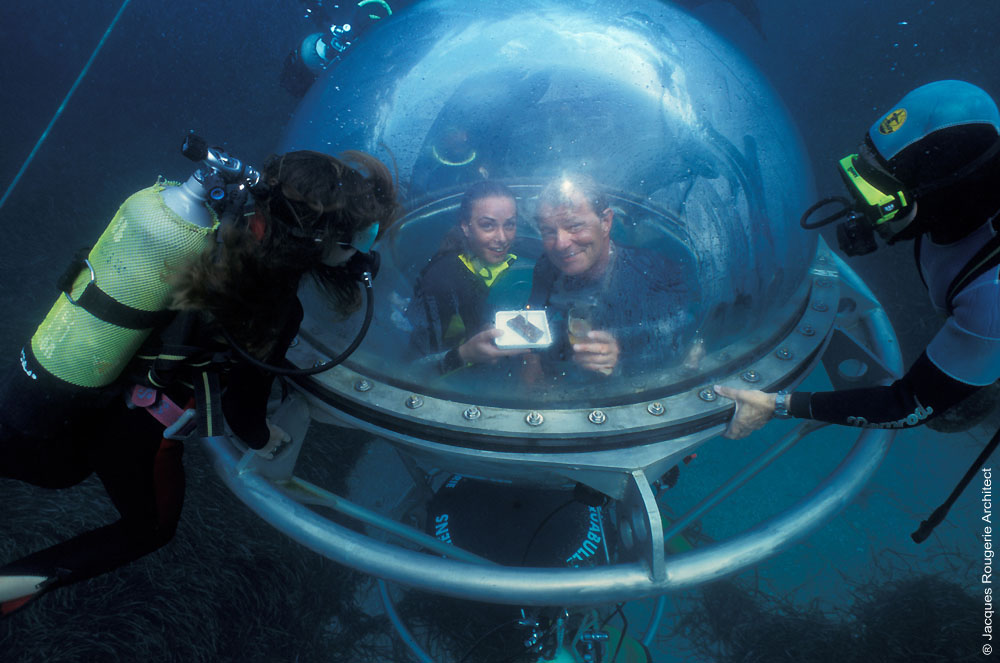
People inside a clear diving bell on Earth

In creating a habitat for people, some considerations are maintaining the right air temperature, the right air pressure, and the composition of that atmosphere.

While it is possible for humans to breathe pure oxygen, a pure oxygen atmosphere was implicated in the Apollo 1 fire. As such, Mars habitats may have a need for additional gases. One possibility is to take nitrogen and argon from the atmosphere of Mars. As a result, a Mars habitat may use 40% argon, 40% nitrogen, and 20% oxygen. See also Argox, for the argon breathing gas mixture used in scuba diving

A concept to scrub CO_{2} from the breathing air is to use re-usable amine bead carbon dioxide scrubbers. While one carbon dioxide scrubber filters the astronaut's air, the other can vent scrubbed CO_{2} to the Mars atmosphere.

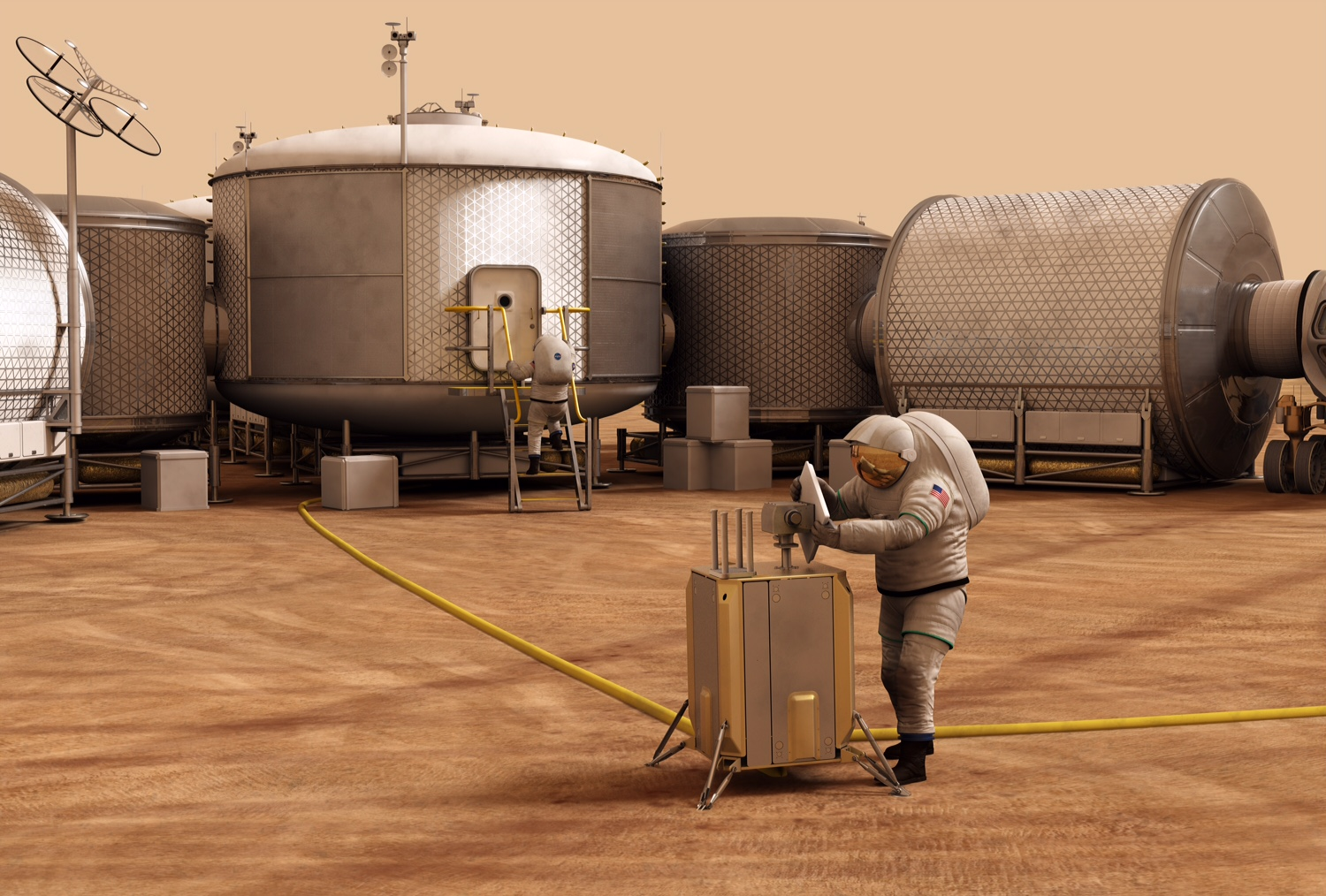
Conceptual Mars habitats with astronauts

One unique structural force that Mars habitats must contend with if pressurized to Earth's atmosphere, is the force of air on the inside walls. This has been estimated at over 2,000 pounds per square foot (9,800 kg/m^{2}) for a pressurized habitat on the surface of Mars, which is radically increased compared to Earth structures. A closer comparison can be made to crewed high-altitude aircraft, which must withstand forces of 1,100 to 1,400 pounds per square foot (5,400 to 6,800 kg/m^{2}) when at altitude.

At about 150 thousand feet of altitude (28 miles (45 km)) on Earth, the atmospheric pressure starts to be equivalent to the surface of Mars.

Atmospheric pressure comparison
Location	Pressure
Olympus Mons summit	0.03 kPa (0.0044 psi)
Mars average	0.6 kPa (0.087 psi)
Hellas Planitia bottom	1.16 kPa (0.168 psi)
Armstrong limit	6.25 kPa (0.906 psi)
Mount Everest summit	33.7 kPa (4.89 psi)
Earth sea level	101.3 kPa (14.69 psi)
Surface of Venus	9,200 kPa (1,330 psi)

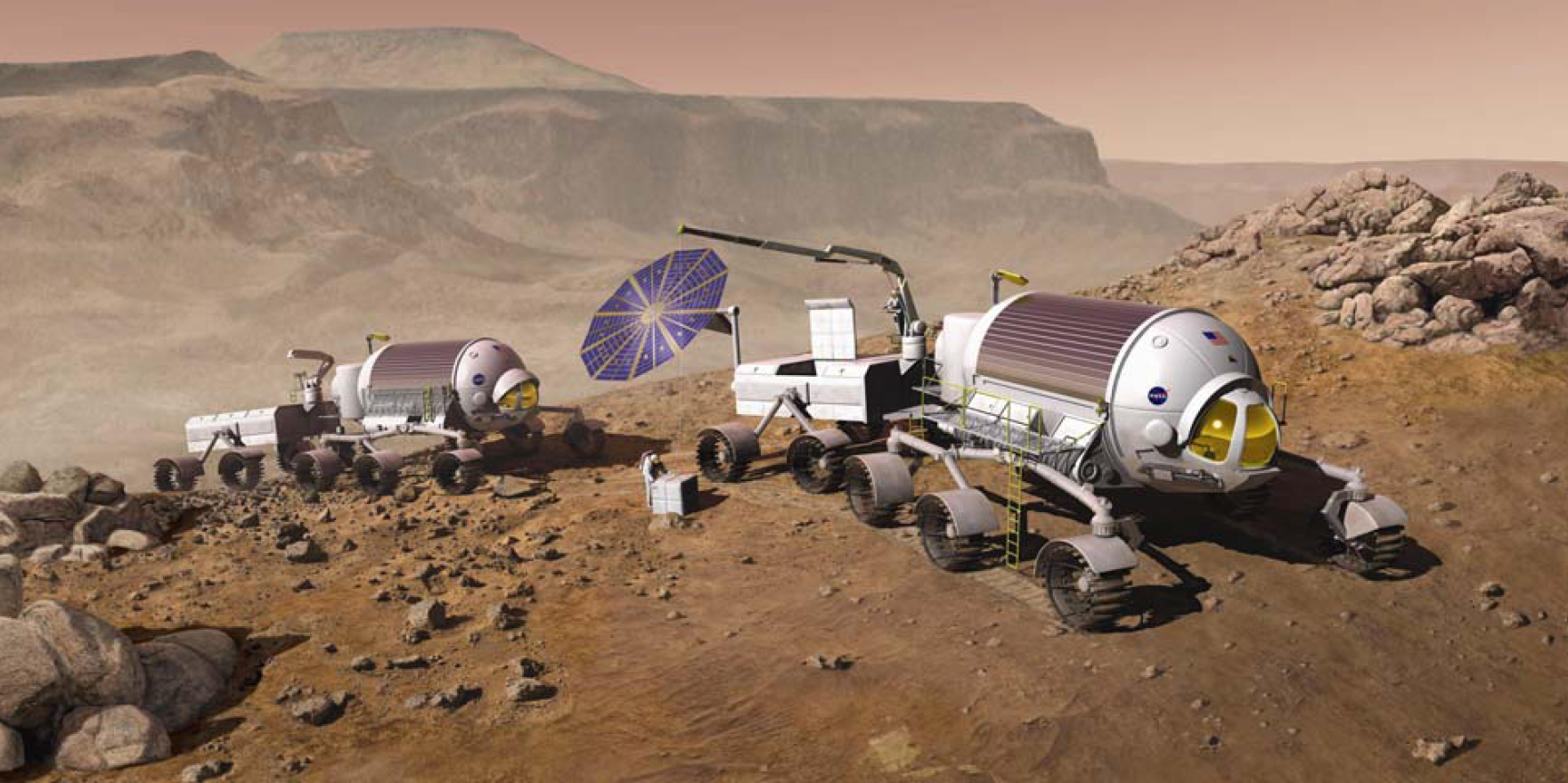
A 2007 NASA design for mobile habitat on the move, such as for a circumnavigation of the planet

=== Temperature ===
One of the challenges for a Mars habitat is for it to maintain suitable temperatures in the right places in a habitat. Things like electronics and lights generate heat that rises in the air, even as there are extreme temperature fluctuations outside. There can be large temperature swings on Mars, for example at the equator it may reach 70°F (20°C) in the daytime but then go to minus 100°F (−73°C) at night.

Examples of Mars surface temperatures:

- Average −80°F (−60°C).
- Polar locations in winter −195°F (−125°C).
- Equator in summer daytime High 70°F (20°C).

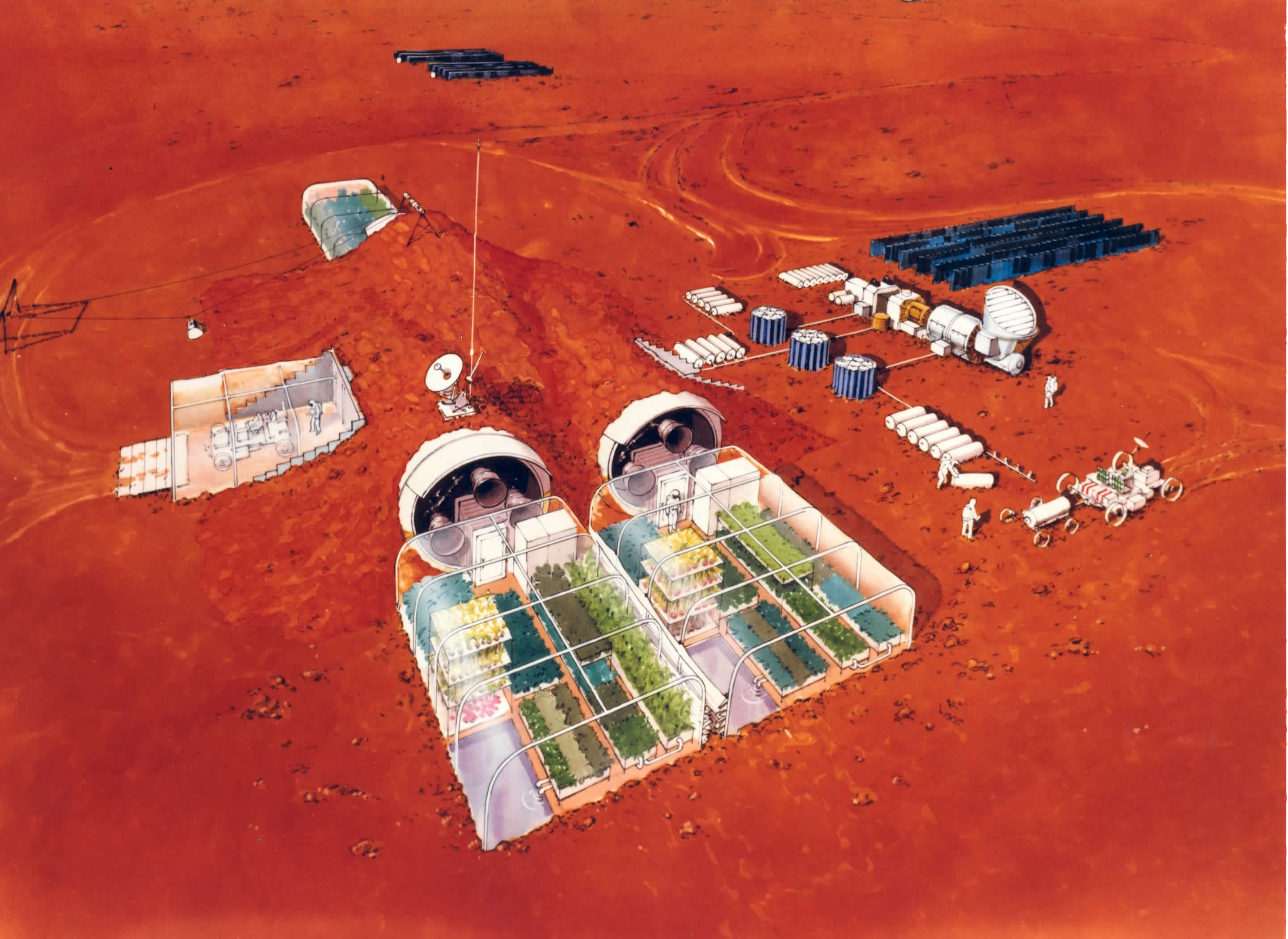
A vision for habitats published by NASA from CASE FOR MARS from the 1980s, featuring the re-use of landing vehicles, in-situ soil use for enhanced radiation shielding, and green houses. A bay for a Mars rover is also visible.

=== Temporary vs permanent habitation ===
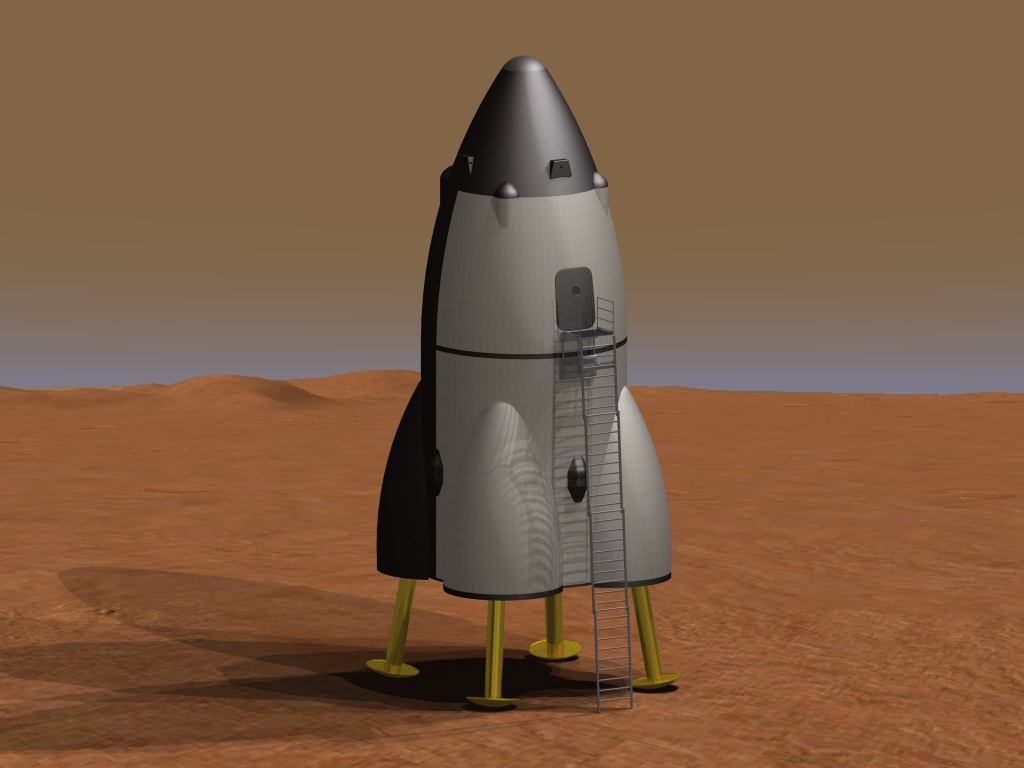
A human landing on Mars would necessitate different levels of support for habitation

A short term stay on the surface of Mars does not require a habitat to have a large volume or complete shielding from radiation. The situation would be similar to the International Space Station, where individuals receive an unusually high amount of radiation for a short duration and then leave. A small and light habitat can be transported to Mars and used immediately.

Long term permanent habitats require much more volume to house things such as a greenhouse and thick shielding to minimize the annual dose of radiation received. This type of habitat is too large and heavy to be sent to Mars, and likely would be constructed making use of some local resources. Possibilities include covering structures with ice or soil, excavating subterranean spaces or sealing the ends of an existing lava tube.

A larger settlement may be able to have a larger medical staff, increasing the ability to deal with health issues and emergencies. Whereas a small expedition of 4–6 people may only be able to have 1 medical doctor, an outpost of 20 might be able to have more than one and nurses, in addition to those with emergency or paramedic training. A full settlement may be able to achieve the same level of care as a contemporary Earth hospital.

=== Medical ===
One problem for medical care on Mars missions, is the difficulty in returning to Earth for advanced care, and providing adequate emergency care with a small crew size. A crew of six might have only one crew member trained to the level of emergency medical technician and one physician, but for a mission that would last years. In addition, consultations with Earth would be hampered by a 7- to 40-minute time lag. Medical risks include exposure to radiation and reduced gravity, and one deadly risk is a Solar Particle Event that can generate a lethal dose of radiation over the course of several hours or days if the astronauts do not have enough shielding. Materials testing has recently been done to explore spacesuits and "storm shelters" for protection from Galactic Cosmic Radiation and Solar Particle Events during launch, transit, and habitation upon Mars. Medical preparedness also requires that the effect of radiation on stored pharmaceuticals and medical technology would have to be taken into account.

One of the medical supplies that may be needed is intravenous fluid, which is mostly water but contains other things so it can be added directly to the blood stream. If it can be created on the spot from existing water then it could spare the weight of hauling earth-produced units, whose weight is mostly water. A prototype for this capability was tested on the International Space Station (ISS) in 2010.

On some of the first crewed missions, three types of medications should be taken into orbit; the antiemetic trimethobenzamide; the painkiller pethidine; and the stimulant dextroamphetamine. By the time of ISS, the crew had almost 200 medications available, with separate pill cabinets for Russians and Americans. One of the many concerns for crewed Mars missions is what medicine to bring and how the astronauts would respond to them in different conditions.

In 1999, NASA's Johnson Space Center published Medical Aspects of Exploration Missions as part of the Decadal Survey. On a small mission, it might be possible to have one person be a medical doctor and another be a paramedic, out of a crew of perhaps 4–6 people, however on a larger mission with 20 people there could also be a nurse and options like minor surgery might be possible. Two major categories of medical attention needs for space would be emergency medical care and then more advanced care, dealing with a wide range concerns due to space-travel. For very small crews, it is difficult to treat a wide range of issues with advanced care, whereas with a team of overall size12–20 on Mars, there could be multiple doctors and nurses, in addition to EMT-level certifications. While not at the level of a typical Earth hospital, this would transition medical care beyond basic options typical of very small crew sizes (2–3) where the accepted risk is higher.

With a modest number of Mars inhabitants and medical crew, robot-assisted surgery could be considered. A crew member could operate the robot with help via telecommunications from Earth. Two examples of medical-care situations that have been mentioned in regard to people on Mars is how to deal with a broken leg and an appendicitis. One concern is to stop what would otherwise be a minor injury from becoming life-threatening due to restrictions on the amount of medical equipment, training, and the time-delay in communication with Earth. The time delay for a one way message ranges from 4 to 24 minutes. A response to a message takes that time, the delay processing the message and creating a reply, plus the time for that message to travel to Mars (another 4 to 24 minutes).

Examples of acute medical emergency scenarios for Mars missions:

- Wounds, lacerations, and burns
- Exposure to a toxin
- Acute allergic reactions (anaphylaxis)
- Acute radiation sickness
- Dental
- Eye (Ophthalmologic)
- Psychiatric

An example of spaceflight related health emergency was the inert gas asphyxiation with nitrogen gas aboard Space Shuttle Columbia in 1981, when it was undergoing preparations for its launch In that case, a routine purge with nitrogen to decrease risk of fire lead to 5 medical emergencies and 2 deaths. Another infamous space related accident is the Apollo 1 incident, when a pure oxygen atmosphere ignited in the interior of space capsule during tests on the ground, three died. A 1997 study of about 280 space travelers between 1988 and 1995, found that only 3 did not have some sort of medical issue on their spaceflight. A medical risk for a Mars surface mission is how the astronauts will handle operations on the surface after several months in zero gravity. On Earth, astronauts are usually carted from the spacecraft and take a long time to recover.

=== Library ===
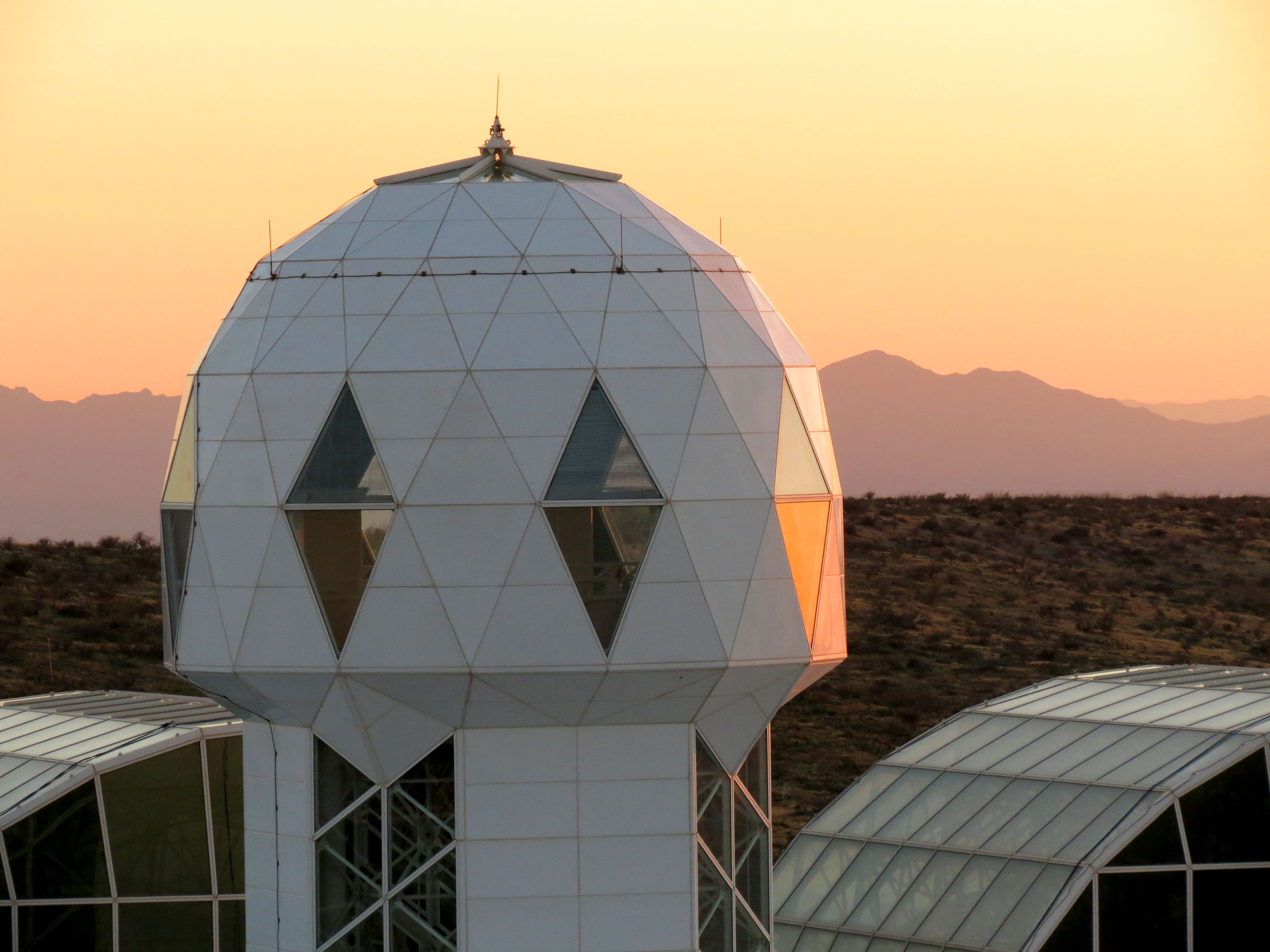
Library Tower of Biosphere 2, an Earth analog space habitat tested in the 1990s

One idea for a Mars missions is a library sent to the surface of that planet. The Phoenix lander, which landed on the North polar surface of Mars in 2008, included a DVD library that was heralded as the first library on Mars. The Phoenix library DVD would be taken by future explorers who could access the content on the disk. The disk, both a memorial to the past and a message to the future, took 15 years to produce. The content on the disk includes Visions of Mars. One idea for exploration is knowledge arks for space, a sort of back-up of knowledge in case something happens to Earth.

The Biosphere 2 closed-loop biosphere test included a library with the living quarters. The library was positioned at the top of a tower, and known as Library tower.

=== Meteor impacts ===
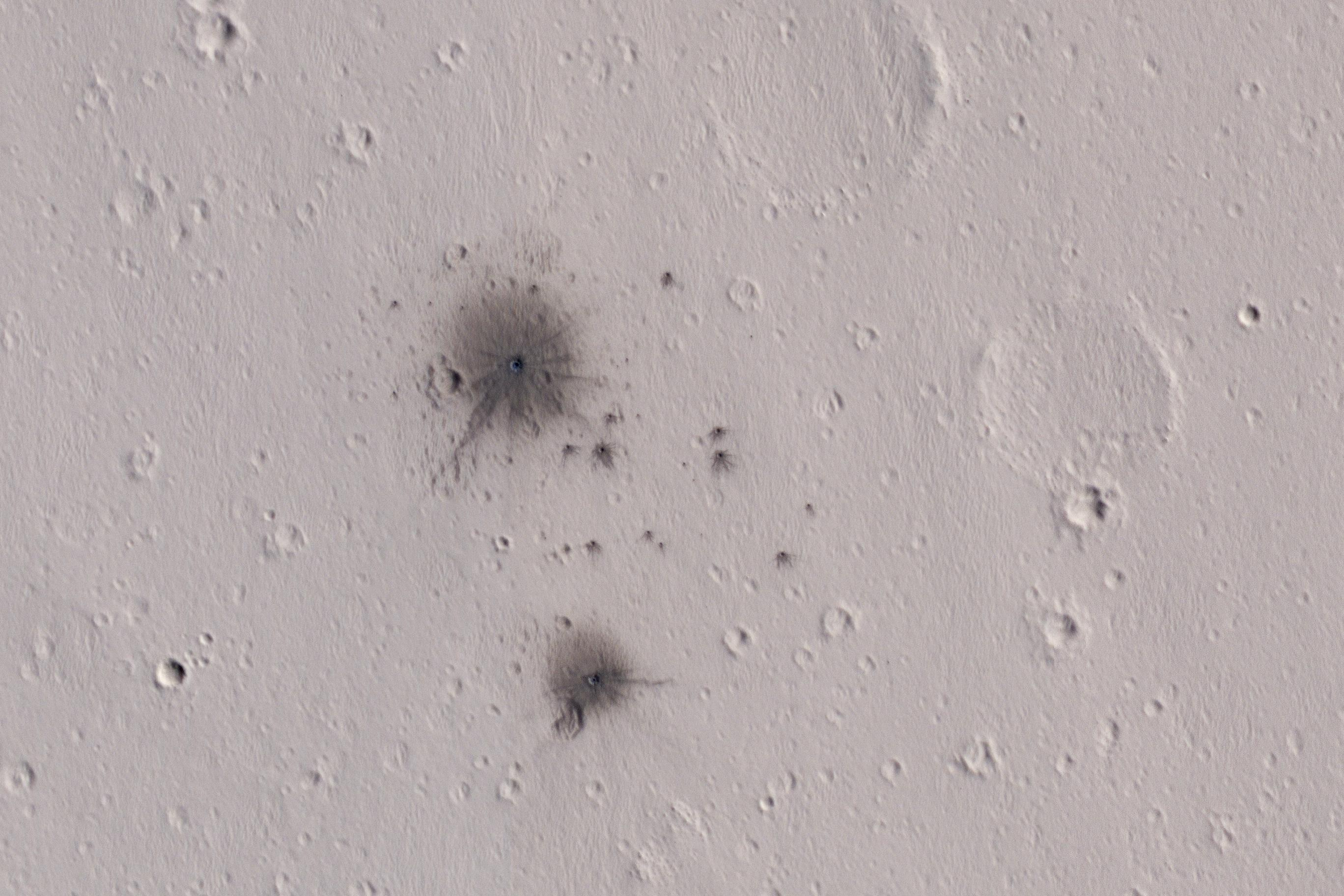
Fresh impact craters detected in the early 2000s by Mars satellites

Another consideration for Mars habitats is the need to potentially deal with a meteor impact. Because the atmosphere is thinner than Earth, more meteors make it to the surface. A meteor might puncture the surface of the habitat and thereby cause a loss of pressure and/or damage systems.

In the 2010s, it was determined that something struck the surface of Mars, creating a spattering pattern of larger and smaller craters between 2008 and 2014. In this case the atmosphere only partially disintegrated the meteor before it struck the surface.

=== Radiation ===
Radiation exposure is a concern for astronauts on the surface, as Mars lacks a strong magnetic field, and atmosphere is too thin to stop as much radiation as Earth. It has been estimated that sixteen feet (5 meters) of Mars regolith stops the same amount of radiation as Earth's atmosphere.

=== Power ===
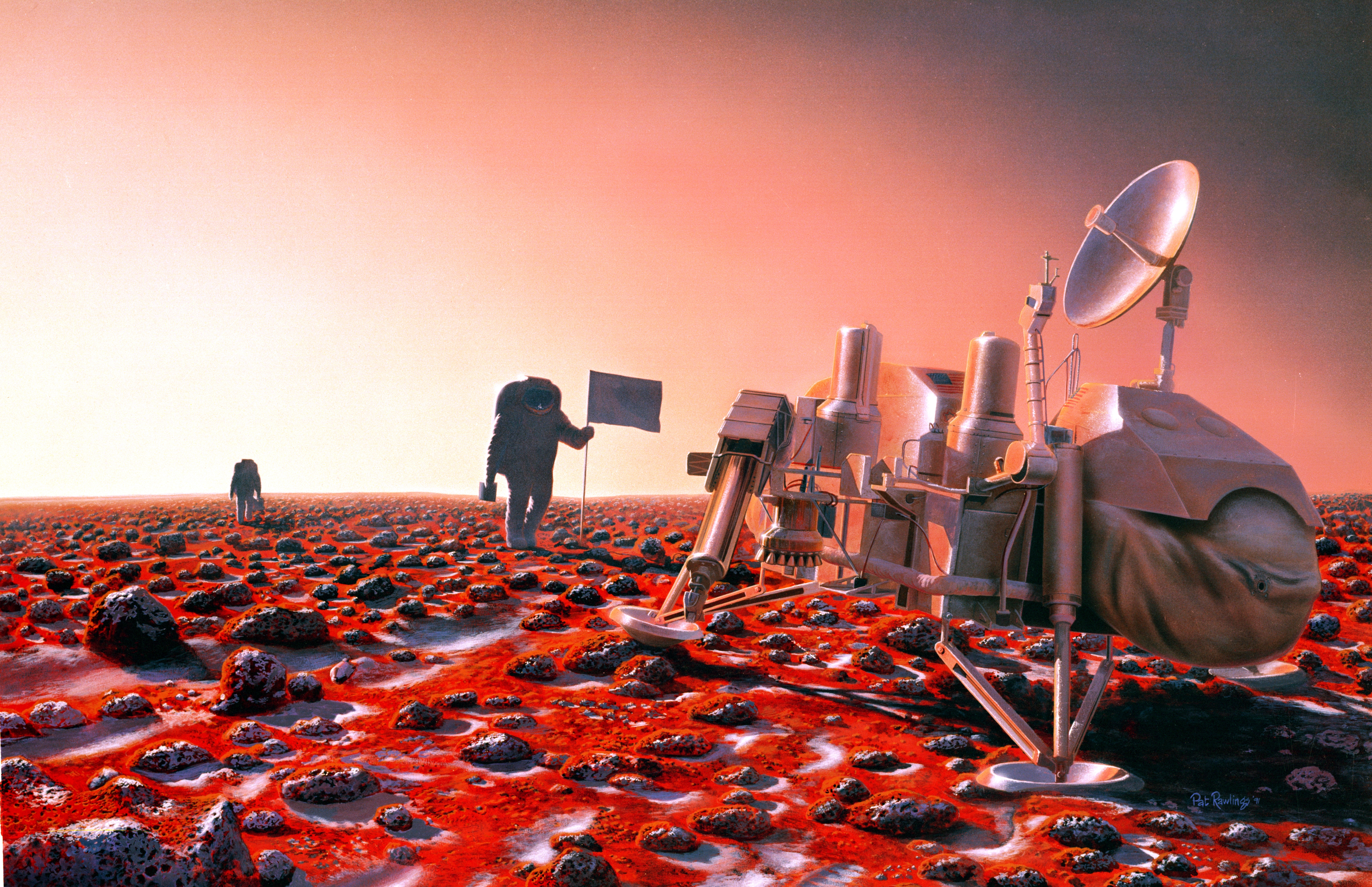
Space art illustrating a group approaching the Viking 2 lander probe, which were supported by RTG power

For a 500-day crewed Mars mission, NASA has studied using solar power and nuclear power for its base, as well as power storage systems (e.g. batteries). Some of the challenges for solar power include a reduction in solar intensity (because Mars is farther from the sun), dust accumulation, periodic dust storms, and storing power for night-time use. Global Mars dust storms cause lower temperatures and reduce sunlight reaching the surface. Two ideas for overcoming this are to use an additional array deployed during a dust storm and to use some nuclear power to provide base-line power that is not affected by the storms.

Lander power (examples)
Name	Main Power
Viking 1 & 2	Nuclear – RTG
Mars Pathfinder	Solar panels
MER A & B	Solar panels
Phoenix	Solar panels
MSL	Nuclear – RTG

NASA has studied nuclear-power fission systems in the 2010s for Mars surface missions. One design planned an output of 40 kilowatts. Nuclear power fission is independent of sunlight reaching the surface of Mars, which can be affected by dust storms.

Another idea for power is to beam the power to the surface from a solar power satellite to a rectifying antenna (rectenna) receiver. 245 GHz, laser, in-situ rectenna construction, and 5.8 GHz designs have been studied. One idea is to combine this technology with Solar Electric Propulsion to achieve a lower mass than surface solar power. The advantage of this approach to power is that the rectennas should be immune to dust and weather changes, and with the right orbit, a solar power Mars satellite could beam power continuously to the surface.

Technology to clean dust off the solar panels was considered for Mars Exploration Rover's development. In the 21st century, ways have been proposed for cleaning off solar panels on the surface of Mars. The effects of Martian surface dust on solar cells was studied in the 1990s by the Materials Adherence Experiment on Mars Pathfinder.

== History ==
NASA vision for the first humans on Mars (Artist Concept; 2019)

One early idea for a Mars habitat was to put short stay accommodation in a Mars descent/ascent vehicle. This combination was called a Mars Excursion Module, and also typically featured other components such as basic rover and science equipment. Later missions tended to shift to a dedicated descent/ascent with a separate habitat.

In 2013, ZA architects proposed having digging robots build a Mars habitat underground. They chose an interior inspired by Fingal's Cave and noted the increased protection from high-energy radiation below ground. The issue of the difficulty of sending digging robots that must construct the habitat versus landing capsules on the surface was also noted. An alternative may be to build above ground using thick ice to shield from radiation. This approach has the advantage of allowing light in.

In 2015, the Self-deployable Habitat for Extreme Environments project explored the idea of autonomous construction and preparation for Mars habitat versus human construction, because the latter is "risky, complex, and costly."

== NASA ==
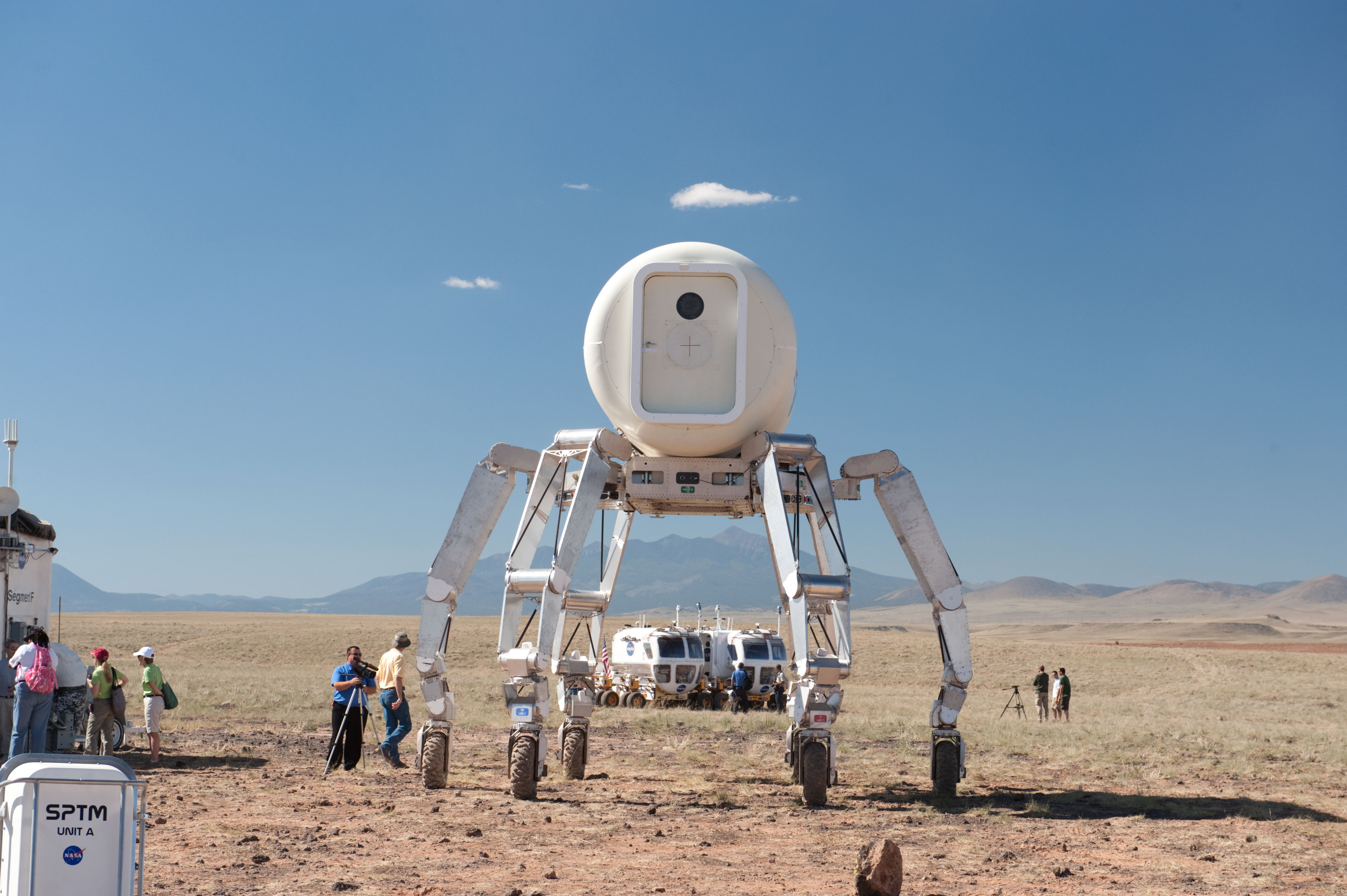
NASA six-legged mobile habitat module (TRI-ATHLETE)

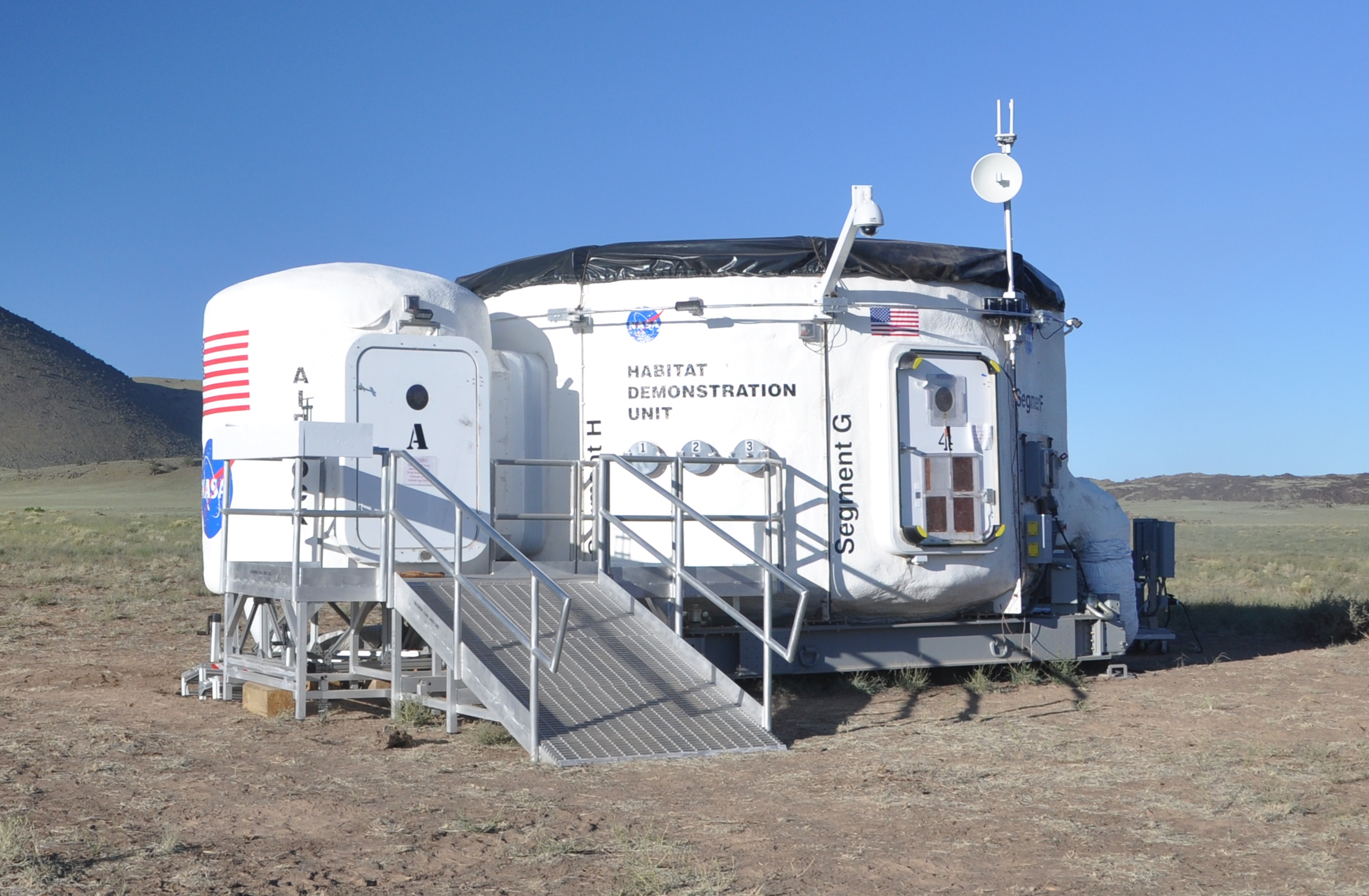
Habitat Demonstration Unit of the Desert Research and Technology Studies

In early 2015, NASA outlined a conceptual plan for a three stage Mars habitat design and construction award program. The first stage called for a design. The next stage requested plans for construction technology that used discarded spacecraft components. The third stage involved building a habitat using 3D printing technology.

In September 2015, NASA announced the winners of its 3D Printed Habitat Challenge. The winning submission titled 'Mars Ice House' by Clouds Architecture Office / SEArch proposed a 3D-printed double ice shell surrounding a lander module core. Two European teams were awarded runner up prizes. The contenders explored many possibilities for materials, with one suggesting separately refining iron and silica from the Martian dust and using the iron to make a lattice-work filled in with silica panels. There were 30 finalists selected from an initial pool of 165 entries in the habitat challenge. The second-place winner proposed the printing robots build a shield out of in-situ materials around inflatable modules.

Other NASA projects that have developed extraterrestrial surface habitats are the X-Hab challenge and the Habitation Systems Project.

The Sfero House by Fabulous, also a contender in the 3D Mars Habitat program, featured levels above and below ground. The proposed location was Gale crater (of Curiosity rover fame) with a focus on using both in-situ iron and water, which would hopefully be available there. It has a double-walled spherical design filled with water to both retain the higher pressure of Mars habitat and protect against radiation.

In 2016, NASA awarded the first prize of its In-Situ Materials Challenge to University of Southern California engineering professor Behrokh Khoshnevis "for Selective Separation Sintering – a 3D-printing process that makes use of powder-like materials found on Mars."

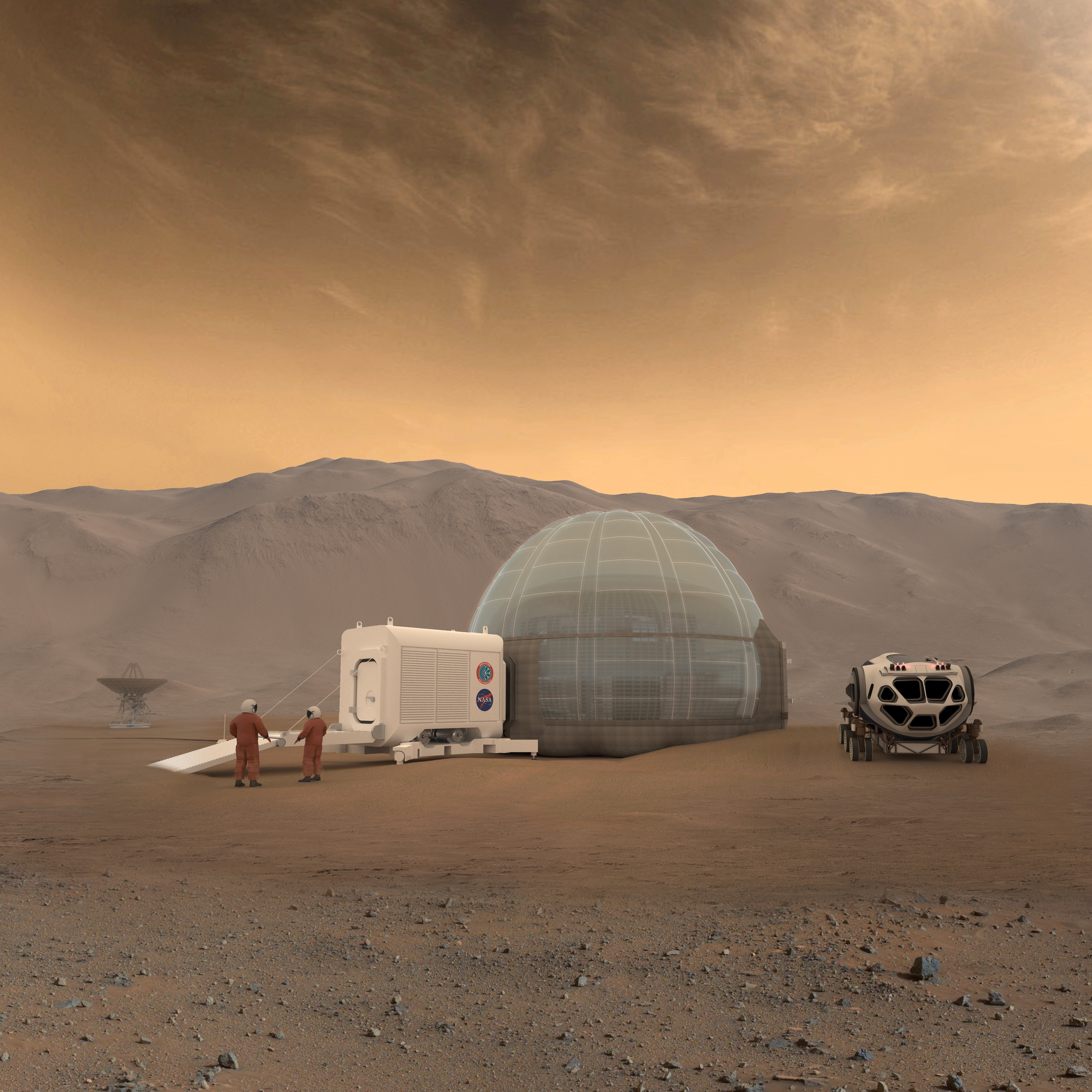
Mars Ice Home design for a Mars base (NASA LaRC / Clouds AO / SEArch+, 2016)

In 2016, NASA Langley showed the Mars Ice Home, which used in-situ water to make an ice structure conceptually similar to an igloo, as part of the design of a Mars habitat.

In June 2018, NASA selected the top ten finalists of Phase 3: Level 1 in the 3D-Printed Habitat Challenge.

Phase 3: Level 1 Winners:

- ALPHA Team – Marina Del Rey, California
- Colorado School of Mines and ICON – Golden, Colorado
- Hassell & EOC – San Francisco, California
- Kahn-Yates – Jackson, Mississippi
- Mars Incubator – New Haven, Connecticut
- AI. SpaceFactory – New York, New York
- Northwestern University – Evanston, Illinois
- SEArch+/Apis Cor – New York, New York
- Team Zopherus – Rogers, Arkansas
- X-Arc – San Antonio, Texas

In May 2019, NASA announced that the top winner of the 3D Printed Habitat Challenge was from AI SpaceFactory, with an entry called "Marsha," and several other prizes were awarded. In the final challenge, contestants had 30 hours to build 1/3 scale models using robotic construction technology.

== Mars analogs and analog habitat studies ==
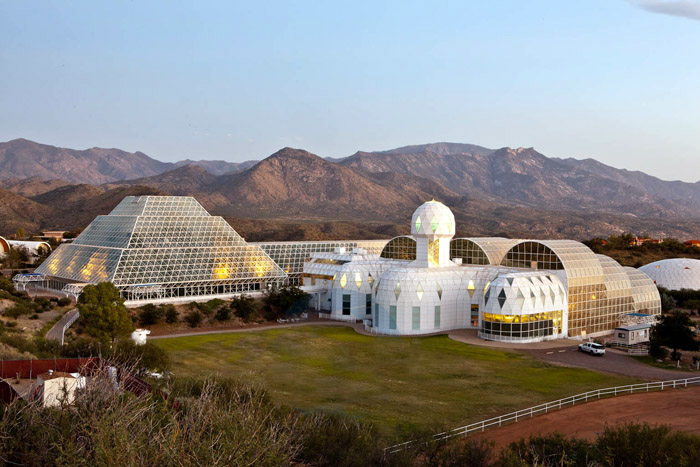
Biosphere 2, built in the United States, tested a closed-loop greenhouse and accommodation in the early 1990s

Mock Mars missions or Mars analog missions typically construct terrestrial habitats on Earth and conduct mock missions, taking steps to solve some of the problems that could be faced on Mars. An example of this was the original mission of Biosphere 2, which was meant to test closed ecological systems to support and maintain human life in outer space. Biosphere 2 tested several people living in a closed loop biological system, with several biological support areas including rainforest, savannah, ocean, desert, marsh, agriculture, and a living space.

Example of Mars analog comparison missions are:

- HI-SEAS
- Mars Desert Research Station
- Arctic Mars Analog Svalbard Expedition.
- Australia Mars Analog Research Station
- Flashline Mars Arctic Research Station
- MARS-500
- Concordia Station

The International Space Station has also been described as a predecessor to Mars expedition, and in relation to a Mars habitat the study importance and nature of operation a closed system was noted.

At about 28 miles (45 km, 150 thousand feet ) Earth altitude the pressure starts to be equivalent to Mars surface pressure.

An example of regolith simulant is Martian regolith simulant (further information about Mars analogs List of Mars analogs).

== Biodomes ==
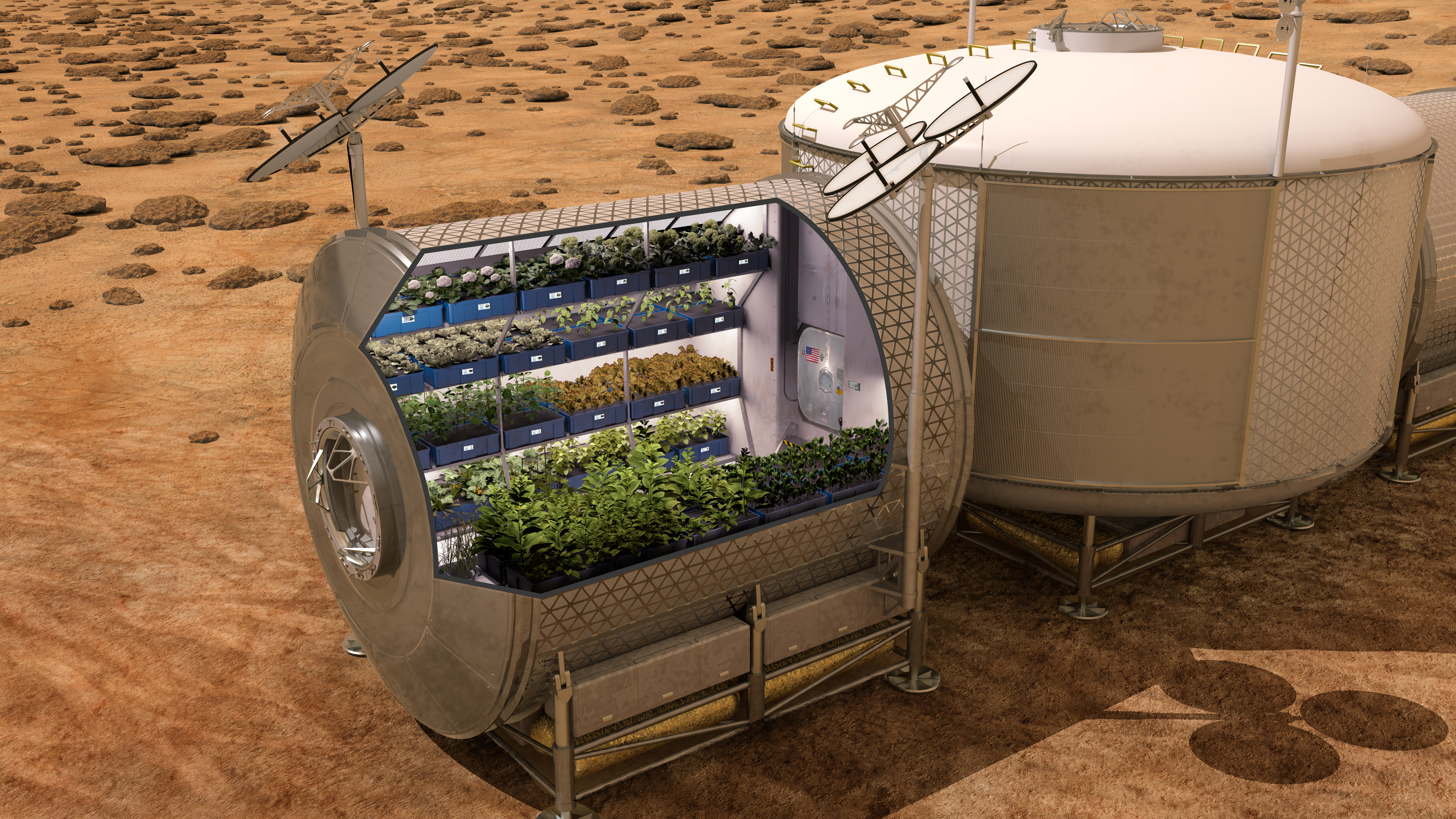
2015 NASA illustration of plants growing in a conceptualized Mars base.

One example concept that is or is in support of habitat is a Mars biodome, a structure that could hold life generating needed oxygen and food for humans. An example of activity in support of this goal was a program to develop bacteria that could convert the Martian regolith or ice into oxygen. Some issues with biodomes are the rate at which gas leaks out and the level of oxygen and other gases inside it.

One question for biodomes is how low the pressure could be lowered to, and the plants still be useful. In one study where air pressure was lowered to 1/10 of Earth's air pressure at the surface, the plants had a higher rate of evaporation from their leaves. This triggered the plant to respond as though there was drought, despite it having a steady supply of water. An example of a crop NASA tested growing at lower pressure is lettuce, and in another test green beans were grown at a standard air pressure, but in low Earth orbit inside the International Space Station.

The DLR found that some lichen and bacteria could survive in simulated Martian conditions, including air composition, pressure, and solar radiation spectrum. The Earth organisms survived for over 30 days under Mars conditions, and while it was not known if they would survive beyond this, it was noted they seemed to be performing photosynthesis under those conditions.

To convert the entirety of Mars into a biodome directly, scientists have suggested the cyanobacteria Chroococcidiopsis. This would help convert the regolith into soil by creating an organic element. That bacteria is known to survive in extremely cold and dry conditions on Earth, so might provide a basis for bioengineering Mars into a more habitable place. As the bacteria reproduces, dead bacteria would create an organic layer in the regolith potentially paving the way for more advanced life.

A study published in 2016 showed that cryptoendolithic fungi survived for 18 months in simulated Mars conditions.

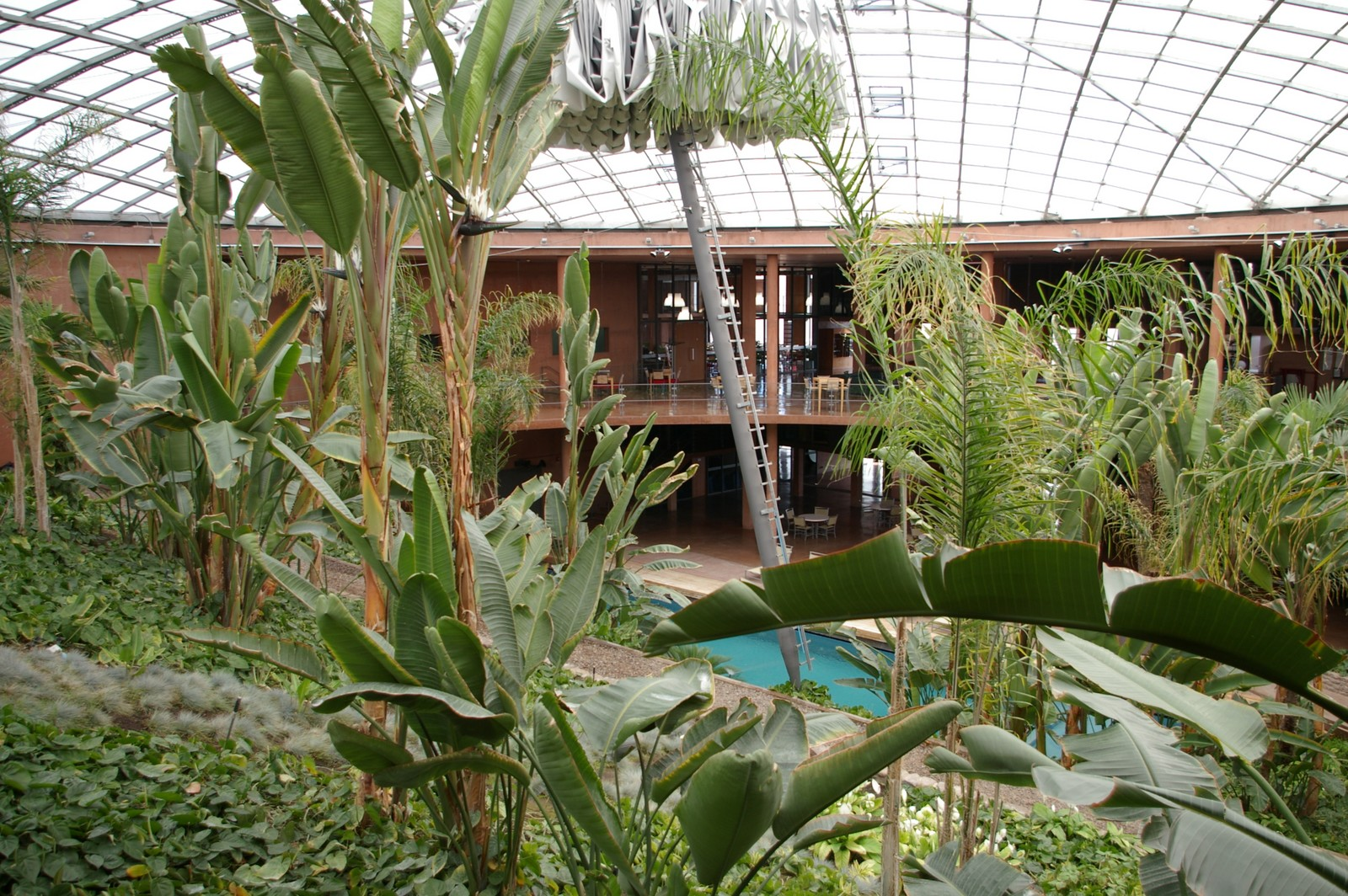
Interior of the ESO Hotel which has been called a "boarding house on Mars", because the desert surroundings are Mars-like; it houses observatory staff at an observatory in the high Chilean desert.

On Earth, plants that use the C4 photosynthesis reaction account for 3% of flowering plant species but 23% of carbon that is fixed, and includes species popular for human consumption including corn (aka maize) and sugar cane.

Certain types of plants may be more productive at producing food for a given amount of light. Plants noted for colonizing the barren landscape in the aftermath of the Mount Saint Helen's eruption included Asteraceae and Epilobium, and especially Lupinus lepidus for its (symbiotic) ability to fix its own nitrogen. Rhizobia bacteria are capable of fixing nitrogen.

== In-situ resources ==
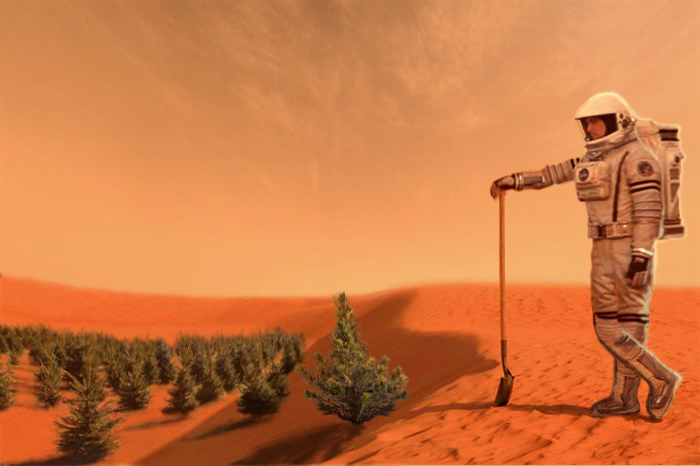
Pine trees have been suggested, in combination with other techniques for creating more hospitable atmosphere on Mars.

In situ resource utilization involves using materials encountered on Mars to produce materials needed. One idea for supporting a Mars habitat is to extract subterranean water, which, with sufficient power, could then be split into hydrogen and oxygen, with the intention of mixing the oxygen with nitrogen and argon for breathable air. The hydrogen can be combined with carbon dioxide to make plastics or methane for rocket fuel. Iron has also been suggested as a building material for 3D printed Mars habitats.

In the 2010s, the idea of using in-situ water to build an ice shield for protection from radiation and temperature, etc. appeared in designs.

A material processing plant could use Mars resources to reduce reliance on Earth provided material.

The Mars 2020 mission plan includes Mars Oxygen ISRU Experiment (MOXIE), which can convert Mars carbon dioxide into oxygen. MOXIE created 122 grams of oxygen in 2023.

To convert the whole of Mars into a habitat, increased air could come from vaporizing materials in the planet. In time lichen and moss might be established, and then eventually pine trees.

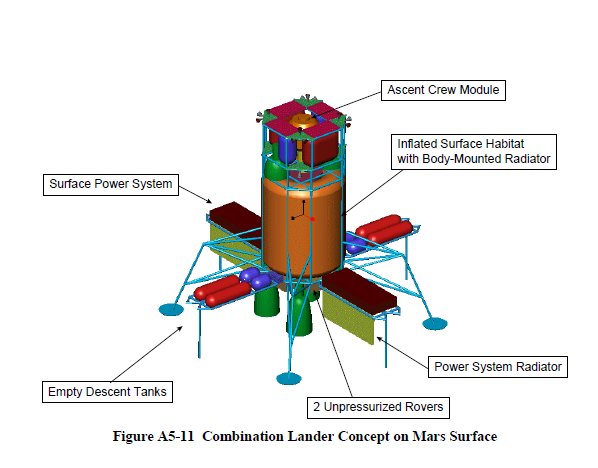
A concept for a combined surface habitat and ascent vehicle from the 1990s era Design Reference Mission 3.0-based mission, that integrated in-situ resources production in this case for propellant

There is a theory to make rocket fuel on Mars, by the Sabatier process. In this process, hydrogen and carbon dioxide are used to make methane and water. In the next step, the water is split into hydrogen and oxygen, with the oxygen and methane potentially being used for a Methane-Oxygen rocket engine, and the hydrogen could be re-used. This process requires a large input of energy, so an appropriate power source would be needed in addition to the reactants.

== See also ==
- Crewed Mars rover – Mars rovers transporting people, has some of the same requirements as habitats
- Climate of Mars
- Colonization of Mars
- Health threat from cosmic rays – Cancer causing exposure to ionizing radiation in spaceflight
- List of Mars analogs
- Mars analog habitat – Research simulating the environment on Mars
- Martian lava tube – Volcanic caverns on Mars
- Space architecture#Martian – Architecture of off-planet habitable structures
- ISS ECLSS – International Space Station life-support system
- List of artificial objects on Mars
- Mars Excursion Module – Proposed NASA spacecraft
