= Penelope Boston =

American speleologist

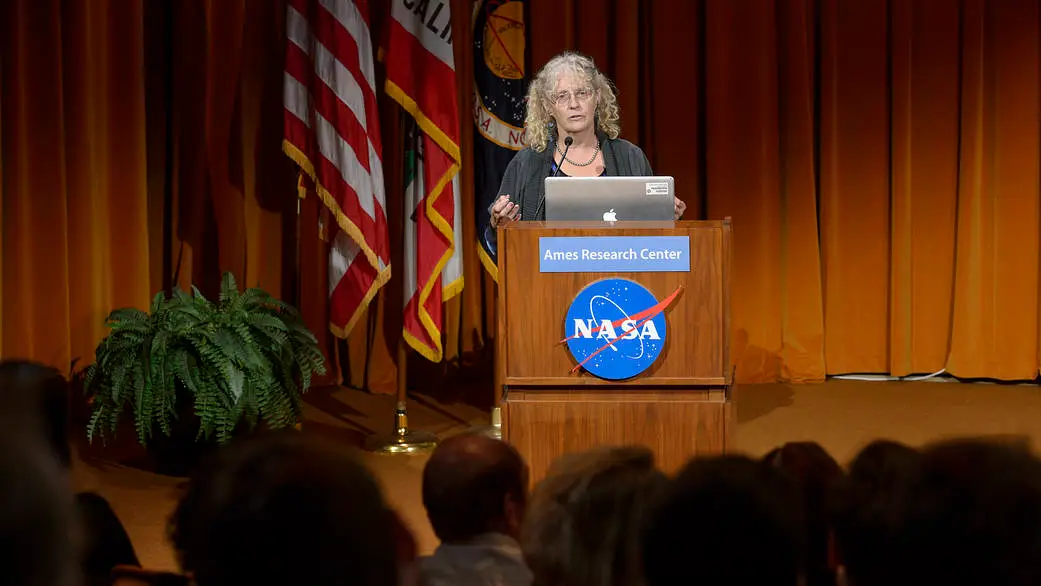
- Boston lecturing on Astrobiology
- Education: University of Colorado Boulder
- Scientific career
- Workplaces: National Cave and Karst Research Institute; NASA Astrobiology Institute
- Thesis: (1985)
- Website: www.ees.nmt.edu/pboston/

Penelope J. Boston is a speleologist and astrobiologist. She was associate director of the National Cave and Karst Research Institute in Carlsbad, New Mexico, along with founding and directing the Cave and Karst Studies Program at New Mexico Institute of Mining and Technology in Socorro. Among her research interests are geomicrobiology of caves and mines, extraterrestrial speleogenesis, and space exploration and astrobiology generally.

In the mid-1980s, Boston (then a graduate student at the University of Colorado Boulder) was one of the founders of the Mars Underground and helped organize a series of conferences called The Case for Mars. She was the last director of the NASA Astrobiology Institute before the Institute was suspended.

== Biography ==
She has a B.S. in microbiology, geology, and psychology, and a M.S. in microbiology and atmospheric chemistry. She completed her Ph.D. from University of Colorado Boulder in 1985. During 2002–2004, she was Principal Investigator on the Caves of Mars Project, which, among other things, studied the effects on mice of an atmosphere rich in argon, and "flat crops" that might be grown in Martian caves.

She developed the concept of small jumping robots for Mars exploration. She gave a TEDtalk about the likelihood of life on Mars in 2006.

Her interest is in extremophiles (organisms which prefer or thrive in the extremes of altitude, cold, darkness, dryness, heat, mineralized environments, pressure, radiation, vacuum, variability, or weightlessness) which may be found in caves and karst on Earth, and she thinks should be looked for in equivalents of other objects in space from asteroids to planets.

An only child of theatrical parents, she writes poetry reflective of her world travel and uncommon specialty. In 2010 she was featured in Symphony of Science. She continues to work with NASA on the Atacama Field Expedition.

She grew up in a non-traditional childhood: her parents were travelling performers, so she travelled widely during childhood. This influenced her perspective and how she relates to exploration.

== Bibliography ==
- Schneider, Stephen H.; Boston, Penelope J. (1993). Scientists on Gaia. Boston, MA: MIT Press. ISBN 978-0-262-69160-4.
- Boston, Penelope (2000). The Case for Mars V: proceedings of the fifth Case for Mars Conference. University of Colorado, Boulder: Univelt (for the American Astronautical Society). ISBN 978-0-87703-459-9.; held May 26–29, 1993, at the University of Colorado, Boulder, Colorado.
- Boston, Penelope (April 1984). The Case for Mars: proceedings of a conference held April 29-May 2, 1981 at University of Colorado Boulder (Science and Technology Series). American Astronautical Society. ISBN 978-0-87703-197-0.

== See also ==
- Caves of Mars Project
- The Case for Mars
