= Mars Outpost =

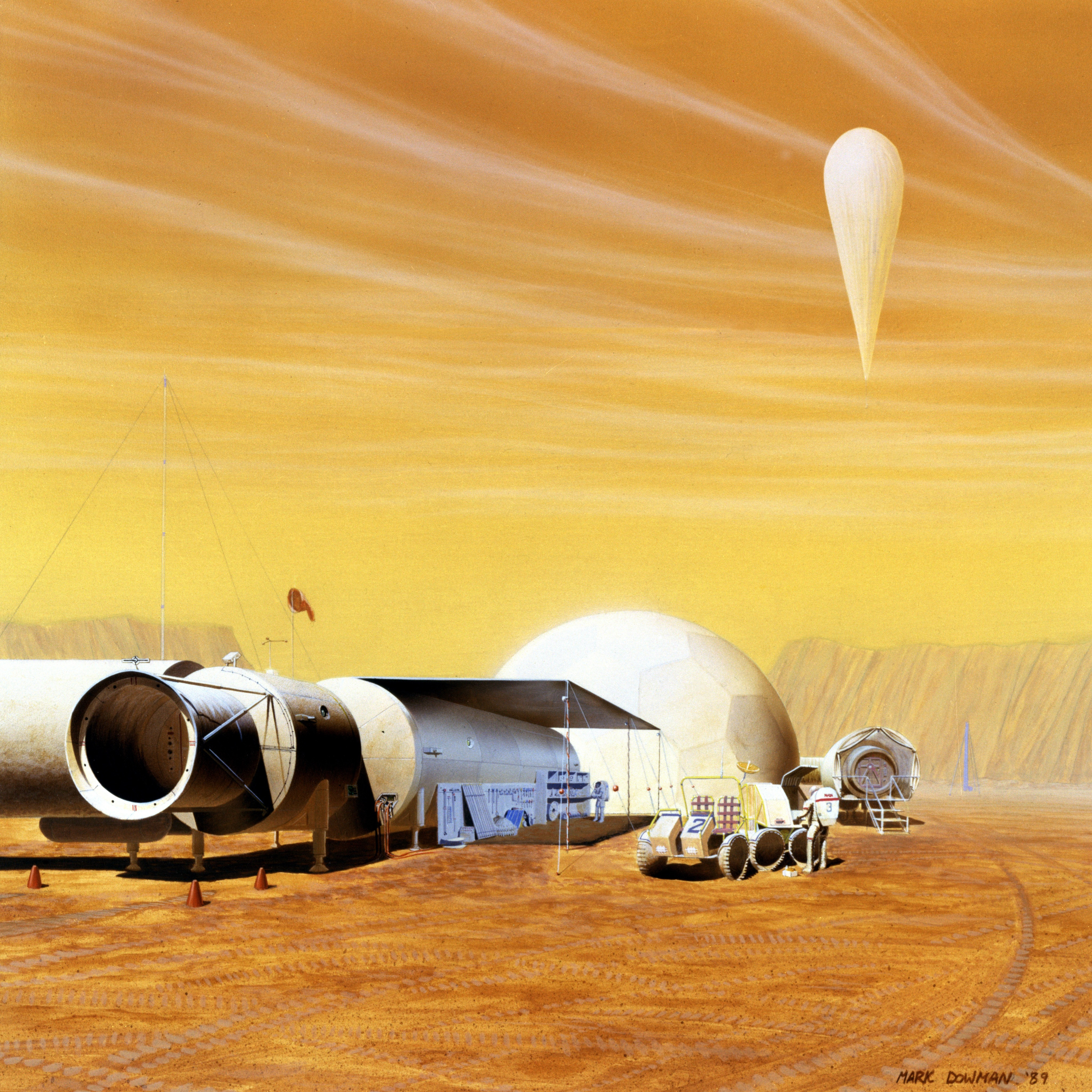
Various components of the 'Mars Outpost' proposal. (M. Dowman, 1989)

Mars Outpost is a concept for a human base on the planet Mars that was developed by the United States in the 1980s. The components and design were based on an earlier lunar test bed outpost. Development would go through several phases over four years, from an 'Emplacement Phase' to a 'Consolidation Phase', after which full use by its crew could commence. Components of the base would include a habitat module, pressurized rover dock/equipment lock, airlocks, and a 16 meters (17 yards) constructed habitat. The 16 m habitat would be constructed in situ. Other technology for the base design includes a meteorological balloon, unpressurized rover, storage/work area, an area for geophysical experiments, and an area antenna. The Mars Outpost would be designed for a crew of six to eight astronauts. Their main tasks would be to do research on mining of Mars and Phobos, life sciences, technology, and Solar System exploration. The Office of Space Exploration did case studies that include establishing a human presence on another planet in 1988 and 1989. An objective of the Mars Evolution 1989 study was, "Emplace a permanent, largely self-sufficient outpost on the surface of Mars."

The base had three main phases called Emplacement, Consolidation, and Utilization.

== See also ==
- Mars habitat
- Colonization of Mars
- Mars aircraft
