= Martian lava tube =

Volcanic caverns on Mars

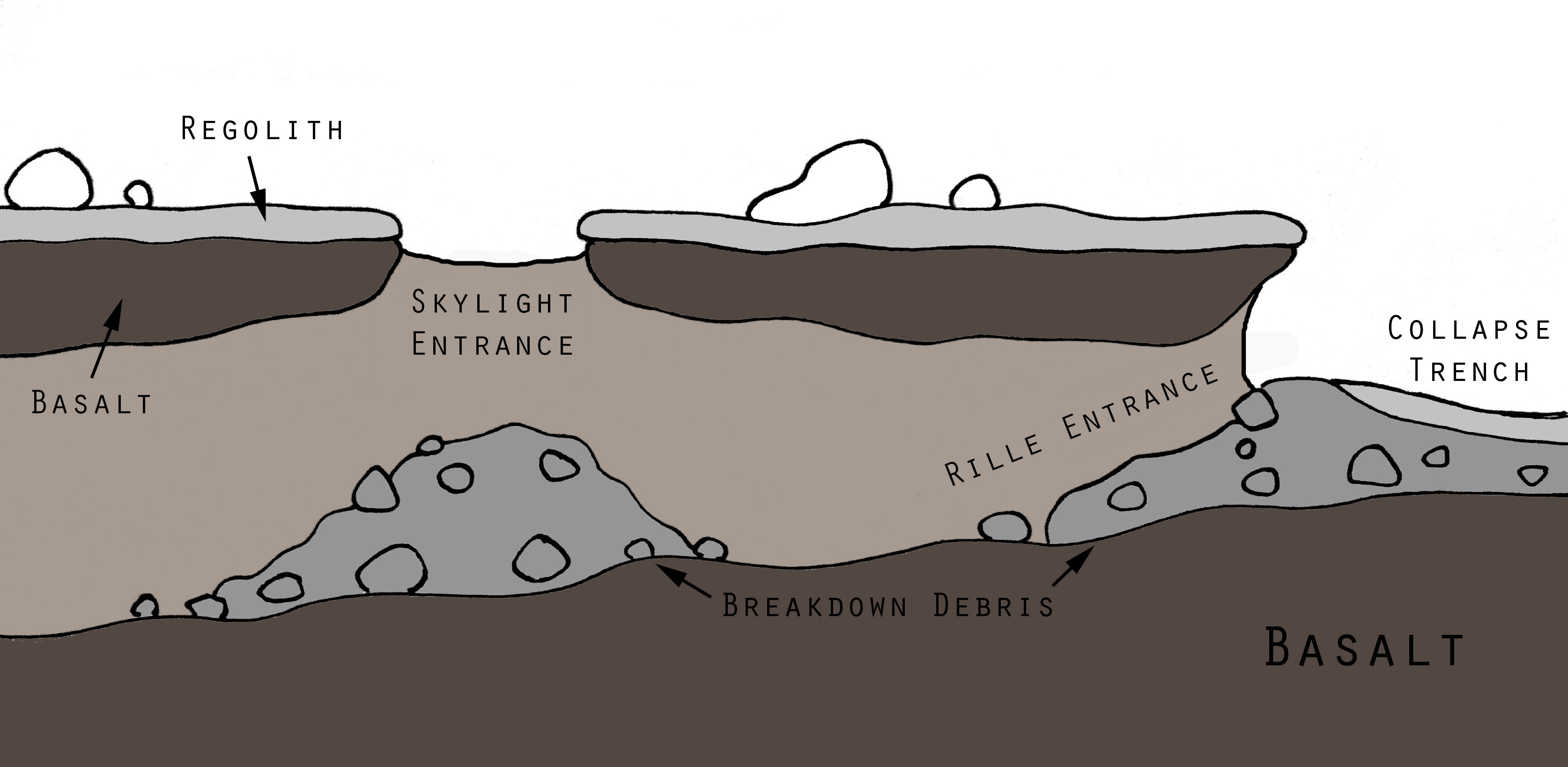
Longitudinal cross-section of a Martian lava tube with skylight

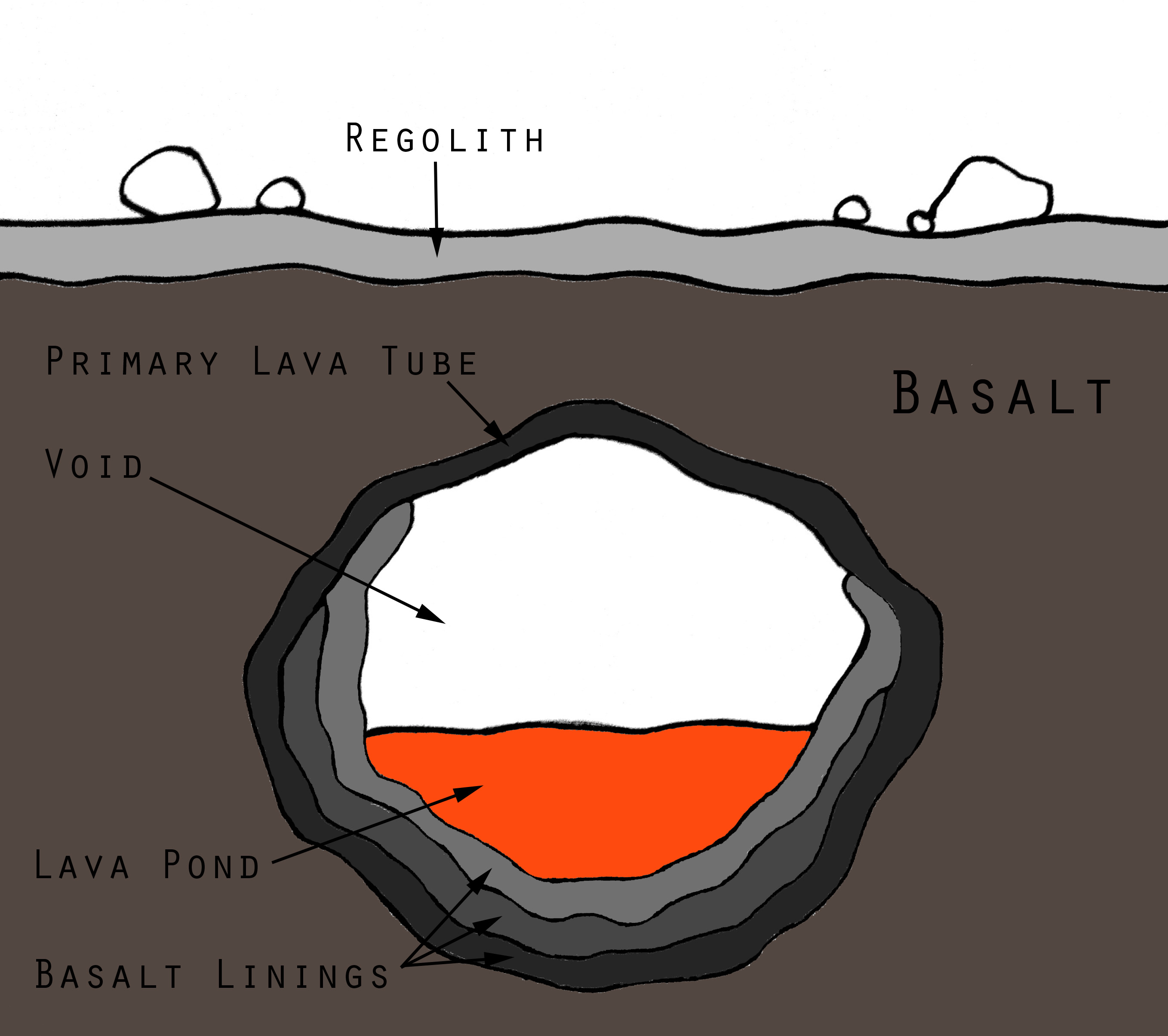
Transverse cross-section of a Martian lava tube

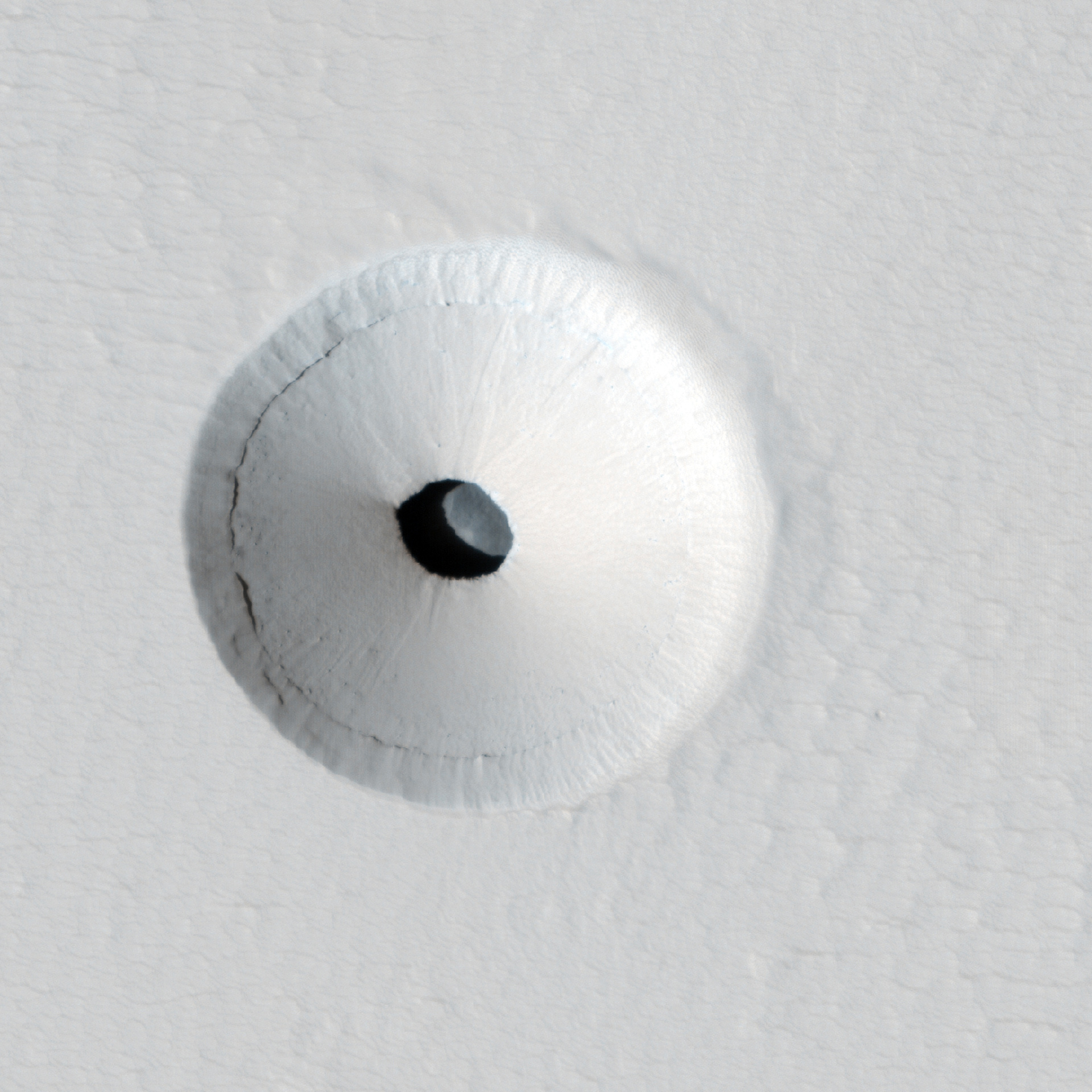
Cropped version of a HiRISE image of a lava tube skylight entrance on the Martian volcano Pavonis Mons.

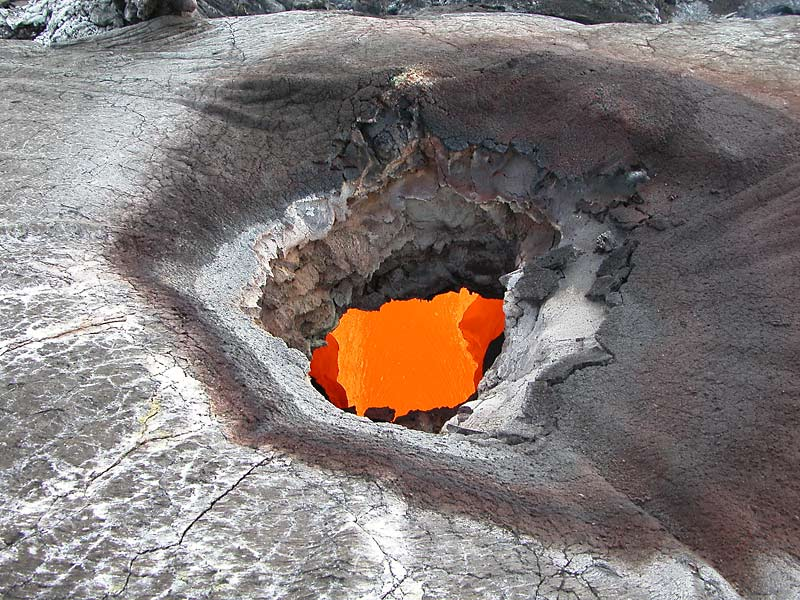
Petunia skylight in the roof of a lava tube associated with Prince Kuhio Kalaniana`ole (PKK) flows of Kīlauea on the Big Island of Hawaii. View looks downstream.

Martian lava tubes are volcanic caverns on Mars that are believed to form as a result of fast-moving, basaltic lava flows associated with shield volcanism. Lava tubes usually form when the external surface of the lava channels cools more quickly and forms a hardened crust over subsurface lava flows. The flow eventually ceases and drains out of the tube, leaving a conduit-shaped void space which is usually several meters below the surface. Lava tubes are typically associated with extremely fluid pahoehoe lava. Gravity on Mars is about 38% that of Earth's, allowing Martian lava tubes to be much larger in comparison.

== Detection and access ==
Lava tubes and related flow structures were first recognized upon examination of Viking orbiter images, and later identified using orbiter imagery from Mars Odyssey, Mars Global Surveyor, Mars Express, and Mars Reconnaissance Orbiter. Lava tubes can visually be detected two ways. The first is as long sinuous troughs known as rilles, which are believed to be the remains of collapsed lava tubes. The second method of possible identification is through observation of cave "skylights" or pit craters, which appear as dark, nearly circular features on the surface of Mars. In June, 2010, a group of seventh grade science students at Evergreen Middle School in Cottonwood, California, participating in the Mars Student Imaging Project, helped researchers discover a new series of lava tubes near Pavonis Mons through identification of a skylight estimated to be 190×160 meters wide and at least 115 meters deep. It is only the second skylight known to be associated with this volcano. In addition to orbital imagery, lava tubes could be detected through the use of:

- Atmospheric effects
- Gravimetry
- Ground-penetrating radar
- Human or robotic exploration
- Infrared
- Lidar
- Magnetometry
- Seismography

There has been increased interest in the identification and investigation of lava tubes because they could present scientists with information regarding the geological, paleohydrological, and perhaps biological histories of the planet. When speaking about lunar lava tubes, Dr. William "Red" Whittaker, CEO of Astrobotic Technology, states that "something so unique about the lava tubes is that they are the one destination that combines the trifecta of science, exploration, and resources." Access to uncollapsed sections of lava tubes can be done by entering at the end of rille, through skylights, or by drilling or blasting through the roof of a lava tube. Initial exploration of lava tubes may involve rovers, but with difficult challenges. Traditional skylights have large rubble piles directly below them (as seen in the first figure) which would be an obstacle for the rover. The vertical drop that the rover would have to perform would also have to be taken into consideration, as well as the ability of the rover to remain in communication with assets at the surface or in orbit.

=== Lava tube conditions ===
Gravity on Mars is about 38% that of Earth, allowing Martian lava tubes to be much larger in comparison. Lava tubes represent prime locations for direct observation of pristine bedrock where keys to the geological, paleohydrological, and possible biological history of Mars could be found. The surface of Mars experiences extreme temperature fluctuations and receives a high amount of Ionizing radiation due to the lack of a magnetic field and the planet's thin atmosphere, which is about one one-hundredth (or 1 percent) the thickness of Earth's. The thin atmosphere allows Mars to radiate heat energy away more easily, so temperatures near the equator can get up to 21 °C (70 °F) during a summer day, and then drop down to −73 °C (−99 °F) at night. Subsurface conditions on Mars are dramatically more benign than those on the surface, which lead researchers to believe that if life did (or does) exist on Mars, it would most likely be found in these more hospitable environments. Life forms would not only be protected from the high surface temperatures and ultraviolet radiation, but also from wind storms and regolith dust. Martian lava tubes could possibly trap volatiles such as water which is considered essential for life, and may also contain reservoirs of ancient ice since cold air can pool in lava tubes and temperatures remain stable. The ability to tap into these reservoirs may provide dramatic insight into the paleoclimatology and astrobiological histories of Mars.

== Possibilities for life on Mars ==
The discovery of Martian lava tubes has implications for the possibility of past or present life on Mars.

The magnetic and climatic histories of Mars and Earth are extremely different, and would have greatly dictated the evolution of both biospheres. Around four billion years ago, the Martian dynamo shut down following a proposed period when a long-lasting Noachian ocean existed, and when life may have existed at the surface. A sudden and intense increase of solar particles eliminated the atmospheric and hydrological protection, causing the atmosphere to thin and water to retreat from the surface. At this point, life may have sought refuge in subterranean environments such as lava tubes.

A wide range of organisms may have survived in the subsurface, such as chemolithotrophs and lithoautotrophs, and certain extremophiles like halophiles or psychrophiles. Microbes found on Earth have been discovered thriving in near-freezing temperatures and very low-oxygen air. This allows researchers to believe that organisms can live in similar extreme situations such as those on Mars where temperatures are colder and less oxygen is available. Volcanic minerals found in lava tubes could provide a rich source of nutrients to chemosynthetic organisms. Scientists are also interested in gaining access to Martian lava tubes because they could give insight into the processes that led to life on Earth since the geologic rock record is better preserved on Mars.

== Future human habitation ==
The interior of lava tubes, along with other subsurface cavities, could prove to be prime locations for future crewed missions to Mars by providing shelter for habitats. These natural caverns have roofs estimated to be tens of meters thick which would provide protection from the extreme conditions that would be experienced on the surface. The habitat would be protected from solar radiation, micrometeorites, extreme temperature fluctuations (ambient temperature is believed to be stable in lava tubes), winds, and regolith dust storms which could pose a threat to human health and technology. These natural shelters would also reduce the landed payload mass for crewed missions which would be economically advantageous.

== See also ==
- Lava tube – Natural conduit through which lava flows beneath the solid surface
- Lunar lava tube – Type of natural tunnel on the Moon
- Caves of Mars Project – Program to assess the best place for research and habitation modules on Mars
