= Caves of Mars Project =

Program to assess the best place for research and habitation modules on Mars

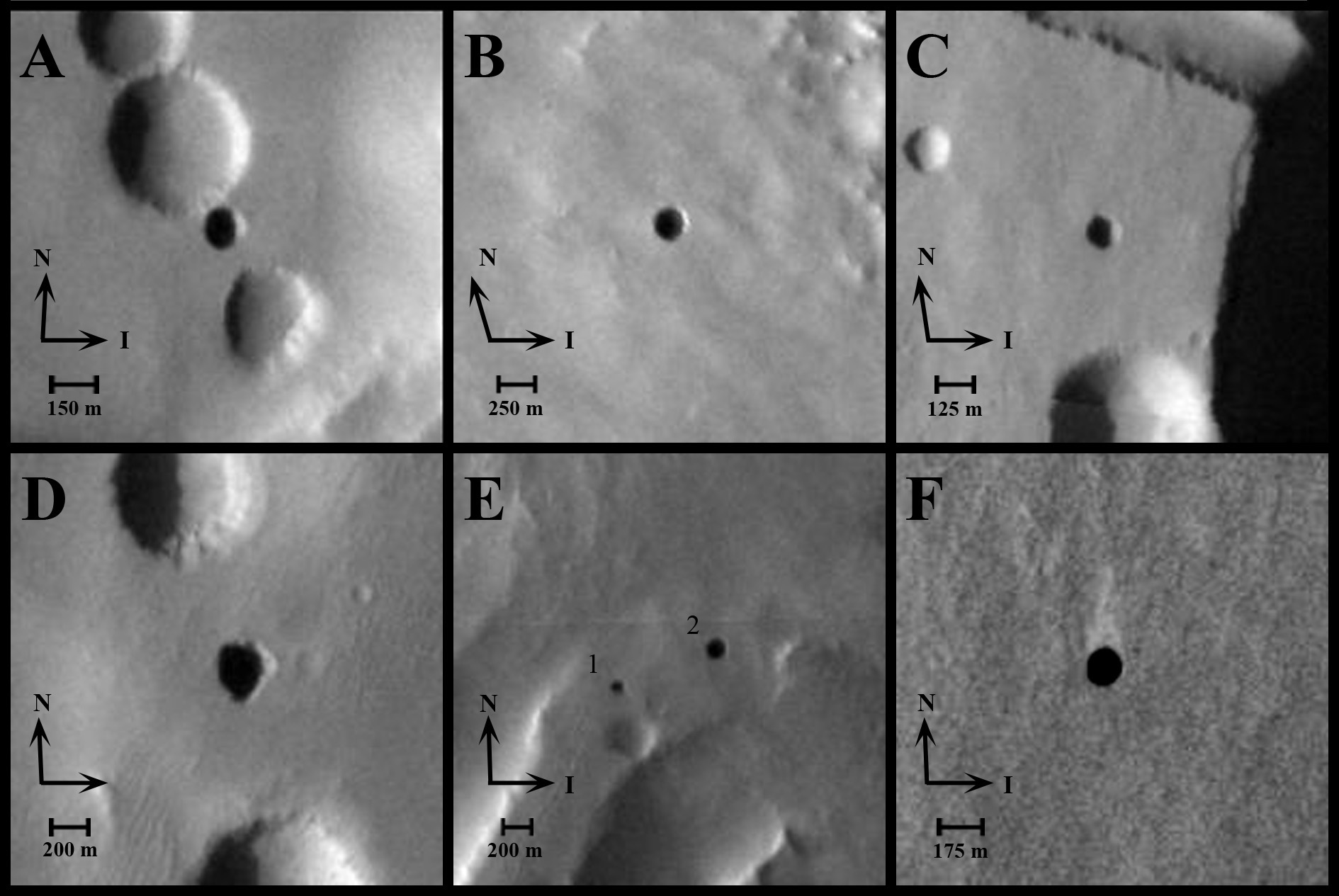
THEMIS image of probable cave entrances on Arsia Mons. The pits have been informally named (A) Dena, (B) Chloe, (C) Wendy, (D) Annie, (E) Abby (left) and Nikki, and (F) Jeanne.

The Caves of Mars Project was an early 2000s program funded through Phase II by the NASA Institute for Advanced Concepts, now known as the NASA Innovative Advanced Concepts to demonstrate the feasibility of constructing human habitats in Martian caves, lavatubes, and other subsurface voids to facilitate scientific research for a potential human mission to Mars. The final report was published in mid 2004.

== Description ==
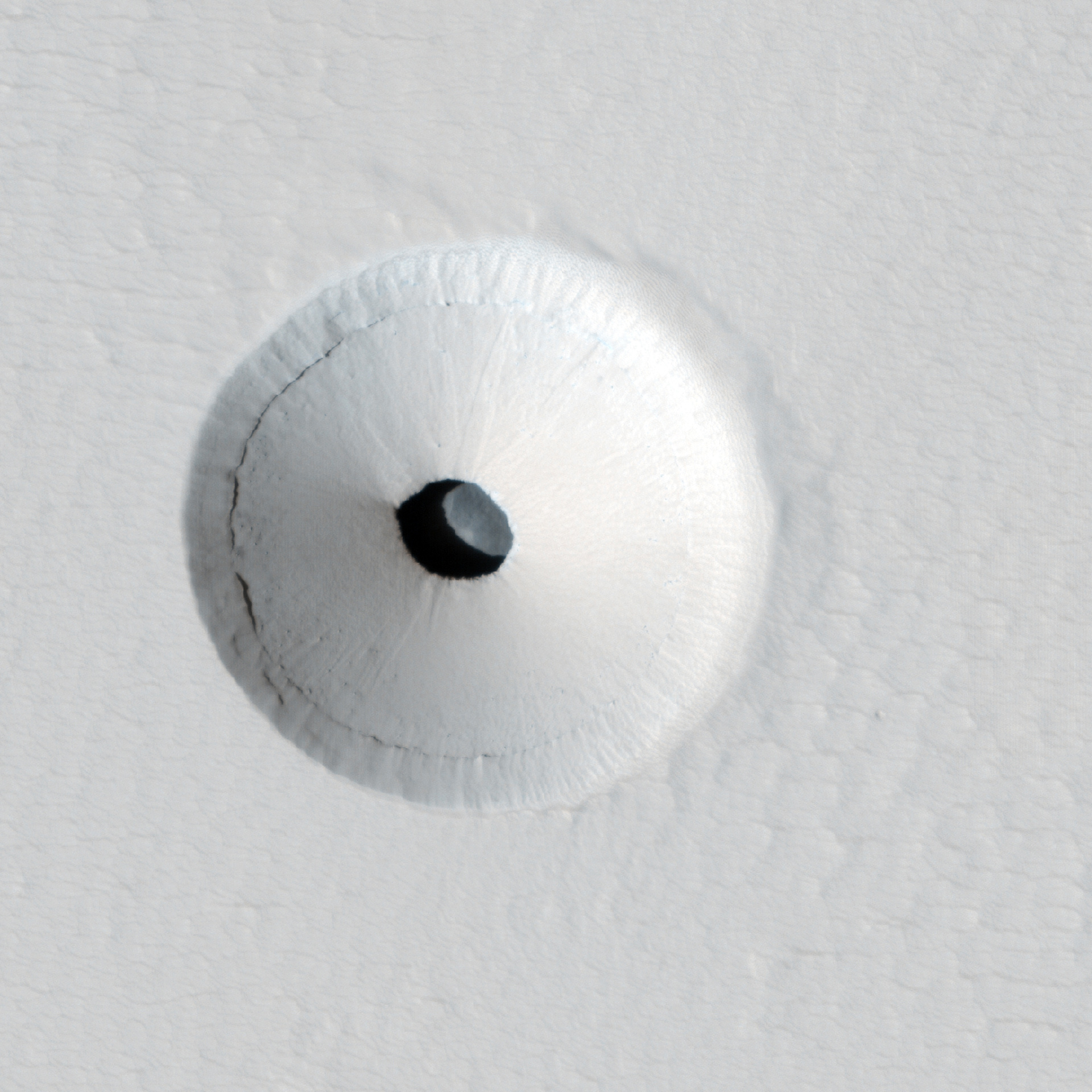
A HiRISE image of a lava tube skylight entrance on the Martian volcano Pavonis Mons.

The project spanned four major objectives. The primary, to demonstrate the feasibility of using easily deployable habitats for humans, plants, and animals in subsurface voids such as caves and lava tubes. Second, the project aimed to demonstrate the usefulness of these habits to scientific exploration on Mars. Third, it wanted to identify Martian features that could be simulated on Earth for further study. The fourth, and last objective identified by the final report was to demonstrate the feasibility of individual subcomponents of a habitat including airlock units, habitat modules, and telecommunication among other infrastructure to facilitate human life and research.

Underground structures such as caves were identified as potentially advantageous to crews missions to Mars for the protection they provide from the elements of the harsh Martian environment, and access to essential subsurfaces resources such as geothermal energy sources, and water.

Further, the project studied designs for inflatable modules and other such structures that would aid the astronauts to build a livable environment for humans and other Earthian creatures.

== Summary of final report ==
The final report, titled Human Utilization Of Subsurface Extraterrestrial Environments, is divided into 10 parts.

=== Project Summary ===
Section 1 summarizes the entire project and claims that "This project developed a revolutionary system to exploit the novel idea of extraterrestrial cave use" and explaining that two experiments or "Missions" were tested to gather data.

=== Introduction ===
Section 2 addresses the question of "why caves [for martian research bases]?" and provides a variety of different answers to the advantages of using caves as a foothold in Martian exploration such as:

- It is surmised that atmosphere temperature variations are less experienced in caves than on the surface of Mars.
- Caves protect lifeforms and equipment from harmful solar and galactic radiation.
- Caves protect from dust storms and micrometeorite impacts.
- Exploring caves is a key scientific interest as it makes it easy to study the geology, history, and possible presence of life on Mars without heavy excavation equipment.
- The ability of pressurizing caves to make them more habitable to human lifeforms.
- Allows the easy extraction of subsurface materials such as ice and minerals.

This section also contains some speculation on the existence and locations of such caves and what types of caves exist on Mars however it is largely outdated by newer research such as the HiRISE and THEMIS missions.

=== Enabling Technologies Identification ===
Section 3 analyses a number of Innovations necessary for the utilization and assigns them a Technology Readiness Level. For example, the innovation "Foamed-in-place Airlocks" are assigned a TRL of 5, while the "Inert Pressurization of Caves" is assigned a TRL of 2.

=== Essential Tasks Identification ===
Section 4 describes the steps necessary for cave habitation. These are:

- Finding extraterrestrial caves
- Protecting the scientific environment inside of a cave
- Dealing with the dark (providing lighting solutions for the interior of the habitats)
- Cave Life support

The publication discusses each of these topics in detail and highlights the novel idea of using luminescent bacteria as a lighting backup solution and suggests lighting the habitat using "light piping" technology. The article also discusses skylights and radiation proof glass at length however this is probably due to the lack of advanced solar panels and LED lighting technology available during the publication in 2000.

=== Demonstration Missions ===
Section 5 contains information on the "Mouse Mission to Inner Space" (MOMIS) and the Human equivalent, "HUMIS". The idea was to develop preliminary versions of some aspects of a Mars cave habitat such as using argon breathing mixtures and other new life support systems on mouse test subjects. The MOMIS experiment has successfully completed multiple runs however the HUMIS experiment was deemed out of the scope of the investigation and although efforts were made to find test sites, the work done was reflected in a "Cave Astrobiology" exploration-level class at Penn State College during the spring semester of 2004.

=== Technology Trials ===
Section 6 covers the different technology tests performed.

First, inflatable habitats were investigated to provide a "shirtsleeve indoor environment" for the astronauts. The article further suggests that if the cave's cross sectional surface area is properly sized, an inflatable cave liner could be placed in the cave and inflated requiring no additional support systems. The article then suggests using a dual-liner system in which an outer liner provides a surface against the cave surface and a pressure seal and an inner liner provides a habitat for the astronauts. Machinery and life support systems could be placed in between the redundant liners. The report also outlines methods of folding, manufacturing, transporting, replacing, and inflating these liners.

Another main topic of this section is the "foamed in place" airlocks. These are designed to be shape-conforming to highly irregular openings along with easy to deploy and leak tight. Their final proposed system is an airlock unit with multiple extending telescoping legs to all of the cave walls. The space between the airlocks and the cave walls are then filled with hardening, spray-able, airtight foam.

Next, the report outlines methods by which an inert pressure atmosphere could be created by pressurizing the gasses present on Mars, particularly Argon. This would allow human scientists only to wear breathing apparatuses and not require full pressure suits. It is suggested that cavernous spaces not be filled with oxygen or other reactive gasses as this would nullify any potential scientific value of the cave along with potentially being harmful to the humans breathing in the atmosphere inside.

Finally, this section covers a system that would allow communication networks inside caves. This was also tested in a real cave (Robertson's Cave) and future modifications are suggested for increasing bandwidth and signal strength.

=== Planetary Protection Protocol Development ===
Section 7 covers the development of a Planetary Protection Protocol and highlights its importance when exploring martian caves and suggests using "sterilized micro-robots" to perform exploration and science.

=== Education and Outreach ===
Section 8 contains information on the spinoff science-fair experiments generated from this report and the other outreach impacts that this report and creating it had. This section also outlines educational activities for schools such as a "Find the lava tube activity" and "The Masternauts Program".

=== Conclusions and references ===
Sections 9 and 10 conclude the report and cite references for further reading.

== Results ==
The project showed crickets and mice could breathe argon mixtures for extended periods without apparent problems.

The project produced many educational materials, made available through its outreach initiative.

Demonstrated wireless communications within limestone cave system.

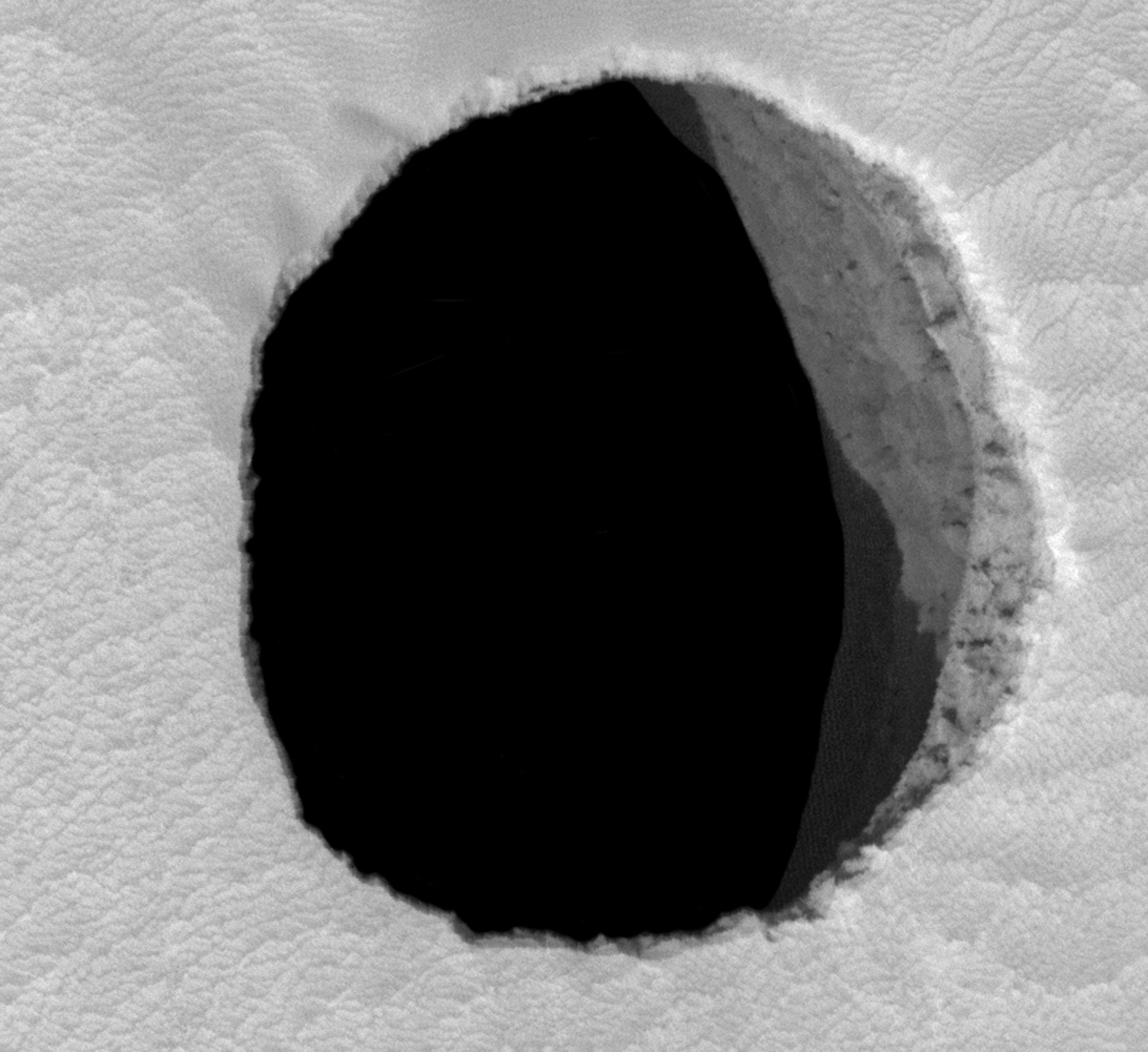
HiRISE image of Mars hole "Jeanne", about 150 meters (492 feet) across and at least 178 meters (584 feet) deep.

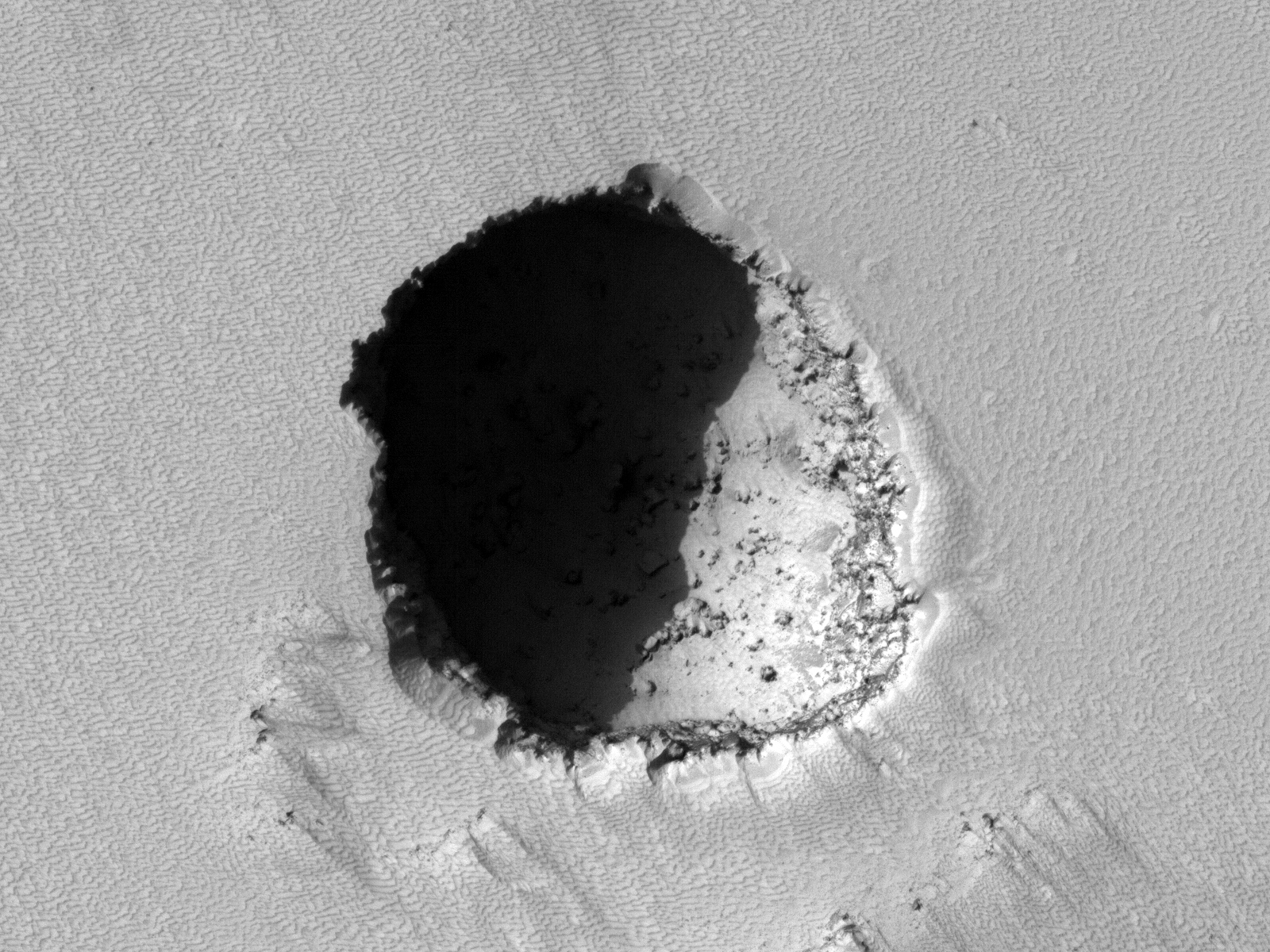
HiRISE image of a 180 m wide lava tube skylight on the southeast flank of Pavonis Mons.

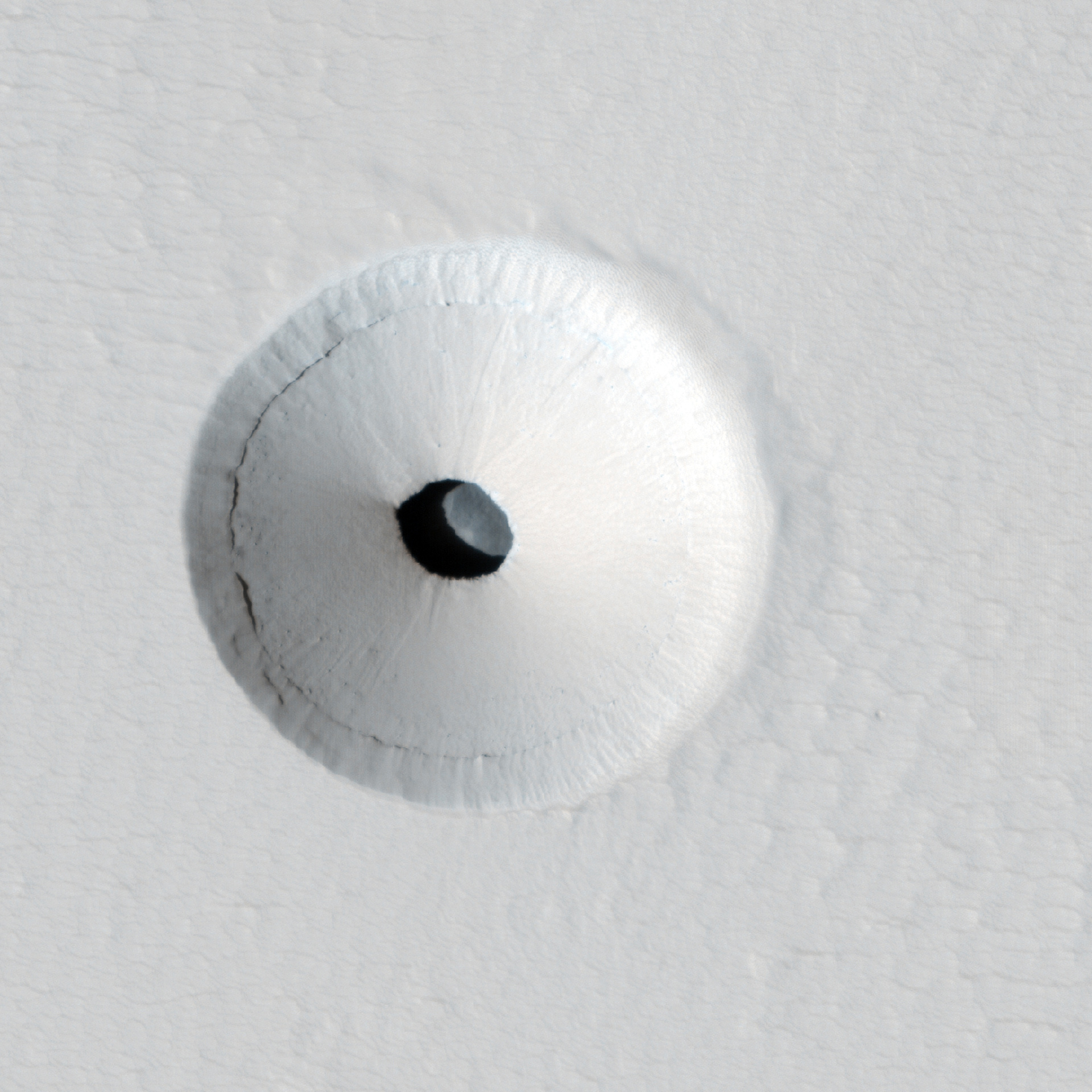
HiRISE image of a 35 m wide lava tube skylight surrounded by a collapse pit on Pavonis Mons.

== See also ==
- Exploration of Mars
- Colonization of Mars
- Martian lava tube
