= Colonization of Mars =

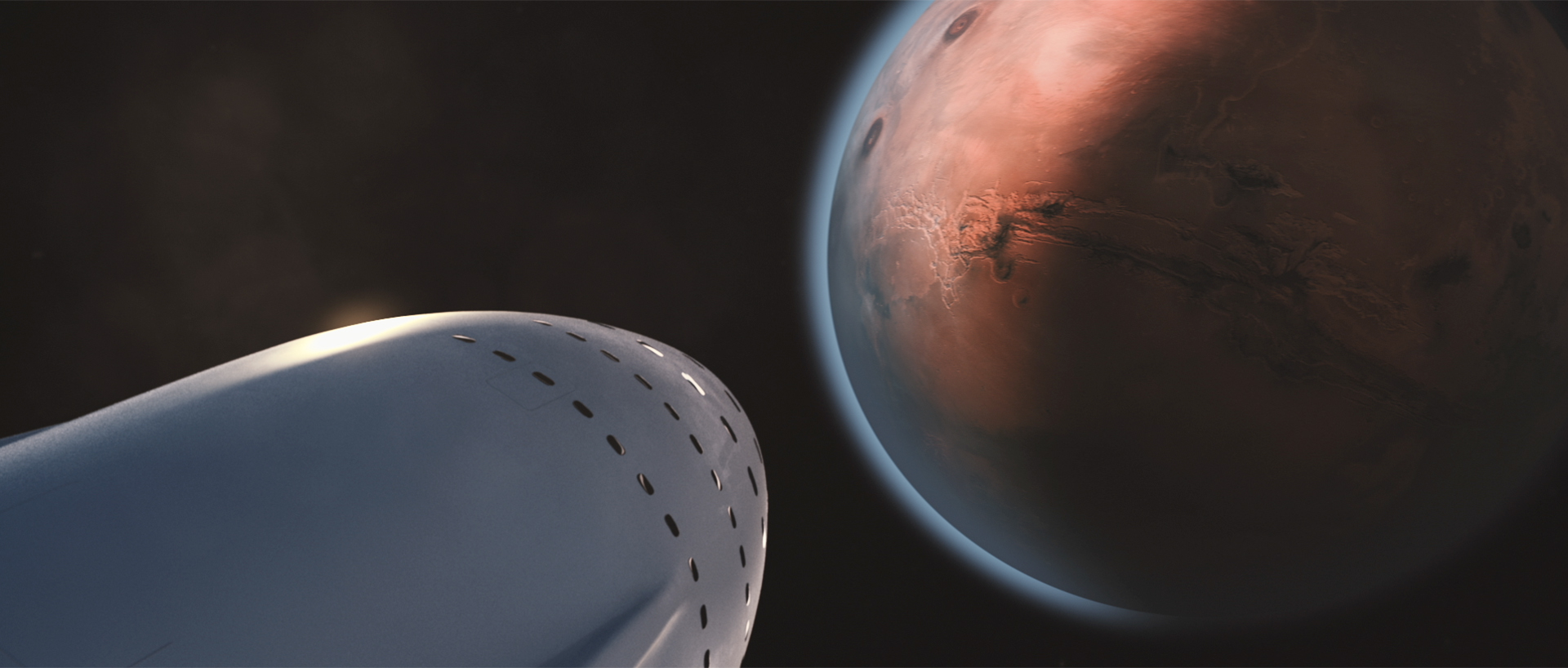
A rendering of the Interplanetary Transport System approaching Mars, a concept colony ship of the in-development SpaceX Mars Colonization Program

The colonization of Mars is the proposed process of establishing permanent human settlements on the planet Mars. While most colonization concepts focus on settling, colonization is a broader ethical concept. International space law has limited colonization, and national space programs have avoided it, instead focusing on human missions to Mars for exploring the planet. The settlement of Mars would require the migration of humans to the planet, the establishment of a permanent human presence, and the use of local resources.

Despite the absence of crewed missions to Mars, there have been successful robotic missions to the planet. Public space agencies (including NASA, ESA, Roscosmos, ISRO, and the CNSA, among others) have explored colonization concepts, but have primarily focused on further robotic exploration of Mars and the possibility of crewed landings. Some space advocacy groups, such as the Mars Society and the National Space Society, as well as some private organizations, such as SpaceX, have promoted the idea of colonization. The prospect of settling Mars has been a recurrent theme in science fiction literature, cinema, and the arts.

Challenges to settlement include the intense ionizing radiation that impacts the Martian surface, and the fine, toxic dust that covers the planet. Mars has an atmosphere, but it is unbreathable and thin. Surface temperatures fluctuate widely, between −70 and 0 °C (−94 and 32 °F). While Mars has underground water and other resources, conditions do not favor power production using wind and solar; similarly, the planet has few resources for nuclear power. Mars's orbit is the third closest to Earth's orbit, though far enough from Earth that the distance would present a serious obstacle to the movement of materiel and settlers. Justifications and motivations for colonizing Mars include technological curiosity, the opportunity to conduct in-depth observational research, the possibility that the settlement of other planets could decrease the probability of human extinction, the interest in establishing a colony independent of Earth, and the potential benefits of economic exploitation of the planet's resources.

== Background ==
=== Terminology ===
Colonization of Mars differs from the crewed Mars exploration missions currently pursued by public space agencies, as they aim to land humans for exploration.

The terminology used to refer a potential human presence on Mars has been scrutinized since at least the 2010s, with space colonization in general since 1977, as by Carl Sagan, who preferred to refer to settlements in space as cities instead of colonies because of the implied colonialism; the US State Department had already made clear to avoid the use of the term because of the colonialist meaning. Today, "settlement" is preferred out of similar reasons, trying to avoid the broad sociopolitical connotations of colonization.

Today, the term is most prominently used by Robert Zubrin and the SpaceX Mars colonization program, with the term Occupy Mars also being used, aspiring for an independent Mars colony, despite limiting international space law.

=== Mission concepts ===
Landers and rovers have successfully explored the surface of Mars and delivered information about conditions on the ground. The first successful lander, Viking 1, landed on the planet in 1976.

Crewed missions to Mars have been proposed, but no person has attempted to travel to the planet, and there have been no return missions. Most of the human mission concepts as currently conceived by national governmental space programs would not be direct precursors to colonization. Programs such as those being tentatively planned by NASA, Roscosmos, and ESA are intended solely as exploration missions, with the establishment of a permanent base possible but not yet the main goal. Colonization requires the establishment of permanent habitats that have the potential for self-expansion and self-sustenance. Two early proposals for building habitats on Mars are the Mars Direct and the Semi-Direct concepts, advocated by Robert Zubrin, an advocate of the colonization of Mars.

At the February 2017 World Government Summit, the United Arab Emirates announced a plan to establish a settlement on Mars by 2117, led by the Mohammed bin Rashid Space Centre.

== Comparisons between Earth and Mars ==
Atmospheric pressure comparison
Location	Pressure
Olympus Mons summit	72 Pa (0.0104 psi) (0.0007 atm)
Mars average	610 Pa (0.088 psi) (0.006 atm)
Hellas Planitia bottom	1.16 kPa (0.168 psi) (0.0114 atm)
Armstrong limit	6.25 kPa (0.906 psi) (0.0617 atm)
Mount Everest summit	33.7 kPa (4.89 psi) (0.3326 atm)
Earth sea level	101.3 kPa (14.69 psi) (1 atm)

=== Gravity and size ===
The surface gravity of Mars is just 38% that of Earth. Although microgravity is known to cause health problems such as muscle loss and bone demineralization, it is not known if Martian gravity would have a similar effect. The Mars Gravity Biosatellite was a proposed project designed to learn more about what effect Mars's lower surface gravity would have on humans, but it was cancelled due to a lack of funding.

Mars has a surface area that is 28.4% of Earth's, which is only slightly less than the amount of dry land on Earth (which is 29.2% of Earth's surface). Mars has half the radius of Earth and one-tenth the mass. This means that it has a smaller volume (≈15%) and lower average density than Earth.

=== Magnetosphere ===
Due to the lack of a magnetosphere, solar particle events and cosmic rays can easily reach the Martian surface.

=== Atmosphere ===
Atmospheric pressure on Mars is far below the Armstrong limit at which people can survive without pressure suits. Since terraforming cannot be expected as a near-term solution, habitable structures on Mars would need to be constructed with pressure vessels similar to spacecraft, capable of containing a pressure between 30 and 100 kPa. The atmosphere is also toxic as most of it consists of carbon dioxide (95% carbon dioxide, 3% nitrogen, 1.6% argon, and traces totaling less than 0.4% of other gases, including oxygen).

This thin atmosphere does not filter out ultraviolet sunlight, which causes instability in the molecular bonds between atoms. For example, ammonia (NH_{3}) is not stable in the Martian atmosphere and breaks down after a few hours. Also due to the thinness of the atmosphere, the temperature difference between day and night is much larger than on Earth, typically around 70 °C. However, the day/night temperature variation is much lower during dust storms when little light gets through to the surface even during the day, and instead warms the middle atmosphere.

=== Water and climate ===
Water on Mars is scarce, with rovers Spirit and Opportunity finding less than in Earth's driest desert (which is The Atacama Desert in northern Chile).

The climate is much colder than Earth, with mean surface temperatures between 186 and 268 K (−87 and −5 °C) (depending on the season and latitude). The lowest temperature ever recorded on Earth was 184 K (−89.2 °C) in Antarctica.

Because Mars is about 52% farther from the Sun than is the Earth, the amount of solar energy entering its upper atmosphere per unit area (the solar constant) is around 43.3% of what reaches the Earth's upper atmosphere. However, due to the much thinner atmosphere, a higher fraction of the solar energy reaches the surface as radiation. The maximum solar irradiance on Mars is about 590 W/m^{2} compared to about 1000 W/m^{2} at the Earth's surface; optimal conditions on the Martian equator can be compared to those on Devon Island in the Canadian Arctic in June. Mars's orbit is more eccentric than Earth's, increasing temperature and solar constant variations over the course of the Martian year. Mars has no rain and virtually no clouds, so although cold, it is permanently sunny (apart from during dust storms). This means solar panels can always operate at maximum efficiency on dust-free days.

Global dust storms are common throughout the year and can cover the entire planet for weeks, blocking sunlight from reaching the surface. This has been observed to cause temperature drops of 4 °C for several months after the storm. In contrast, the only comparable events on Earth are infrequent large volcanic eruptions such as the Krakatoa event which threw large amounts of ash into the atmosphere in 1883, causing a global temperature drop of around 1 °C. These dust storms would affect electricity production from solar panels for long periods, and interfere with communications with Earth.

==== Temperature and seasons ====
Mars has an axial tilt of 25.19°, similar to Earth's 23.44°. As a result, Mars has seasons much like Earth, though on average they last nearly twice as long because the Martian year is about 1.88 Earth years. Mars's temperature regime is more similar to Earth's than to any other planet's in the Solar System. While generally colder than Earth, Mars can have Earth-like temperatures in some areas and at certain times.

=== Soil ===
The Martian soil is toxic due to relatively high concentrations of chlorine and associated compounds, such as perchlorates, which are hazardous to all known forms of life, even though some halotolerant microorganisms might be able to cope with enhanced perchlorate concentrations by drawing on physiological adaptations similar to those observed in the yeast Debaryomyces hansenii exposed in lab experiments to increasing NaClO_{4} concentrations.

The perchlorates may form a key component of solid rocket propellant, combining with other materials via resonant acoustic mixing.

=== Survivability ===
Plants and animals cannot survive the ambient conditions on the surface of Mars. However, some extremophile organisms that survive in hostile conditions on Earth have endured periods of exposure to environments that approximate some of the conditions found on Mars.

=== Length of day ===
The Martian day (or sol) is close in duration to Earth's. A solar day on Mars is 24 hours, 39 minutes and 35.244 seconds.

== Conditions for human habitation ==
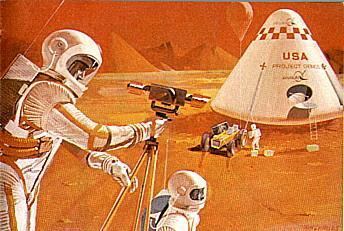
An expedition-style crewed mission would operate on the surface, but for limited amounts of time.

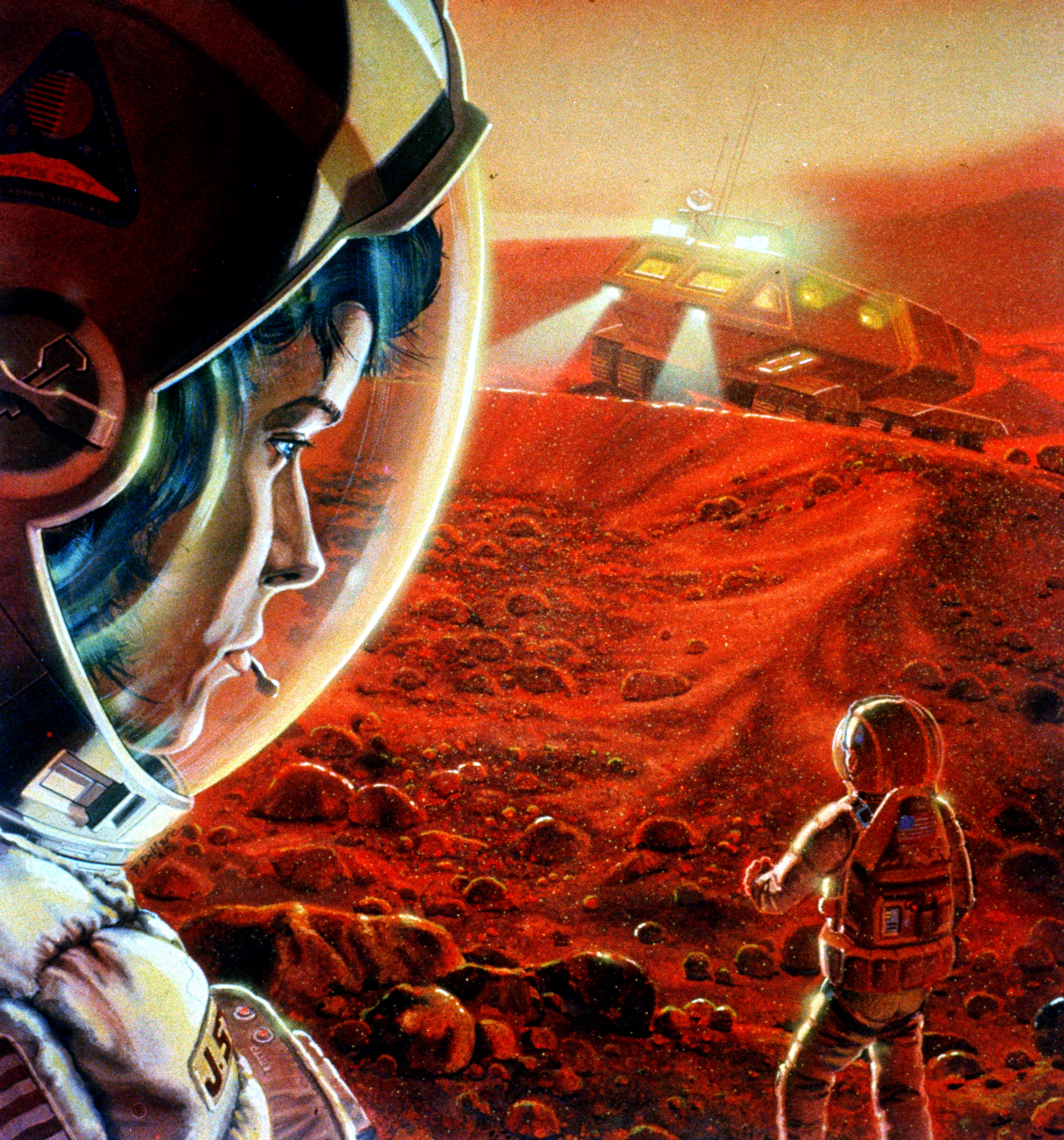
Dust is one concern for Mars missions.

Conditions on the surface of Mars are closer to the conditions on Earth in terms of temperature and sunlight than on any other planet or moon, except for the cloud tops of Venus. However, the surface is not hospitable to humans or most known life forms due to the radiation, greatly reduced air pressure, and an atmosphere with only 0.16% oxygen.

In 2012, it was reported that some lichen and cyanobacteria survived and showed remarkable adaptation capacity for photosynthesis after 34 days in experiments that partially simulated Martian conditions in the Mars Simulation Laboratory maintained by the German Aerospace Center. Some scientists think that cyanobacteria could play a role in the development of self-sustainable crewed outposts on Mars. They propose that cyanobacteria could be used directly for various applications, including the production of food, fuel and oxygen, but also indirectly: products from their culture could support the growth of other organisms, opening the way to a wide range of life-support biological processes based on Martian resources.

Humans have explored parts of Earth that match some conditions on Mars. Based on NASA rover data, temperatures on Mars (at low latitudes) are similar to those in Antarctica. The atmospheric pressure at the highest altitudes reached by piloted balloon ascents (35 km (114,000 feet) in 1961, 38 km in 2012) is similar to that on the surface of Mars. However, the pilots were not exposed to the extremely low pressure, as it would have killed them, but were seated in a pressurized capsule.

Human survival on Mars would require living in artificial Mars habitats with complex life-support systems. One key aspect of this would be water processing systems. Being made mainly of water, a human being would die in a matter of days without it. Even a 5–8% decrease in total body water causes fatigue and dizziness, and with a 10% decrease comes physical and mental impairment (See Dehydration). A person in the UK uses 70–140 litres of water per day on average. Through experience and training, astronauts on the International Space Station (ISS) have shown it is possible to use far less, and that around 70% of what is used can be recycled using the ISS water recovery systems. (For instance, half of all water is used during showers.) Similar systems would be needed on Mars but would need to be much more efficient, since regular robotic deliveries of water to Mars would be prohibitively expensive (the ISS is supplied with water four times per year). Potential access to on-site water (frozen or otherwise) via drilling has been investigated by NASA.

=== Effects on human health ===
Mars presents a hostile environment for human habitation. Different technologies have been developed to assist long-term space exploration and may be adapted for habitation on Mars. The existing record for the longest continuous space flight is 438 days by cosmonaut Valeri Polyakov, and the most accrued time in space is 1,111 days by Oleg Kononenko. The longest time spent outside the protection of the Earth's Van Allen radiation belt is about 12 days for the Apollo 17 Moon landing. This is minor in comparison to the 1100-day journey to Mars and back envisioned by NASA. Scientists have also hypothesized that many different biological functions can be negatively affected by the environment of Mars. Due to higher levels of radiation, there are a multitude of physical side-effects that must be mitigated. In addition, Martian soil contains high levels of toxins which are hazardous to human health.

==== Physical effects ====
The difference in gravity may negatively affect human health by weakening bones and muscles. There is also risk of osteoporosis and cardiovascular problems. Current rotations on the International Space Station put astronauts in zero gravity for six months, a comparable length of time to a one-way trip to Mars. This gives researchers the ability to better understand the physical state that astronauts going to Mars would arrive in. Once on Mars, surface gravity is only 38% of that on Earth. Microgravity affects the cardiovascular, musculoskeletal and neurovestibular (central nervous) systems. The cardiovascular effects are complex. On Earth, blood within the body stays 70% below the heart, but in microgravity this is not the case due to nothing pulling the blood down. This can have several negative effects. Once entering into microgravity, the blood pressure in the lower body and legs is significantly reduced. This causes legs to become weak through loss of muscle and bone mass. Astronauts show signs of a puffy face and chicken legs syndrome. After the first day of reentry back to Earth, blood samples showed a 17% loss of blood plasma, which contributed to a decline of erythropoietin secretion. On the skeletal system which is important to support body posture, long space flight and exposure to microgravity cause demineralization and atrophy of muscles. During re-acclimation, astronauts were observed to have a myriad of symptoms including cold sweats, nausea, vomiting and motion sickness. Returning astronauts also felt disoriented. Once on Mars with its lesser surface gravity (38% percent of Earth's), these health effects would be a serious concern. Upon return to Earth, recovery from bone loss and atrophy is a long process and the effects of microgravity may never fully reverse.

==== Radiation ====
Dangerous amounts of radiation reach Mars's surface despite it being much further from the Sun compared to Earth. Mars has lost its inner dynamo giving it a weaker global magnetosphere than Earth. Combined with a thin atmosphere, this permits a significant amount of ionizing radiation to reach the Martian surface. There are two main types of radiation risks to traveling outside the protection of Earth's atmosphere and magnetosphere: galactic cosmic rays (GCR) and solar energetic particles. Earth's magnetosphere protects from charged particles from the Sun, and the atmosphere protects against uncharged and highly energetic GCRs. There are ways to mitigate solar radiation, but without much of an atmosphere, the only solution to the GCR flux is heavy shielding amounting to roughly 15 centimeters of steel, 1 meter of rock, or 3 meters of water, limiting human colonists to living underground most of the time.

Comparison of radiation doses—includes the amount detected on the trip from Earth to Mars by the RAD on the Mars Science Laboratory (2011–2013).

The Mars Odyssey spacecraft carries an instrument, the Mars Radiation Environment Experiment (MARIE), to measure the radiation. MARIE found that radiation levels in orbit above Mars are 2.5 times higher than at the International Space Station, or much higher than the combined global fallout of the thousands of nuclear weapons tested on Earth. The average daily dose was about 220 μGy (22 mrad)—equivalent to 0.08 Gy per year. A three-year exposure to such levels would exceed the safety limits currently adopted by NASA, and the risk of developing cancer due to radiation exposure after a Mars mission could be two times greater than what scientists previously thought. Occasional solar proton events produce much higher doses, as observed in September 2017, when NASA reported radiation levels on the surface of Mars were temporarily doubled, and were associated with an aurora 25-times brighter than any observed earlier, due to a massive, and unexpected, solar storm. Building living quarters underground (possibly in Martian lava tubes) would significantly lower the colonists' exposure to radiation.

Much remains to be learned about space radiation. In 2003, NASA's Lyndon B. Johnson Space Center opened the NASA Space Radiation Laboratory, at Brookhaven National Laboratory, that employs particle accelerators to simulate space radiation. The facility studies its effects on living organisms, as well as experimenting with shielding techniques. Initially, there was some evidence that this kind of low level, chronic radiation is not as dangerous as once thought; and that radiation hormesis occurs. However, results from a 2006 study indicated that protons from cosmic radiation may cause twice as much serious damage to DNA as previously estimated, exposing astronauts to greater risk of cancer and other diseases. As a result of the higher radiation in the Martian environment, the summary report of the Review of U.S. Human Space Flight Plans Committee released in 2009 reported that "Mars is not an easy place to visit with existing technology and without a substantial investment of resources." NASA is exploring a variety of alternative techniques and technologies such as deflector shields of plasma to protect astronauts and spacecraft from radiation.

==== Psychological effects ====
Due to the communication delays, new protocols need to be developed in order to assess crew members' psychological health. Researchers have developed a Martian simulation called HI-SEAS (Hawaii Space Exploration Analog and Simulation) that places scientists in a simulated Martian laboratory to study the psychological effects of isolation, repetitive tasks, and living in close-quarters with other scientists for up to a year at a time. Computer programs are being developed to assist crews with personal and interpersonal issues in absence of direct communication with professionals on Earth.

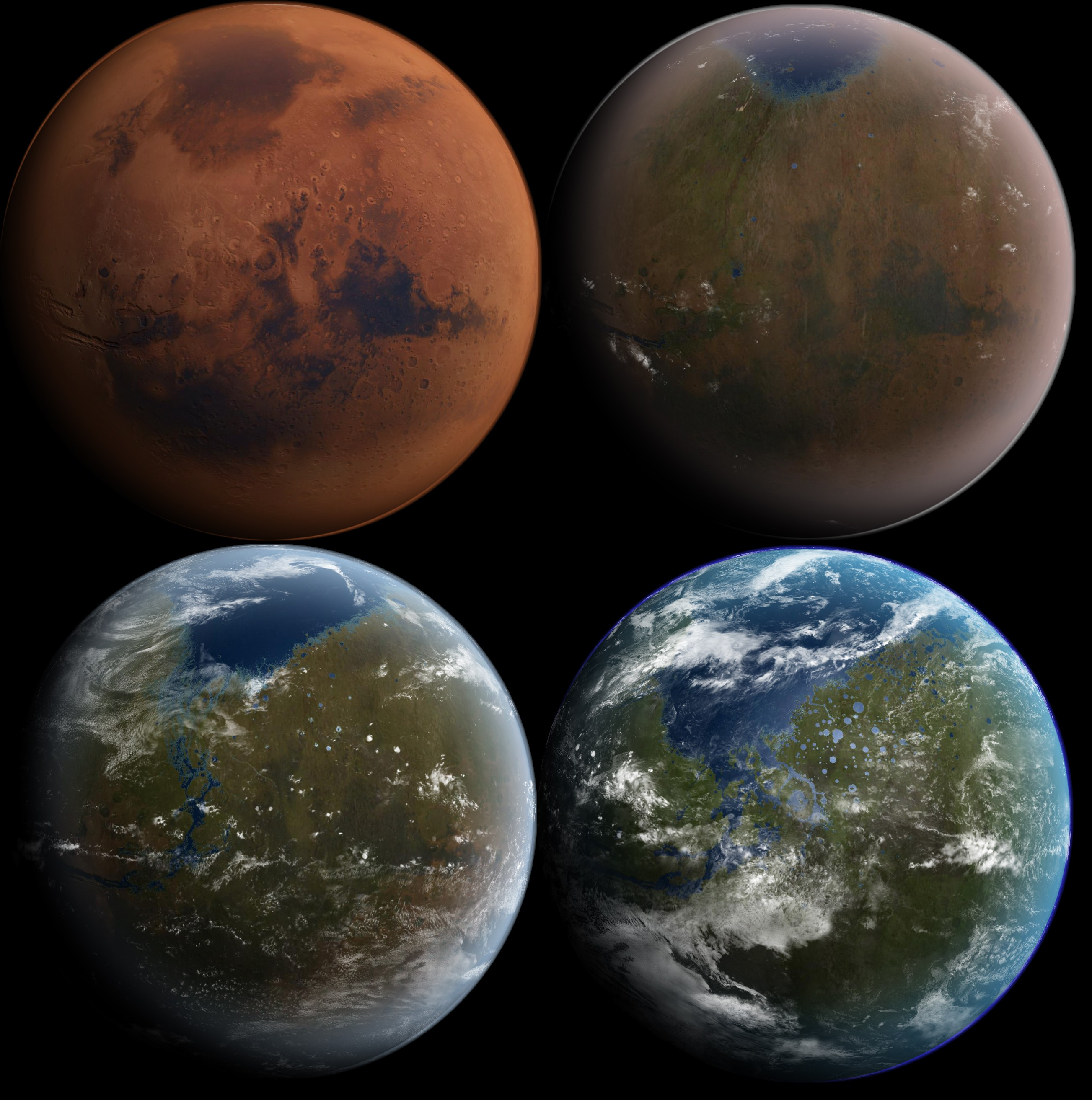
Artist's conception of the process of terraforming Mars as discussed in some works of science fiction

=== Terraforming ===
The terraforming of Mars is the hypothetical set of planetary engineering projects that would modify Mars to allow terrestrial life to survive free of protection or mediation. Proposals for the terraforming of Mars have been put forward, but there is considerable debate about their feasibility and the ethics associated with terraforming.

=== Minimum size of a colony ===
No consensus exists about the minimum viable size of a colony required to ensure that inbreeding would not occur. Through mathematical modelling of the time spent by people on work in a colony, Jean-Marc Salotti concluded that the minimum number for a colony on Mars is 110. This is close to other studies of the genetic problems involved in the longer journey to Proxima Centauri b (6,000+ years). Other studies, focused on interstellar settlement, have concluded that minimum viable populations or a desirable number of colonists range from 198 to as high as 10,000. Recent research integrates institutional portability and societal design, for instance the minimum size of a colony where twelve jurors (none of whom knows the defendant personally) could be recruited in order to hold a fair trial in the colony.

To be self-sustaining, a colony would have to be large enough to provide all the necessary living services. These include:

- Ecosystem management: producing appropriate gases, controlling air composition pressure and temperature, collecting and producing water, growing food and processing organic wastes.
- Energy production: this includes extracting methane for vehicles and, if photovoltaic cells are used to produce energy, this would include the extraction and processing of silicates, to augment or replace any original equipment.
- Industry: extracting and processing appropriate ores, manufacturing tools and other objects; producing clothes, medicine, glass, ceramics, and plastics.
- Building: even if the base is constructed before arrival, it will need frequent adaptation according to the evolution of the settlement as well as inevitable replacement.
- Social activities: this includes raising children and educating them, health care, preparing meals, cleaning, washing, organizing the work and making decisions. Time for sport, culture and entertainment can be minimized but not eliminated.

== Transportation ==
=== Interplanetary spaceflight ===
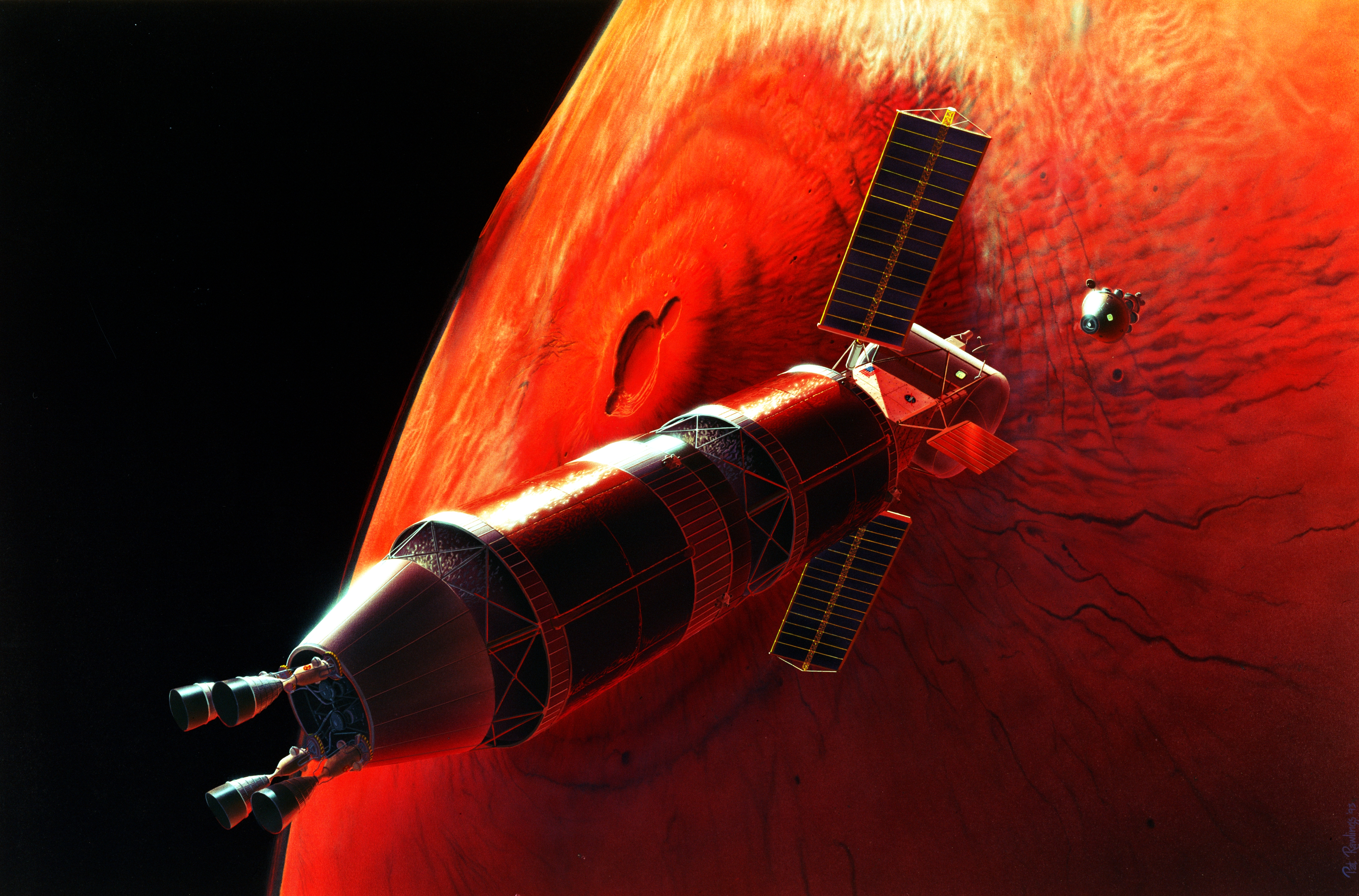
Rendezvous, an interplanetary stage and lander stage come together over Mars (artist conception)

Mars requires less energy per unit mass (delta V) to reach from Earth than any planet except Venus. Using a Hohmann transfer orbit, a trip to Mars requires approximately nine months in space. Modified transfer trajectories that cut the travel time to four to seven months in space are possible with incrementally higher amounts of energy and fuel compared to a Hohmann transfer orbit, and are in standard use for robotic Mars missions. Shortening the travel time below about six months requires higher delta-v and an increasing amount of fuel, and is difficult with chemical rockets. It could be feasible with advanced spacecraft propulsion technologies, some of which have already been tested to varying levels, such as Variable Specific Impulse Magnetoplasma Rocket, and nuclear rockets. In the former case, a trip time of forty days could be attainable, and in the latter, a trip time of about two weeks. In 2016, a University of California, Santa Barbara scientist said it was possible to reduce travel time for a small robotic probe to Mars to "as little as 72 hours" with the use of a laser propelled sail (directed photonic propulsion) system instead of the fuel-based rocket propulsion system.

During the journey, the astronauts would be subject to radiation, which would require a means to protect them. Cosmic radiation and solar wind cause DNA damage, which significantly increases the risk of cancer. The effect of long-term travel in interplanetary space is unknown, but scientists estimate an added risk of between 1% and 19% (one estimate is 3.4%) for males to die of cancer because of the radiation during the journey to Mars and back to Earth. For females the probability is higher due to generally larger glandular tissues.

=== Landing on Mars ===
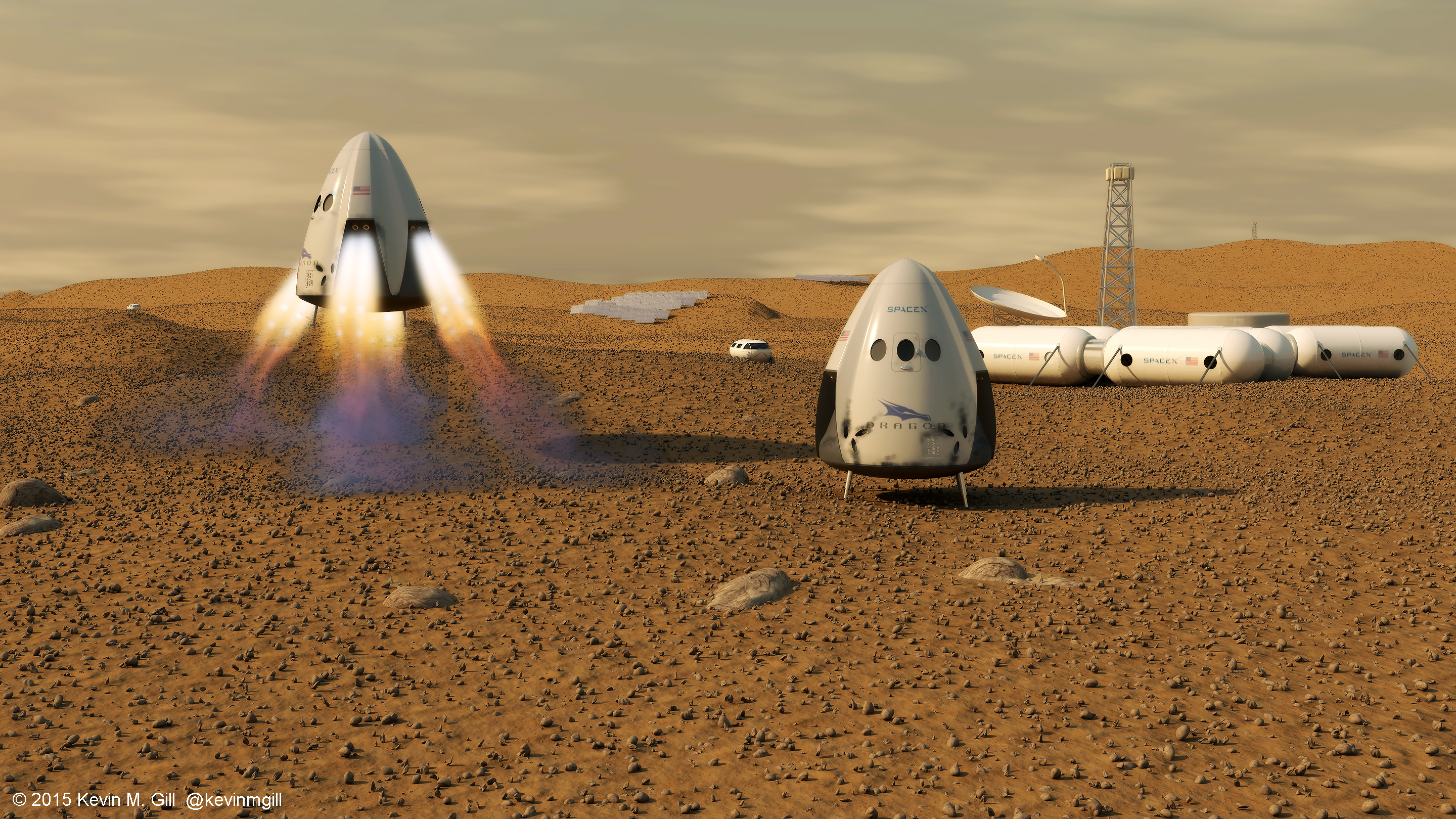
Artist's conception of two Red Dragon capsules on Mars, next to an outpost

Mars has a surface gravity 38% that of Earth, and the density of its atmosphere is about 0.6% of that on Earth. The relatively strong gravity and the presence of aerodynamic effects make it difficult to land heavy, crewed spacecraft with thrusters only, as was done with the Apollo Moon landings, yet the atmosphere is too thin for aerodynamic effects to be of much help in aerobraking and landing a large vehicle. Landing piloted missions on Mars would require braking and landing systems different from anything used to land crewed spacecraft on the Moon or robotic missions on Mars.

If one assumes carbon nanotube construction material will be available with a strength of 130 GPa (19,000,000 psi) then a space elevator could be built to land people and material on Mars. A space elevator on Phobos (a Martian moon) has also been proposed.

==== Phobos as a space elevator for Mars ====
Phobos is synchronously orbiting Mars, where the same face stays facing the planet at ~6,028 km above the Martian surface. A space elevator could extend from Phobos to Mars 6,000 km, about 28 kilometers from the surface, and just out of the atmosphere of Mars. A similar space elevator cable could extend out 6,000 km the opposite direction that would counterbalance Phobos. In total the space elevator would extend out over 12,000 km which would be below Areostationary orbit of Mars (17,032 km). A rocket launch would still be needed to get the rocket and cargo to the beginning of the space elevator 28 km above the surface. The surface of Mars is rotating at 0.25 km/s at the equator and the bottom of the space elevator would be rotating around Mars at 0.77 km/s, so only 0.52 km/s of Delta-v would be needed to get to the space elevator. Phobos orbits at 2.15 km/s and the outer most part of the space elevator would rotate around Mars at 3.52 km/s.

== Equipment needed for colonization ==
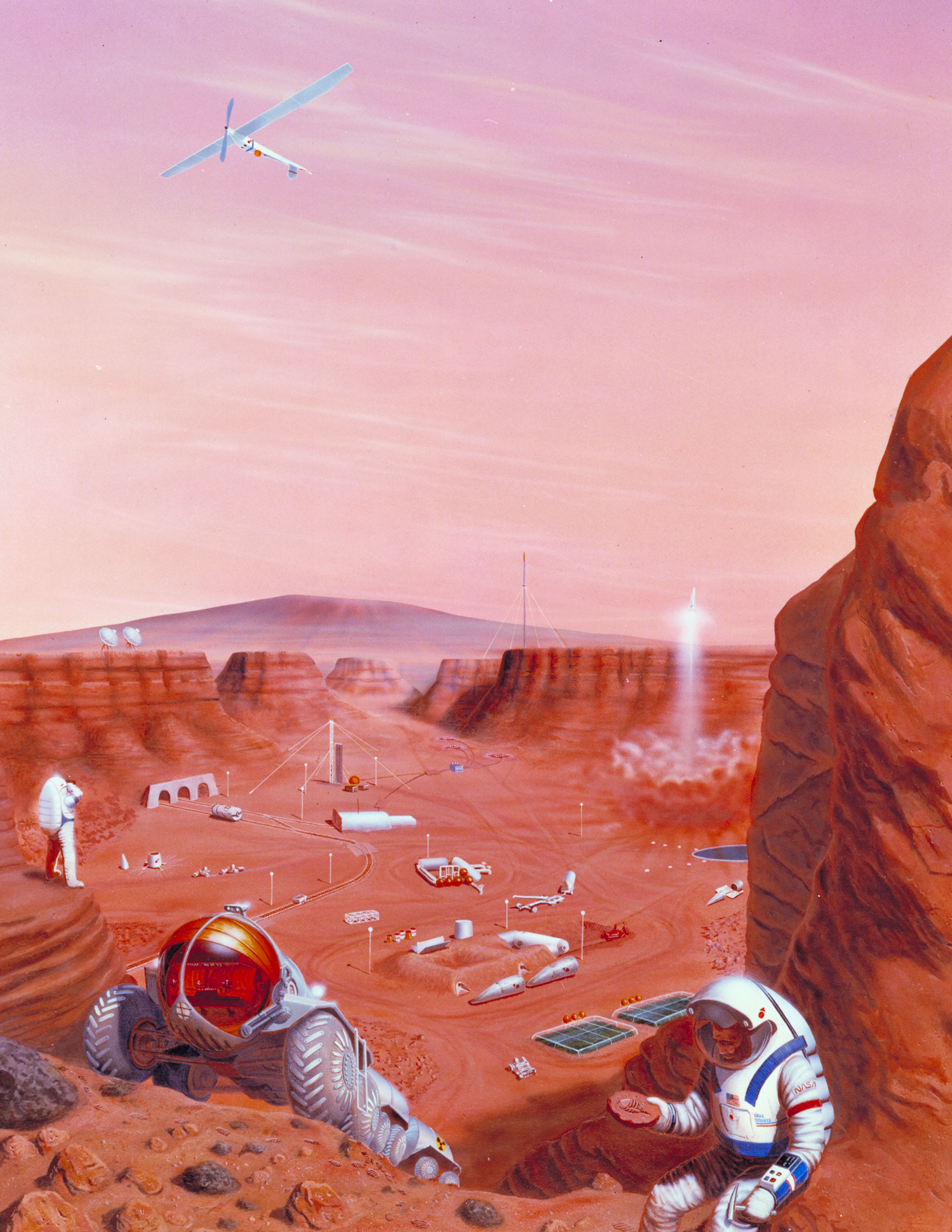
Various technologies and devices for Mars are shown in this conceptual illustration of a Mars base.

Colonization of Mars would require a wide variety of equipment—both equipment to directly provide services to humans and production equipment used to produce food, propellant, water, energy and breathable oxygen—in order to support human colonization efforts. Required equipment will include:

- Basic utilities (oxygen, power, local communications, waste disposal, sanitation and water recycling)
- Habitats
- Storage facilities
- Workspaces
- Airlock, for pressurization and dust management
- Resource extraction equipment—initially for water and oxygen, later for a wider cross section of minerals, building materials, etc.
- Equipment for energy production and energy storage, some solar and perhaps nuclear as well

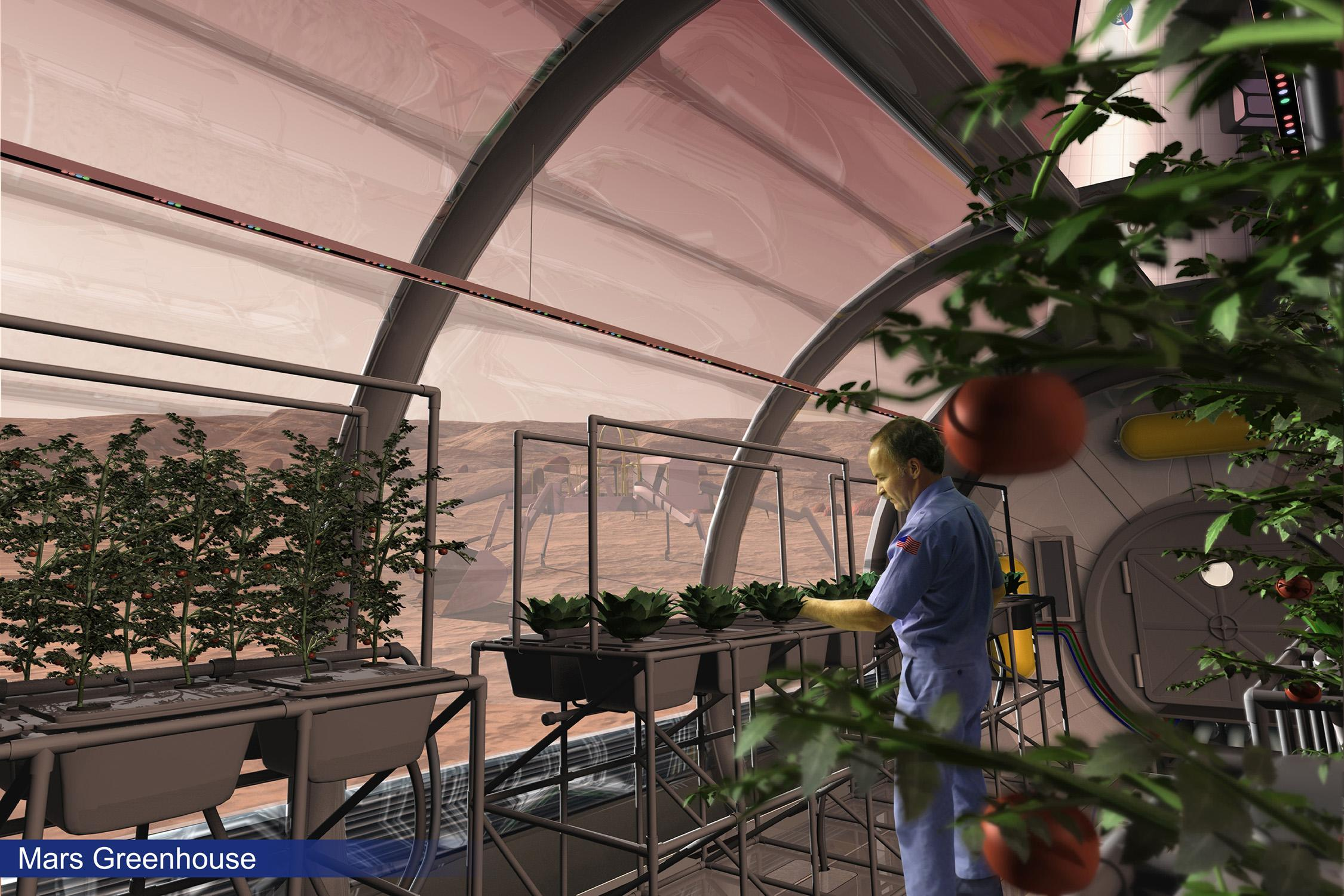
Mars greenhouses feature in many colonization designs, especially for food production and other purposes.

- Food production spaces and equipment
- Propellant production equipment, generally thought to be hydrogen and methane through the Sabatier reaction for fuel—with oxygen oxidizer—for chemical rocket engines
- Fuels or other energy source for use with surface transportation; such as methanol or carbon monoxide/oxygen (CO/O_{2}) engines have been suggested for early surface transportation use as both carbon monoxide and oxygen can be straightforwardly produced by zirconium dioxide electrolysis from the Martian atmosphere without requiring use of any of the Martian water resources to obtain hydrogen
- Off-planet communication equipment
- Equipment for moving over the surface—Mars suit, crewed rovers and possibly Mars aircraft

=== Basic utilities ===
In order to function, the colony would need the basic utilities to support human civilization. These would need to be designed to handle the harsh Martian environment and would either have to be serviceable while wearing an EVA (extra vehicular activity) suit or housed inside a human habitable environment. For example, if electricity generation systems rely on solar power, large energy storage facilities will also be needed to cover the periods when dust storms block out the sun, and automatic dust removal systems may be needed to avoid human exposure to conditions on the surface. If the colony is to scale beyond a few people, systems will also need to maximize use of local resources to reduce the need for resupply from Earth, for example by recycling water and oxygen and being adapted to use any water found on Mars, whatever its form.

=== Communication with Earth ===
Communications with Earth are relatively straightforward during the half-sol when Earth is above the Martian horizon. NASA and ESA included communications relay equipment in several of the Mars orbiters, so Mars already has communications satellites. While these will eventually wear out, additional orbiters with communication relay capability are likely to be launched before any colonization expeditions are mounted.

The one-way communication delay due to the speed of light ranges from about 3 minutes at closest approach (approximated by perihelion of Mars minus aphelion of Earth) to 22 minutes at the largest possible superior conjunction (approximated by aphelion of Mars plus aphelion of Earth). Real-time communication, such as telephone conversations or Internet Relay Chat, between Earth and Mars would be impractical due to the long time lags involved. NASA has found that direct communication can be blocked for about two weeks every synodic period, around the time of superior conjunction when the Sun is directly between Mars and Earth, although the actual duration of the communications blackout varies from mission to mission depending on various factors—such as the amount of link margin designed into the communications system, and the minimum data rate that is acceptable from a mission standpoint. In reality most missions at Mars have had communications blackout periods of the order of a month.

A satellite at the L_{4} or L_{5} Earth–Sun Lagrangian point could serve as a relay during this period to solve the communication blackout problem; even a constellation of communications satellites would be a minor expense in the context of a full colonization program. However, the size and power of the equipment needed for these distances make the L4 and L5 locations unrealistic for relay stations, and the inherent stability of these regions, although beneficial in terms of station-keeping, also attracts dust and asteroids, which could pose a risk. Despite that concern, the STEREO probes passed through the L4 and L5 regions without damage in late 2009.

Recent work by the University of Strathclyde's Advanced Space Concepts Laboratory, in collaboration with the European Space Agency, has suggested an alternative relay architecture based on highly non-Keplerian orbits. These are a special kind of orbit produced when continuous low-thrust propulsion, such as that produced from an ion engine or solar sail, modifies the natural trajectory of a spacecraft. Such an orbit would enable continuous communications during solar conjunction by allowing a relay spacecraft to "hover" above Mars, out of the orbital plane of the two planets. Such a relay avoids the problems of satellites stationed at either L4 or L5 by being significantly closer to the surface of Mars while still maintaining continuous communication between the two planets.

== Robotic precursors ==
The path to a human colony could be prepared by robotic systems such as the Mars Exploration Rovers Spirit, Opportunity, Curiosity and Perseverance. These systems could help locate resources, such as ground water or ice, that would be used by a colony. The lifetimes of these systems would be years and even decades, and as recent developments in commercial spaceflight have shown, it may be that these systems will involve private as well as government ownership. These robotic systems also have a reduced cost compared with early crewed operations, and have less political risk.

Wired systems might lay the groundwork for early crewed landings and bases, by producing various consumables including fuel, oxidizers, water, and construction materials. Establishing power, communications, shelter, heating, and manufacturing basics can begin with robotic systems, if only as a prelude to crewed operations.

Mars Surveyor 2001 Lander MIP (Mars ISPP Precursor) was to demonstrate manufacture of oxygen from the atmosphere of Mars, and test solar cell technologies and methods of mitigating the effect of Martian dust on power systems.

Before any people are transported to Mars on the notional 2020s Mars transportation infrastructure envisioned by SpaceX, a number of robotic cargo missions would be undertaken first in order to transport the requisite equipment, habitats and supplies. Equipment that would be necessary would include "machines to produce fertilizer, methane and oxygen from Mars's atmospheric nitrogen and carbon dioxide and the planet's subsurface water ice" as well as construction materials to build transparent domes for initial agricultural areas.

== Stages ==
In the literature there has been a differentiation of the different stages Mars settlement would encompass:

1. Pre-settlement: small outpost (near-term future)
2. In-settlement: permanent settlement (medium-term future)
3. Post-settlement: self-sufficient society (long-term future)

== Economics ==
=== Economic drivers and prerequisites ===
The rise of reusable launch vehicles in the 2020s has substantially reduced the cost of access to space. With a published price of US$62 million per launch of up to 22,800 kg (50,300 lb) payload to low Earth orbit or 4,020 kg (8,860 lb) to Mars, SpaceX Falcon 9 rockets are already the "cheapest in the industry". SpaceX's reusability includes the Falcon Heavy and future methane-based launch vehicles including the Starship. SpaceX was successful in developing the reusable technology with Falcon 9 and Falcon Heavy and as of April 2024, it was rapidly advancing towards reusability of Starship. This is expected to "have a major impact on the cost of access to space", and change the increasingly competitive market in space launch services.

Alternative funding approaches might include the creation of inducement prizes. For example, the 2004 President's Commission on Implementation of United States Space Exploration Policy suggested that an inducement prize contest should be established, perhaps by government, for the achievement of space colonization. One example provided was offering a prize to the first organization to place humans on the Moon and sustain them for a fixed period before they return to Earth.

=== Local resource extraction and trade with Earth ===
No evidence of abundant resources on Mars with value to Earth has been collected. The distance between Mars and Earth would present a considerable challenge to potential trade between the planets.

=== Local trade ===
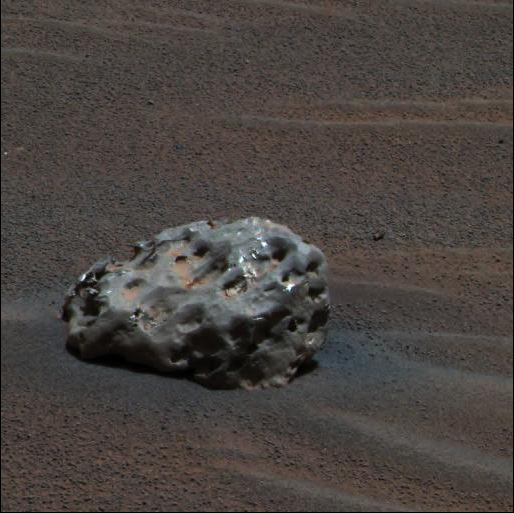
Iron–nickel meteorite found on Mars's surface (Heat Shield Rock)

Some early Mars colonies might specialize in developing local resources for Martian consumption, such as water and/or ice. Local resources can also be used in infrastructure construction. One source of Martian ore currently known to be available is metallic iron in the form of nickel–iron meteorites. Iron in this form is more easily extracted than from the iron oxides that cover the planet.

Another inter-Martian trade good during colonization could be manure, as soil will be very poor for growing plants.

Solar power is a candidate for power for a Martian colony. Solar insolation (the amount of solar radiation that reaches Mars) is about 42% of that on Earth, since Mars is about 52% farther from the Sun and insolation falls off as the square of distance. However, Mars's thin atmosphere would allow almost all of that energy to reach the surface as compared to Earth, where the atmosphere absorbs roughly a quarter of the solar radiation. Sunlight on the surface of Mars would be much like a moderately cloudy day on Earth.

=== Mining and industrial resource use ===
Mining on Mars is usually discussed as part of in-situ resource utilization (ISRU), in which local materials would be processed for use by a settlement rather than exported to Earth. Candidate resources include water ice, atmospheric carbon dioxide, regolith, clay minerals, silica, sulfates, perchlorates, iron oxides, and metallic iron–nickel meteorites. The main economic value of such extraction would be reducing the amount of materiel launched from Earth by producing consumables, building materials, shielding, spare parts, and industrial feedstocks on Mars.

Early resource extraction would likely focus on volatile resources and bulk construction materials. Water ice could be processed into drinking water, oxygen, and hydrogen, while carbon dioxide from the Martian atmosphere could be used to produce oxygen or, in combination with hydrogen, methane fuel. The Mars Oxygen ISRU Experiment (MOXIE) aboard the Perseverance rover demonstrated the production of oxygen from Martian atmospheric carbon dioxide, a technology relevant to both life support and rocket propellant production. Regolith and rock could also be used for radiation shielding, brick, ceramic, glass, and 3D-printed structures.

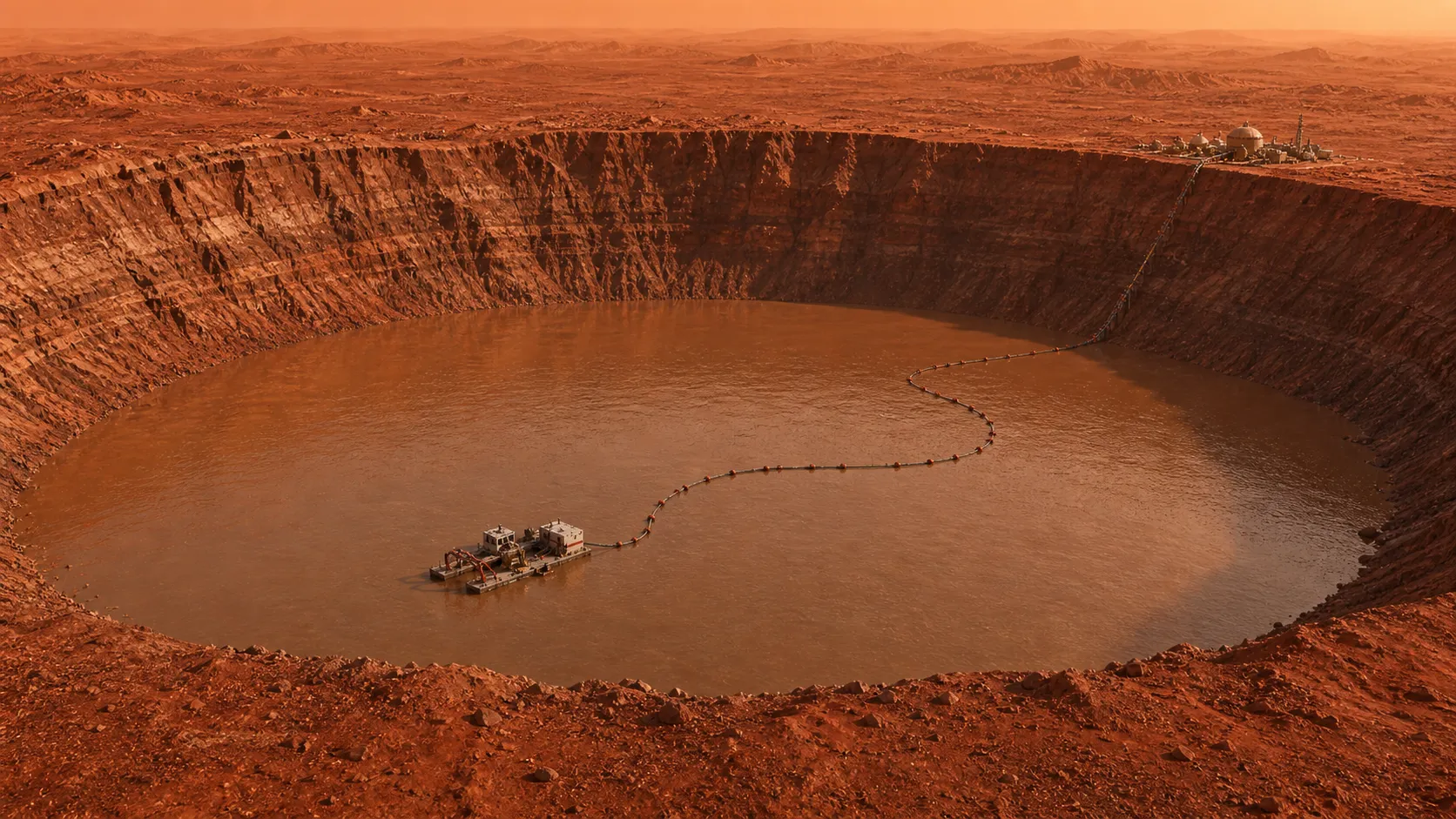
Conceptual design of mining a meteor crater with a floating dredger, on a terraformed Mars.

Metal extraction would be more difficult, but could become important for a larger settlement. Metallic iron in iron–nickel meteorites has been proposed as a relatively accessible source of steel on Mars because it is already present in reduced metallic form, unlike the oxidized iron common in Martian surface materials. More recent assessments have suggested that Mars may contain potentially useful deposits such as nickel–copper–platinum group metal sulfides, copper-bearing deposits, and heavy-mineral sands, although the size, grade, accessibility, and practical recoverability of such deposits remain uncertain. Because many terrestrial ore deposits form through geological processes that are absent or limited on Mars, such as long-term plate tectonics, Martian mining concepts remain speculative and would require further robotic prospecting before large-scale industrial use could be planned.

==== Mining the asteroid belts from Mars ====
Since Mars is much closer to the asteroid belt and has less gravity than Earth, it would take less Delta-v to get to the Asteroid belt and return minerals to Mars. One hypothesis is that the Moons of Mars (Phobos and Deimos) are actually asteroid captures from the Asteroid belt.

16 Psyche in the main belt could have over 10,000 quadrillion dollars' worth of minerals. On October 13, 2023, NASA launched the Psyche orbiter, which is set to reach the asteroid by August 2029.

511 Davida could have $27 quadrillion worth of minerals and resources. Using the moon Phobos to launch spacecraft is energetically favorable and a useful location from which to dispatch missions to main belt asteroids.

Mining the asteroid belt from Mars and its moons could help in the colonization of Mars.

== Possible settlement locations ==
=== Poles ===
It has been proposed to set up a first base at a Martian pole, which would allow access to water.

=== Caves ===
Caves would naturally provide a degree of insulation from Martian hazards for humans on the planet. These hazards include radiation, impactor events, and the wide range in temperatures on the surface.

Mars Odyssey found what appear to be natural caves near the volcano Arsia Mons. It has been speculated that settlers could benefit from the shelter that these or similar structures could provide from radiation and micrometeoroids. Geothermal energy is also suspected in the equatorial regions.

A team of researchers which presented at the Geological Society of America Connects 2022 conference identified some 139 caves worth exploring as potential shelters. Each was within 60 miles (100 km) of a location ideal for use as a landing site and had been imaged in high-resolution by HiRISE.

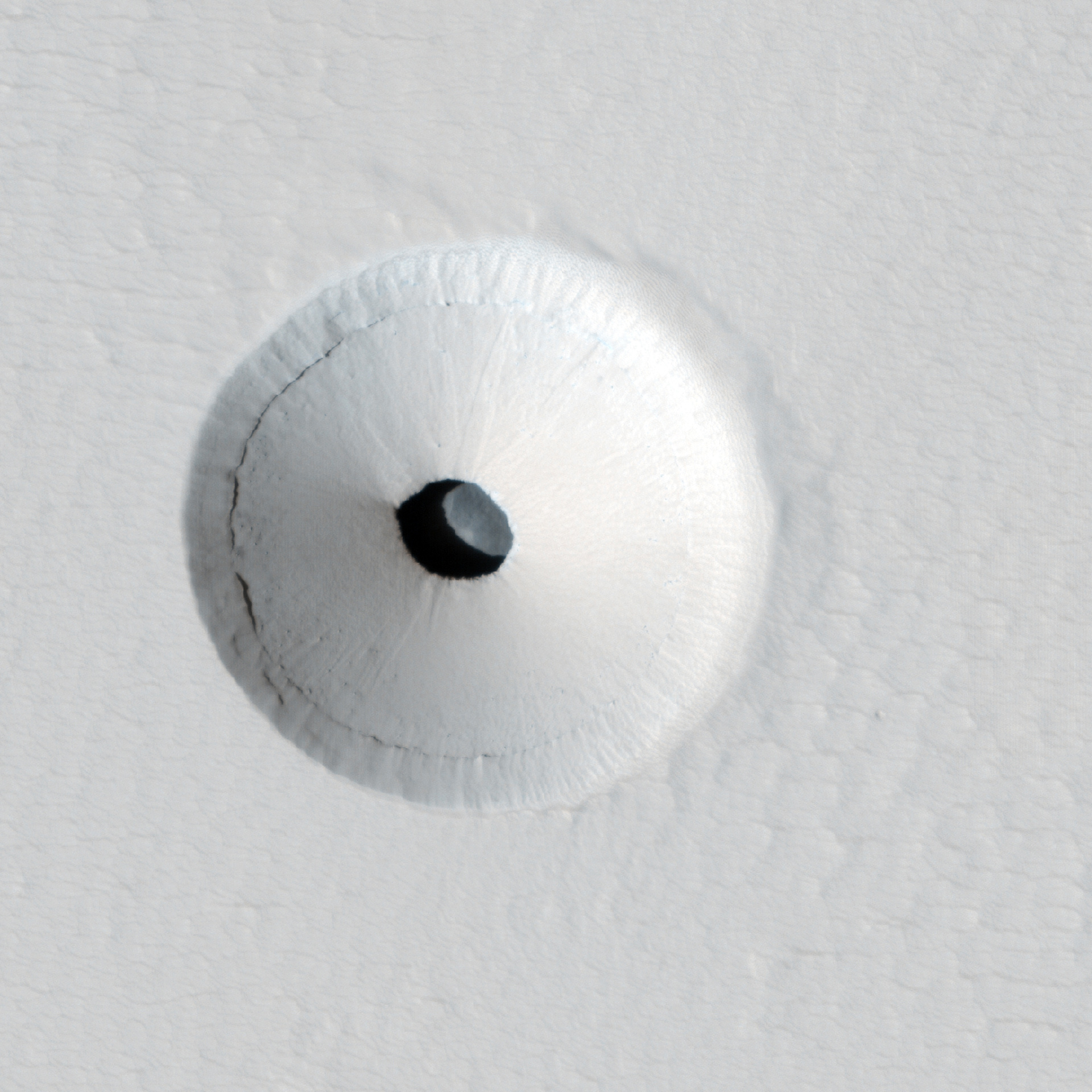
HiRISE image of a lava tube skylight entrance on the Martian volcano Pavonis Mons

=== Lava tubes ===
Several possible Martian lava tube skylights have been located on the flanks of Arsia Mons. Earth based examples indicate that some should have lengthy passages offering complete protection from radiation and be relatively easy to seal using on-site materials, especially in small subsections.

=== Hellas Planitia ===
Hellas Planitia is the lowest lying plain below the Martian geodetic datum. The atmospheric pressure is relatively higher in this place when compared to the rest of Mars.

== Impact of human presence ==
There has been a large amount of discussion about how human presence on Mars would relate to possible indigenous life on Mars. More fundamentally, even the very understanding of human life and in relation to extraterrestrial life, and their different worth has been discussed.

=== Planetary protection ===
Robotic spacecraft to Mars are required to be sterilized, to have at most 300,000 spores on the exterior of the craft—and more thoroughly sterilized if they contact "special regions" containing water, otherwise there is a risk of contaminating not only the life-detection experiments but possibly the planet itself.

It is impossible to sterilize human missions to this level, as humans are host to typically a hundred trillion microorganisms of thousands of species of the human microbiome, and these cannot be removed while preserving the life of the human. Containment seems the only option, but it is a major challenge in the event of a hard landing (i.e. crash). There have been several planetary workshops on this issue, yet no final guidelines have been produced. Human explorers would also be vulnerable to back contamination to Earth if they become carriers of microorganisms should Mars have life.

== Political and legal context ==
In the 1967 United Nations Outer Space Treaty, it was determined that no country may take claim to space or its inhabitants. Many articles of the Outer Space Treaty prevent the legal colonization of outer space.

NASA has dealt with several cuts in funding and changes in focus. George W. Bush favored a return to the Moon. During the presidency of Barack Obama, the objective for NASA to reach Mars was pushed to the background. In 2017, president Donald Trump promised to return humans to the Moon and eventually Mars, and increased the NASA budget by $1.1 billion, to mostly focus on development of the new Space Launch System. In 2025, President Trump proposed reducing NASA's 2026 budget by 23.8% but the US Senate kept funding nearly the same as 2025.

It is unforeseen how the first human landing on Mars will change the current policies regarding the exploration of space and occupancy of celestial bodies. Since the planet Mars offers a challenging environment and dangerous obstacles for humans to overcome, the laws and culture on the planet will most likely be different from those on Earth. With Elon Musk announcing his plans to sponsor travel to Mars, it is uncertain how the dynamic of a private company possibly being the first to put a human on Mars will play out on a national and global scale.

== Ethics ==
It has been argued that settling Mars may divert attention from solving problems on Earth that may also become problems on Mars, with the reasoning that plans about Mars are always about the plans we have for Earth. Jeff Bezos, founder of Blue Origin, a SpaceX competitor in commercial spaceflight, has rejected Mars colonization as a mere "Plan B", suggesting instead to preserve Earth through space development and moving all heavy industrial activity to space.

It has been pointed out that the impact of human settlement on Mars, with regards to planetary protection, a crucial issue in space exploration, has not been comprehensively answered.

It has been argued that there are physical and social consequences that need to be addressed with regards to long-term survival on the surface of Mars. Former President Barack Obama has characterized Mars as more inhospitable than Earth would be "even after a nuclear war", with others pointing out that Earth and underground shelters on Earth could still provide better conditions and protection for more people from apocalyptic scenarios. Mars colonization has been called a 'dangerous delusion' by Lord Martin Rees, a British cosmologist/astrophysicist and the Astronomer Royal of the United Kingdom. Musk has stated that staying on Mars is a life threatening endeavor that needs to be glorious to be worth it. Exploration of Mars has also been argued to be better left to the already successful robotic missions, with crewed missions simply being too expensive, dangerous and boring.

=== Colonialism ===
Space colonization in general has been discussed as a continuation of imperialism and colonialism, especially regarding Mars colonial decision making, reasons for colonial labor and land exploitation have been questioned with postcolonial critique. Seeing the need for inclusive and democratic participation and implementation of any space and Mars exploration, infrastructure, or colonialization, many have called for dramatic sociological reforms and guarantees to prevent racism, sexism, and other forms of prejudice.

The narrative of space exploration as a "New Frontier" has been criticized as an unreflected continuation of settler colonialism and manifest destiny, continuing the narrative of colonial exploration as fundamental to the assumed human nature.

The predominant perspective of territorial colonization in space has been called surfacism, especially comparing advocacy for colonization of Mars opposed to Venus.

=== Dangers during pregnancy ===
One possible ethical challenge that space travelers might face is that of pregnancy during the trip. According to NASA's policies, it is forbidden for members of the crew to engage in sex in space, based on the rationale that crew members should treat each other like coworkers would in a professional environment. A pregnant member on a spacecraft would present additional hazards to herself and all others aboard. The pregnant woman and child would need additional nutrition from the rations aboard, as well as special treatment and care. The pregnancy would impinge on the pregnant crew member's duties and abilities. It is still not fully known how the environment in a spacecraft would affect the development of a child aboard. It is known however that a fetus would be more susceptible to solar radiation in space, which would likely have a negative effect on its cells and genetics. During a long trip to Mars, it is likely that members of a craft may engage in sex due to their stressful and isolated environment.

== Advocacy ==
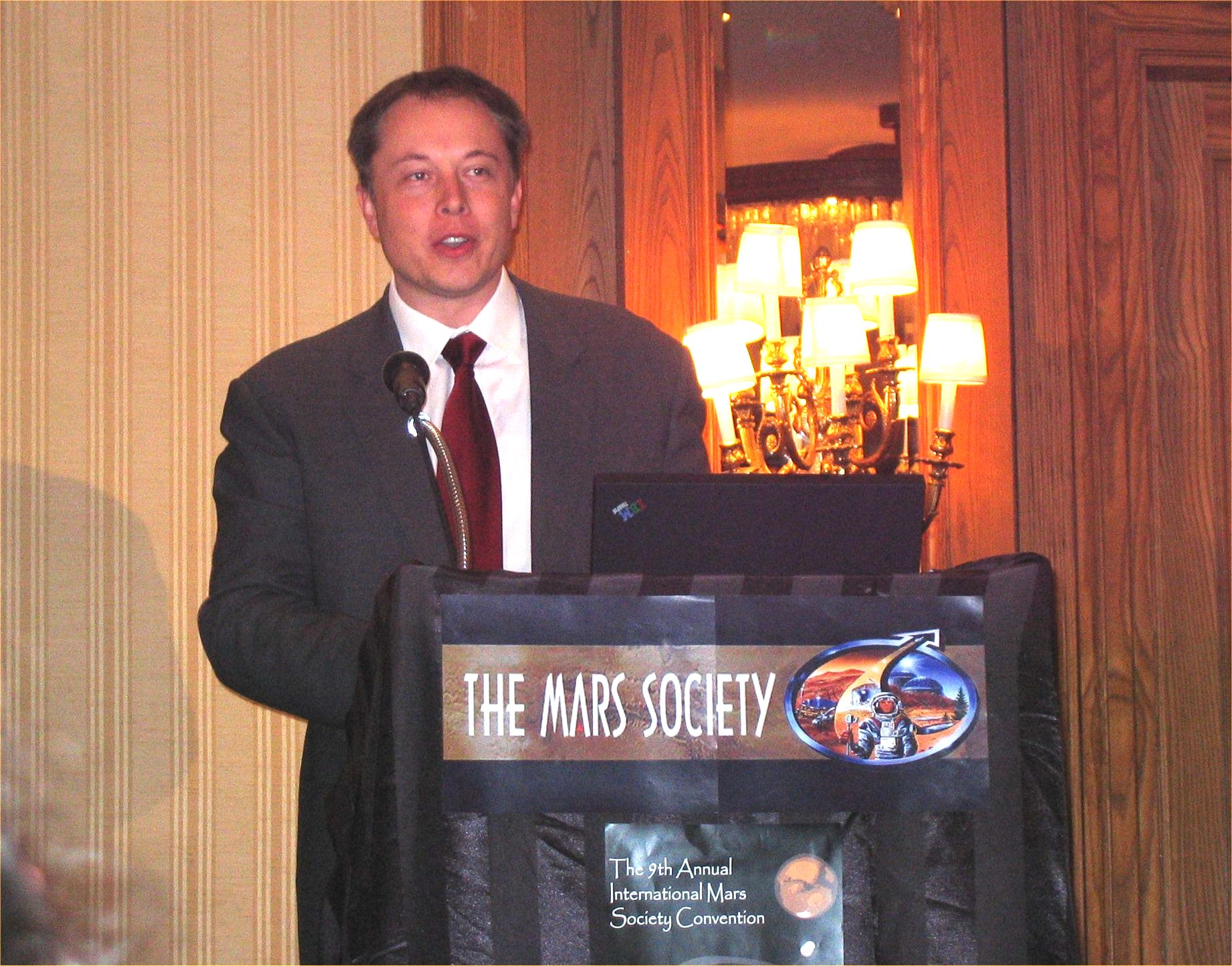
Elon Musk at the 2006 Mars Society conference, who has briefly joined the Mars Society's board of directors. The society and Musk have been longtime advocates of Mars colonization, with Musk having it set as a goal for his spaceflight company SpaceX.

Mars colonization is advocated by several non-governmental groups for a range of reasons and with varied proposals. One of the oldest groups is the Mars Society that promotes a NASA program to accomplish human exploration of Mars and has set up Mars analog research stations in Canada and the United States. Mars to Stay advocates recycling emergency return vehicles into permanent settlements as soon as initial explorers determine permanent habitation is possible.

Elon Musk founded SpaceX with the long-term goal of developing the technologies that will enable a self-sustaining human colony on Mars. Richard Branson, in his lifetime, is "determined to be a part of starting a population on Mars. I think it is absolutely realistic. It will happen... I think over the next 20 years," [from 2012] "we will take literally hundreds of thousands of people to space and that will give us the financial resources to do even bigger things".

Author Robert Zubrin has been a major advocate for Mars exploration and colonization for many years. He is a member of the Mars society and has authored several fiction and nonfiction books about the subject. In 1996 he wrote The Case for Mars: The Plan to Settle the Red Planet and Why We Must. He continues to advocate for Mars and space exploration with his most recent book being The Case for Space: How the Revolution in Spaceflight Opens Up a Future of Limitless Possibility.

In June 2013, Buzz Aldrin, American engineer and former astronaut, and the second person to walk on the Moon, wrote an opinion, published in The New York Times, supporting a human mission to Mars and viewing the Moon "not as a destination but more a point of departure, one that places humankind on a trajectory to homestead Mars and become a two-planet species". In August 2015, Aldrin, in association with the Florida Institute of Technology, presented a "master plan", for NASA consideration, for astronauts, with a "tour of duty of ten years", to colonize Mars before the year 2040.

There are critics of the project of Mars colonization. American political scientist Daniel Deudney has argued that a fully developed Mars colony represents an existential threat to humans remaining on Earth. His book, Dark Skies: Space Expansionism, Planetary Geopolitics, and the Ends of Humanity, challenges the widespread view among advocates that a Mars colony would be friendly to the interests of humans on Earth. According to Deudney, this is merely an assumption based on the largely unexamined claim that a future Mars colony will be a straightforward extension of civilization on Earth, rather than a new kind of civilization with distinct goals, values, fears and desires.

== In fiction ==
A few instances in fiction provide detailed descriptions of Mars colonization. They include:

- Aria (2002–2008), by Kozue Amano
- Away (2020), published by Netflix
- Climbing Olympus (1994), by Kevin J. Anderson
- First Landing (2002), by Robert Zubrin
- For All Mankind (2019), airing originally on Apple TV+, from Series 3 onwards
- Icehenge (1985), the Mars trilogy (Red Mars, Green Mars, Blue Mars, 1992–1996), and The Martians (1999), by Kim Stanley Robinson
- John Carter (2012), by Mark Andrews
- Man Plus (1976), by Frederik Pohl
- The Martian (1992) and Return to Mars (1999), by Ben Bova
- Mars (2016), by National Geographic
- Mars Diaries (2000), by Sigmund Brouwer
- Mars Underground (1997), by William K. Hartmann
- Martian Gothic: Unification (2000), developed by Creative Reality for Microsoft Windows and Coyote Developments for PlayStation, published by TalonSoft for Microsoft Windows and Take-Two Interactive for PlayStation
- Mr. Nobody (2009), by Jaco Van Dormael
- Red Faction (2001), developed by Volition, published by THQ
- Red Planet (1949), by Robert A. Heinlein
- Surviving Mars (2018), developed by Haemimont Games, published by Paradox Interactive
- Terra Formars (2011)
- TerraGenesis (2016), developed by Edgeworks Entertainment, published by Tilting Point
- The Expanse (2016–2021), airing originally on Syfy, then Amazon Prime
- The Martian (2011), by Andy Weir (and the 2015 film, directed by Ridley Scott)
- The Martian Chronicles (1950), by Ray Bradbury
- The Sands of Mars (1951), by Arthur C. Clarke
- The Space Between Us (2016 film), by Peter Chelsom
- Tom and Jerry: Blast Off to Mars (2005), animated science fiction comedy film by Warner Bros. Animation and Turner Entertainment
- Total Recall (1990), by Paul Verhoeven
- We Can Remember It for You Wholesale (1966), by Philip K. Dick

== See also ==
- Astrobotany – Study of plants grown in spacecraft
- Climate of Mars
- Colonization of the asteroid belt – Proposed concepts for the human colonization of the asteroids
- Colonization of the Moon – Settlement on the Moon
- Colonization of Venus – Engineering the global environment of Venus to make it suitable for humans
- Effect of spaceflight on the human body – Medical issues associated with spaceflight
- Exploration of Mars
- Health threat from cosmic rays – Cancer causing exposure to ionizing radiation in spaceflight
- Human mission to Mars – Proposed concepts
- Human outpost – Human habitats located in environments inhospitable for humans
- In situ resource utilization – Astronautical use of materials harvested in outer space
- Inspiration Mars – Defunct, proposed a crewed flyby mission
- Space architecture – Architecture of off-planet habitable structures
- SpaceX Mars transportation infrastructure – Proposed human Mars program by SpaceX
- Life on Mars – Assessments of possible life on Mars
- List of crewed Mars mission plans
- Mars analog habitat – Research simulating the environment on Mars
- Mars Desert Research Station – Longest-running Mars analog habitat
- Mars habitat – Facility where humans could live on Mars
- Mars Outpost
- Mars race – Attempts by various countries to land a human on Mars
- Marsification
- Martian – Depictions of the planet
- Martian soil – Fine regolith found on the surface of Mars
- Vision for Space Exploration – 2004 US human space exploration plan
- NewSpace – Spaceflight not by a government
- Terraforming of Mars – Hypothetical modification of Mars into an Earth-like habitable planet
- The Case for Mars – Robert Zubrin book on potential colonization
- Water on Mars – Study of past and present water on Mars
