= Patrick Reinsborough =

American writer, activist, and social change theorist (born 1972)

Patrick Reinsborough (born 1972) is an American activist, writer, social change theorist and practitioner. He is the co-author of Re:Imagining Change: How to Use Story-based Strategy to Win Campaigns, Build Movements and Change the World (PM Press, 2010/2017) and contributor to social movement anthologies including Globalize Liberation: How to Uproot the System and Build a Better World (City Lights, 2004) and Beautiful Trouble: A Toolbox for Revolution (OR Books, 2012).

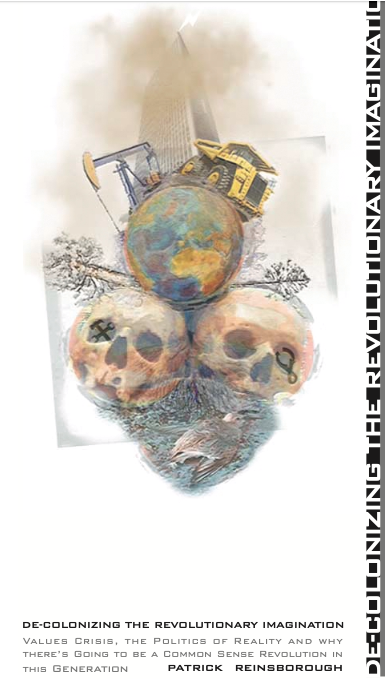
Original 2003 cover of Decolonizing the Revolutionary Imagination zine. It was released under "anti-copyright" and widely republished including in the anthology Globalize Liberation. The essay has been widely reprinted and referenced in various academic analysis as well as pop culture depictions of the era including Jenny Fran Davis's novel Everything Must Go.

== Narrative strategy ==
Reinsborough's writing and political work deals with building transformative movements, shifting cultural narratives and political imagination with a focus on the ecological crisis. He authored the widely circulated essay/zine "Decolonizing the Revolutionary Imagination". He was a founding member of the smartMeme Strategy & Training Project, which began in 2002 training grassroots activists to apply meme theory as a way to shift political debates, amplify social change efforts and "change the story". Reinsborough is one of the creators of story-based strategy methodology and associated with widely used social change frameworks such as "narrative power analysis", "points of intervention,""action logic" and the "battle of the story". He co-founded and was the executive director of the Center for Story-based Strategy.

== Global justice activism ==
Reinsborough was a prominent organizer, trainer and media spokesperson for the U.S. wing of the anti-corporate globalization movement often known as the global justice movement and was involved in mass actions such as the shutdown of the World Trade Organization in 1999 actions against the World Bank and International Monetary Fund, the World Economic Forum and the protests against the Free Trade Area of the Americas Meeting in Miami in 2003.

== Anti-war ==
He has been a public voice against U.S. militarism and called for the American public to engage in mass nonviolent disruption to stop wars. He was an anti-war organizer and media strategist working with the San Francisco-based mobilization Direct Action to Stop the War, which led mass protests against the 2003 U.S. invasion of Iraq. He has publicly supported Iraq Veterans Against the War and also advocated for making connections between opposing war and other issues such as racial and economic justice, corporate power and the climate crisis.

== Environment, climate and Indigenous rights ==
Reinsborough has been associated with a number of campaigns challenging the human rights and ecological impacts of fossil fuels as well as demanding stronger action to address climate change and support Indigenous rights. He helped organize an international solidarity campaign supporting Colombia's indigenous U'wa people, who threatened to commit collective suicide to protest oil drilling on their ancestral territories. Reinsborough has repeatedly cited Mexico's indigenous Zapatista movement as an inspiration for his thinking and political work.

He has supported protests inside the United Nations COP Climate Talks that criticize the failure of the process to address the climate crisis as well as worked to amplify the voices of North American indigenous leaders participating in the UN forum. Reinsborough is a proponent of climate justice specifically advocating for the broader climate movement taking stronger leadership from fossil-fuel impacted communities as a way to accelerate a just transition to a renewable energy future. He has been a strong critic of the Trump administration, calling them "neo-fascist" and pawns of "global petrocapitalism".

== Apocalyptic narratives and COVID ==
Reinsborough's work has often addressed apocalyptic narratives, including coining the phrase "slow-motion apocalypse" to describe public response to the global ecological crisis. During the COVID pandemic in 2020 he did a series of broadcasts sponsored by California Institute of Integral Studies about the role of apocalyptic narratives in shaping political discourse around various structural crises revealed by the pandemic.

== Challenging dominant narratives and promoting systemic change ==
Central to Reinsborough's body of work and public statements is the idea that movements must intervene in dominant narratives in order to change what is considered politically possible. This includes challenging "control myths" that are often used to marginalize efforts at systemic change, such as the idea that "the market will save us" or "technology will save us." He helped create the neologisms Marsification and Marsify to mock space colonization and critique greenwashing "techno-fixes. Reinsborough has called our current economic model a "doomsday economy" and advocated for a strategy of "narrating change" to help build transformative movements.

== See also ==
- List of peace activists
