= Marsification =

Neologism about Mars colonization

Marsification is a neologism that critiques claims that the colonization of Mars is a viable strategy for dealing with the ecological crisis on Earth. The term presents the broader techno-utopian ideology which embraces space colonization as an extension of worldviews such as Manifest Destiny and the logic that drives ecocide.

== Definition ==
The definitions include:

- The various cultural, political and economic processes through which techno-salvationist fantasies divert our attention from the dominant global economic system's erosion of Earth's capacity to support life.
- The expansion of colonial fantasy beyond the atmosphere of the Earth.

It has a verb tense, "marsify", which is defined as:

- Using techno-salvationist fantasy to transcend dire physical and ecological realities on Earth.
- To attempt to solve a problem in the most statistically unlikely and unselfconsciously grandiose way possible.

== Origin ==
Inspired by neologisms that cast light on changing environmental and social conditions and related issues such as solastalgia, the term was created by Zara Zimbardo and Patrick Reinsborough in 2022 in collaboration with participatory art project The Bureau of Linguistical Reality. The Bureau is a public ongoing artwork by interdisciplinary artists Heidi Quante and Alicia Escott, which has received global attention for their work to create new words. to communicate the cultural and psychological impacts of climate change.

== Adoption in popular culture ==
The word first received attention from the BBC in January 2023 in an article exploring new words to adapt to the planet's changing conditions as we enter the Anthropocene. BBC journalist Richard Fisher described marsifcation as the “mistaken attitude that Mars could one day be a refuge from climate change and all of Earth's problems.” Marsification was selected by New Scientist magazine as one of "2023's new words" in science and technology that highlight important parts of our changing society. New Scientist reported that “Marsification captures a fast-developing ideology that presents technological fixes as universally beneficial solutions, while ignoring any tricky social, political, economic or spiritual aspects of complex problems.” The term and definition were cited in Lauren Markham's speculative essay Immemorial.

In May 2024 a concept album audio artwork and interactive website titled Marsification: A tale of planetary grief was released which explores the neologism and critiques “astrocolonial dreams and the nightmares that fuel them.” A track from the album was featured on an episode of U.K. Radio 4’s documentary program Short Cuts, was shortlisted in UK International Radio Drama Festival, and a finalist in Third Coast's Audio Unbound, and featured on Long Live the New Sound and XTMR.
