= Rango (2011 film) =

2011 animated film

- Theatrical release poster
- Directed by: Gore Verbinski
- Written by: John Logan
- Story by: John Logan; Gore Verbinski; James Ward Byrkit
- Produced by: Gore Verbinski; Graham King; John B. Carls
- Starring: Johnny Depp; Isla Fisher; Abigail Breslin; Alfred Molina; Bill Nighy; Harry Dean Stanton; Ray Winstone; Timothy Olyphant
- Cinematography: Rafael E. Sanchez
- Edited by: Craig Wood
- Music by: Hans Zimmer
- Production companies: Nickelodeon Movies; Blind Wink Productions; GK Films
- Distributed by: Paramount Pictures
- Release dates: February 14, 2011 (Westwood, Los Angeles); March 4, 2011 (United States)
- Running time: 107 minutes 114 minutes (extended cut)
- Country: United States
- Language: English
- Budget: $135 million
- Box office: $246 million

Rango is a 2011 American animated Western comedy film directed by Gore Verbinski and written by John Logan. The film stars Johnny Depp as the titular protagonist, with Isla Fisher, Abigail Breslin, Alfred Molina, Bill Nighy, Harry Dean Stanton, Ray Winstone and Timothy Olyphant in supporting roles. It follows the titular character, an anthropomorphic pet chameleon (Depp), as he ends up in the town of Dirt, an outpost in the Mojave Desert that is in desperate need of a new sheriff.

The film contains a number of references to classic Western films, including The Shakiest Gun in the West, A Fistful of Dollars, The Good, the Bad and the Ugly, Once Upon a Time in the West, and Cat Ballou, as well as non-Western films such as Chinatown, Raising Arizona, El Topo and Fear and Loathing in Las Vegas. Visual effects and animation for the film were outsourced to Industrial Light & Magic.

Rango premiered on February 14, 2011, at Westwood, Los Angeles, and was released in the United States on March 4, by Paramount Pictures (under Nickelodeon Movies). The film received positive reviews from critics and grossed $246 million worldwide against a $135 million budget, though its imagery, humor, tone, and subversive themes left some viewers concerned about the film's suitability for younger audiences. At the 84th Academy Awards, Rango won Best Animated Feature. Following its critical and commercial success, Rango would lead to the formation of Paramount Animation.

== Plot ==
A theatrically-minded pet chameleon is left to fend for himself in the Mojave Desert after his vivarium accidentally falls out of his owners' car. The cause of the accident, armadillo hermit Roadkill, was crossing the road in search of a mystical being known as the "Spirit of the West". He tells the chameleon about a nearby American frontier-like town of animals, known as Dirt. Out of options, the chameleon sets out to find the town; after a near-fatal encounter with a vicious red-tailed hawk, he meets desert iguana rancher Beans, who takes him to Dirt.

Asked about his identity, the chameleon presents himself to the townsfolk as a tough drifter named "Rango". He quickly runs afoul of outlaw Bad Bill, who challenges him to a duel. The hawk interrupts it and chases Rango, who accidentally knocks over an empty water tower that crushes the predator to death. Believing he did so intentionally, the townsfolk praise Rango and he is appointed as the new sheriff by the town's elderly tortoise mayor. Some townsfolk worry that, with the hawk dead, infamous gunslinger Rattlesnake Jake will return. As the town is suffering from a severe drought, Beans demands that Rango investigate the lack of water; in doing so, he inadvertently assists mole bandit Balthazar, whom he mistakes for a prospector, to steal the town's remaining water supply. Rango organizes a posse that finds banker Johannes Merrimack III dead from, oddly enough, drowning. The posse tracks Balthazar to his hideout, where they fight his bat-riding clan over the stolen water container, before discovering it to be already empty. Balthazar and his prairie dog sons, Jedidiah and Ezekiel, are taken into custody despite professing that it was like that to begin with.

Realizing something suspicious is going on, Rango begins to question the mayor about how much land he has been buying around town lately to have a modern city constructed upon. Now revealed to be responsible for Merrimack's death, the mayor summons Rattlesnake Jake to expose Rango's lies and run him out of town. Dejected, Rango returns to where he was separated from his owners, crossing the highway amidst the heavy traffic and passing out on the opposite side. The next morning, he encounters the Spirit of the West, appearing as an elderly Man with No Name. He advises Rango to return to Dirt and set things right, asserting that "no man can walk out on his own story".

With the aid of Roadkill and some mystical moving yuccas, Rango discovers that the mayor has been manipulating an emergency shut-off valve in the Las Vegas water pipeline to cause the water shortage in Dirt. Rango returns to Dirt and challenges Jake to a duel, distracting him long enough for the yuccas and Balthazar's clan to instigate the water's restoration. Rango appears to have the upper hand, but the mayor forces him to surrender, detaining him with Beans in the bank's vault to be drowned.

The mayor then attempts to murder Jake with Rango's gun, believing that gunslingers have no place in a modern world. However, Rango had secretly removed its only bullet; he uses it to shatter the vault's glass door, freeing himself and Beans. Impressed, Jake praises Rango's heroism before dragging the mayor away to avenge his betrayal. Dirt's populace then celebrates the return of their water supply and Rango elects to stay on as sheriff.

== Voice cast ==
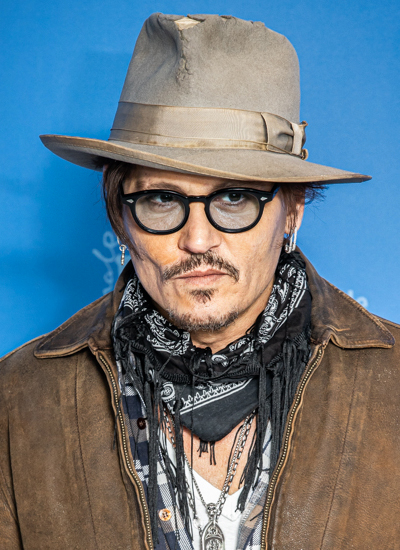
Johnny Depp portrayed the film's titular protagonist.
- Johnny Depp as Rango, an eccentric but well-meaning pet chameleon who becomes the unlikely sheriff of Dirt.
- Isla Fisher as Beans, a hot-headed but virtuous desert iguana rancher and Rango's love interest
- Abigail Breslin as Priscilla, a young cactus mouse with a dark sense of humor
- Ned Beatty as Tortoise John, an elderly desert tortoise who is the mayor of Dirt and plots to enrich himself
- Alfred Molina as Roadkill, an armadillo hermit who is seeking the Spirit of the West
- Bill Nighy as Rattlesnake Jake, a rattlesnake gunslinger
- Harry Dean Stanton as Balthazar, a mole bandit and the father of Jedidiah and Ezekiel
- Stephen Root as:
  - Doc, a one-eared hare who is Dirt's local doctor
  - Johannes Merrimack III, a squirrel who is the banker at Dirt's local bank
  - Mr. Snuggles, a North American porcupine
- Ray Winstone voices Bad Bill, a Gila monster outlaw and the mayor's primary enforcer
- Timothy Olyphant as The Spirit of the West; the likeness of Clint Eastwood is used to represent the character.

Gil Birmingham voices Wounded Bird, a Native American crow who becomes Rango's deputy. Ian Abercrombie voices Ambrose, an owl who joins Rango's posse. Claudia Black voices Angelique, a fox who is the mayor's secretary. Blake Clark voices Buford, a toad who is the town bartender. Ryan Hurst and Vincent Kartheiser voice Jedidiah and Ezekiel, respectively, Balthazar's dimwitted bandit sons. George DelHoyo voices Señor Flan, the leader of a mariachi band of owls who narrate the film; his singing voice is provided by Rick Garcia. Joe Nunez voices Rock-Eye, a cynical desert toad Rango encounters. Alex Manugian voices Spoons, a mouse prospector, James Ward Byrkit voices Waffles, a lizard Dirtonian, John Cothran voices Elgin, a cat Dirtonian and Lew Temple voices Fergus, an eagle-like bird who runs the town general store. Director Gore Verbinski voices Sergeant Turley, a turkey veteran.

Beth Grant, Charles Fleischer, Hemky Madera, Alanna Ubach, Maile Flanagan, Patrika Darbo, Mark "Crash" McCreery, Chris Parson and Kym Whitley appear in minor roles. In addition, Depp, Root, Kartheiser, Byrkit, Darbo, Ubach, Parson and Verbinski all provide additional voices.

The likeness of Benicio del Toro is briefly used to represent his Oscar Zeta Acosta character from Fear and Loathing in Las Vegas in a cameo appearance, alongside Depp as Raoul Duke, reprising his role from the film.

== Production ==
The filming was described as "emotion capture" as the actors shot their scenes in live action for the animators to use as reference. During production, the cast dressed in their character's costumes and performed on real sets in order to "give them the feel of the Wild West". As Johnny Depp could only schedule twenty days to film his scenes, much of the supporting cast had to film with him when it was convenient. Verbinski said his attempt with Rango was to do a "small" film after the first three large-scale Pirates of the Caribbean movies, but that he underestimated how painstaking, time-consuming and expensive animated filmmaking is. Paramount stepped in at the last possible minute as Verbinski's slim financing was about to run out.

Unlike many studio animation projects produced since Avatar, Rango was rendered in 2D, not stereoscopic 3D, as the budget would not allow for it and Verbinski did not want to do "half-assed 3D". Industrial Light & Magic (ILM) turned down Avatar, for which they had done some effects tests, to work on the film as they wanted to work on a less risky project, also taking advantage of their past relationship with Verbinski.

The film contains a number of references to movie Westerns and other films, including The Shakiest Gun in the West, A Fistful of Dollars, Chinatown, The Good, the Bad and the Ugly, Once Upon a Time in the West, Cat Ballou, Raising Arizona, and Fear and Loathing in Las Vegas; as well as references to earlier ILM work including the dogfight in the Death Star trench in Star Wars Episode IV: A New Hope. Verbinski has also cited El Topo as an influence on the film.

In a discussion about the nature of contemporary animated features, Verbinski said in December 2011:

There are shackles with the budgets and the profit margins. You want to compete with what they're doing at Pixar and DreamWorks. There's a price tag with that just in terms of achieving that quality level. What happened to the Ralph Bakshis of the world? We're all sitting here talking about family entertainment. Does animation have to be family entertainment? I think at that cost, yes. There's the bull's-eye you have to hit, but when you miss it by a little bit and you do something interesting, the bull's-eye is going to move. Audiences want something new; they just can't articulate what.

== Release ==
=== Marketing ===
Rango's teaser trailer was released on June 9, 2010, alongside the film's official site RangoMovie.com. It depicted an open desert highway and Mr. Timms, Rango's orange, wind-up plastic fish floating slowly across the road. On June 28, 2010, the first poster was released showing the main character Rango. A two-minute film trailer was released June 29, 2010. Another trailer was released December 14, 2010. A 30-second spot was made specifically to run during Super Bowl XLV on February 6, 2011.

=== Home media ===
The film was released on Blu-ray and DVD on July 15, 2011. The release had been produced as a two-disc Blu-ray, DVD, and "Digital Copy" combo pack with both the theatrical and an extended version of the film, cast and crew commentary, deleted scenes, and featurettes.

The extended version adds a final scene that did not appear in the theatrical release of the film in which the flooded town is now a beach resort renamed Mud and Rango rides out to deal with news that Bad Bill is causing trouble elsewhere and gave his final speech before he falls off his roadrunner steed.

A 4K Ultra HD Blu-ray SteelBook was released on June 4, 2024.

== Reception ==
=== Box office ===
Rango grossed $123 million in the United States and Canada and $122 million internationally, yielding a worldwide total of $246 million. It was the 24th highest-grossing film of 2011.

In the United States and Canada, Rango debuted in 3,917 theaters, grossing $9,608,091 on its first day and $38,079,323 during its opening weekend, ranking number one at the box office. Although the film dropped into second place behind Battle: Los Angeles the following week, it would go on to outgross the opening of Disney's Mars Needs Moms. On March 26, 2011, it became the first film of 2011 to cross the $100 million mark.

In markets outside the United States and Canada, during its first weekend, it earned $16,770,243 in 33 countries. It topped the international box office two times in March 2011. Although the film did not double its budget, it was declared a success by Paramount which subsequently announced the formation of its own animation department.

=== Critical response ===
Rango received critical acclaim upon its release. On the review aggregator website Rotten Tomatoes, 88% of 223 critics' reviews are positive, with an average rating of 7.6/10. The website's consensus reads: "Rango is a smart, giddily creative burst of beautifully animated entertainment, and Johnny Depp gives a colorful vocal performance as a household pet in an unfamiliar world." Metacritic, which uses a weighted average, assigned the film a score of 75 out of 100, based on 35 critics, indicating "generally favorable" reviews. Audiences polled by CinemaScore gave the film an average grade of "C+" on an A+ to F scale.

Richard Corliss of Time applauded the "savvy humor" and called the voice actors "flat-out flawless". He later named it one of the 10 best movies of 2011, saying, "In a strong year for animation ... Rango was the coolest, funniest and dagnab-orneriest of the bunch." Bob Mondello of National Public Radio observed that "Rango's not just a kiddie-flick (though it has enough silly slapstick to qualify as a pretty good one). It's a real movie lover's movie, conceived as a Blazing Saddles-like comic commentary on genre that's as back-lot savvy as it is light in the saddle." Frank Lovece of Film Journal International, noting the nervous but improvising hero's resemblance to the Don Knotts character in The Shakiest Gun in the West, echoed this, saying that "with healthy doses of Carlos Castaneda, Sergio Leone, Chuck Jones and Chinatown ... this [is] the kid-movie equivalent of a Quentin Tarantino picture. There's no gory violence or swearing, of course, but there sure is a film buff's parade of great movie moments." Roger Ebert of the Chicago Sun-Times gave the film four out of four stars calling the film "some kind of a miracle: An animated comedy for smart moviegoers, wonderfully made, great to look at, wickedly satirical ... The movie respects the tradition of painstakingly drawn animated classics, and does interesting things with space and perspective with its wild action sequences."

After praising "the brilliance of its visuals", Joe Morgenstern of The Wall Street Journal wrote, "The narrative isn't really dramatic, ... [but] more like a succession of picturesque notions that might have flowed from DreamWorks or Pixar while their story departments were out to lunch."

In one of the more negative reviews, Michael Phillips of the Chicago Tribune acknowledged its "considerable care and craft" but called it "completely soulless" and that watching it "with a big suburban preview audience was instructive. Not much laughter. Moans and sobs of pre-teen fright whenever Rattlesnake Jake slithered into view, threatening murder."

=== Controversy among parents and audiences ===
Audience reactions were not universally positive, however. While some viewers found the film imaginative and entertaining, others considered its story less engaging or its frightening sequences unsuitable for younger children. Although Rango was marketed as an animated family film and received a PG rating, its humor, Western-style violence, gritty and surreal imagery, existential and spiritual themes, and subversively edgier, dramatic tone prompted discussion among parents about its suitability for young viewers. Some parental reviews considered the film more appropriate for older children and adults, particularly because of its frequent gunfights, threatening characters, mild profanity, smoking and suggestive humor.

=== Smoking controversy ===
The Sacramento, California-based anti-smoking organization Breathe California regards the film a "public health hazard"; it said there were at least 60 instances of smoking in the film. Because of this, some anti-smoking organizations, including Breathe California, petitioned for the film to receive an R rating instead of the original PG rating received by the Motion Picture Association of America. However, no change was made to the smoking scenes and the film maintained its PG rating.

=== Accolades ===
List of awards and nominations
Award	Category	Recipient(s)	Result
Academy Awards	Best Animated Film	Gore Verbinski	Won
Alliance of Women Film Journalists	Best Animated Film		Won
Alliance of Women Film Journalists	Best Animated Female	Isla Fisher	Won
American Cinema Editors	Best Edited Animated Feature Film	Craig Wood	Won
Annie Awards	Best Animated Feature		Won
Annie Awards	Animated Effects in an Animated Production	Chase Cooper	Nominated
Annie Awards	Animated Effects in an Animated Production	Willi Geiger	Nominated
Annie Awards	Character Design in a Feature Production	Mark "Crash" McCreery	Won
Annie Awards	Directing in a Feature Production	Gore Verbinski	Nominated
Annie Awards	Storyboarding in a Feature Production	Delia Gosman	Nominated
Annie Awards	Storyboarding in a Feature Production	Josh Hayes	Nominated
Annie Awards	Writing in a Feature Production	John Logan, Gore Verbinski and James Ward Byrkit	Won
Annie Awards	Editing in a Feature Production	Craig Wood	Won
BAFTA	Best Animated Film	Gore Verbinski	Won
Boston Society of Film Critics Awards	Best Animated Film		Won
Broadcast Film Critics Association Awards	Best Animated Feature		Won
Chicago Film Critics Association Awards	Animated Feature	Gore Verbinski	Won
Golden Globes Awards	Best Animated Feature Film		Nominated
Hollywood Film Festival	Best Animated		Won
IGN Best of 2011	Best Animated Movie		Won
International Film Music Critics Association	Best Original Score for an Animated Feature	Hans Zimmer	Nominated
Kids Choice Awards	Favorite Voice from an Animated Movie	Johnny Depp	Nominated
Los Angeles Film Critics Association Awards	Best Animated Film		Won
Motion Picture Sound Editors	Best Sound Editing in an Animation Feature Film		Nominated
National Board of Review Awards	Best Animated Feature		Won
Online Film Critics Society Awards	Best Animated Feature		Won
People's Choice Awards	Favorite Movie Animated Voice	Johnny Depp	Won
Producers Guild of America Awards	Best Animated Theatrical Motion Pictures	John B. Carls, Gore Verbinski	Nominated
San Francisco Film Critics Circle Awards	Best Animated Feature		Won
Satellite Awards	Motion Picture, Animated or Mixed Media		Nominated
Saturn Awards	Best Animated Film		Nominated
Teen Choice Awards	Choice Movie Animated Voice	Johnny Depp	Won
Toronto Film Critics Association Awards	Best Animated Feature		Nominated
Visual Effects Society	Outstanding Visual Effects in an Animated Feature Motion Picture	Tim Alexander, Hal Hickel, Jacqui Lopez, Katie Lynch	Won
Visual Effects Society	Outstanding Animated Character in an Animated Feature Motion Picture	Frank Gravatt, Kevin Martel, Brian Paik, Steve Walton	Won
Visual Effects Society	Outstanding Created Environment in an Animated Feature Motion Picture	John Bell, Polly Ing, Martin Murphy, Russell Paul	Won
Visual Effects Society	Outstanding Virtual Cinematography in an Animated Feature Motion Picture	Colin Benoit, Philippe Rebours, Nelson Sepulveda, Nick Walker	Won

== Video games ==
Electronic Arts released a video game of the same name which served as a sequel to the film. It is rated E10+ and was released for the PlayStation 3, Xbox 360, Nintendo DS, and Wii.

Funtactix launched Rango: The World, a browser-based virtual world set in the Rango universe, on March 4, 2011, the day of the film's release.

== Soundtrack ==
The score was composed by Verbinski's frequent collaborator, Hans Zimmer and features contributions from songwriter and actor Rick Garcia, Latin rock band Los Lobos, and hardcore punk/industrial band Lard.

Non-original music includes "Finale", composed by Danny Elfman for the 2007 film The Kingdom, as well as excerpts of Richard Wagner's "Ride of the Valkyries", Johann Strauss II's "The Blue Danube", and Hank Williams' cover of "Cool Water".

== See also ==
- Water conflict
- Desertification
- List of films set in Las Vegas
