= Tilting Point =

Mobile games publisher

Tilting Point Media LLC
- Type: Private
- Industry: Video games
- Founded: May 1, 2012; 14 years ago
- Founders: Kevin Segalla; Dan Sherman
- Headquarters: New York, US
- Area served: Worldwide
- Key people: Kevin Segalla (CEO, Founder, Chairman) Samir El Agili (COO, President) Derek Apfel (CFO)
- Products: Full List: § Games
- Number of employees: 460 (2022)
- Website: tiltingpoint.com

Tilting Point is an American video game publisher founded in 2012. In the years since, Tilting Point has grown to include over 200 staff members and office locations in New York, Boston, Barcelona, Kyiv, Seoul, and San Diego. Further partnerships with development studios and publishers exist in over a dozen countries.

The company publishes and manages live F2P games, and in some cases co-develops games with partner studios as well as runs live services for owned games through internal studios. Examples of such titles are: SpongeBob: Krusty Cook-Off, Star Trek Timelines, Warhammer: Chaos & Conquest, Languinis, Narcos: Cartel Wars, TerraGenesis, and Zombieland: AFK Survival.

== Company ==
=== Business Model ===
Tilting Point created a new form of publishing called "Progressive Publishing", which has two main parts. The first is live publishing (which they call "Power Up"), which is a focus on publishing games that are already active. This includes user acquisition funding/management and other publishing services (asset creation, ASO [app store optimization], ad monetization, production management, and live operations). Secondarily is development (or "Team Up"). This includes funding the production of a game and other related services (game design, marketing/PR, IP licensing, and community management). Tilting Point has also been known to acquire independent developers or games.

== History ==
Tilting Point was founded in 2012 by Dan Sherman and Kevin Segalla as Tilting Point Media.

From 2012 to 2015, Tilting Point focused on pay-to-play games.

In 2015 the company hired Samir Agili as Chief Product Officer and Jean-Sebastien Laverge as VP of Growth to transition the company from a pay-to-play games publisher to a free-to-play game publisher.

Following Samir Agili's arrival, the company accelerated its user acquisition expertise and launched its first ever user acquisition fund in November 2016. The fund (initially $12 million), called Game Alliance, was intended for use by independent game developers to scale user acquisition campaigns. This launched a continued effort by the company to assist developers with user acquisition costs. In 2018, Tilting Point expanded its user acquisition fund to $132 million.

2016 also marked the launch of "D.O.R.A." or "Dynamically Optimized Revenue Optimization". DORA is an in-house developed artificial intelligence (AI) that makes predictions about customer lifetime value (LTV). The system uses key performance indicators (KPIs) data to make user acquisition campaign spend amount recommendations.

One of the two original founders, Dan Sherman, left the company in January 2018 and Samir Agili replaced him as president, Chief Operating Officer, and board member.

Tilting Point also developed "C.A.T." or "Creative Automation Technology" 100% in-house in 2018. This system automatically generates static and video advertisements using content supplied to it. This allows user acquisition and marketing managers to run more campaigns across a variety of platforms.

In September 2019, Tilting Point acquired Gondola, a service that leverages machine learning to assist mobile game developers with optimizing in-game economies and rewarded video ads. The company has since been folded into Tilting Point as a whole.

In March 2020, Tilting Point acquired Star Trek Timelines from Disruptor Beam. At the same time, they created Wicked Realm Games with 19 former Disruptor Beam staff members (including former CTO David Cham as the new studio head).

July 2020 marked the purchase of FTX Games and Plamee, including three of their games: Narcos: Cartel Wars, The Walking Dead: Casino Slots, and Criminal Minds: The Mobile Game.

In February 2022, Tilting Point announced it had acquired Korean game developer, AN Games.

== Funding ==
In 2018, Tilting Point made a deal with direct-lending firm Metropolitan Partners Group for a $132 million annual investment. This was used to expand Tilting Point's user acquisition fund.

== Acquisitions ==
Date	Games	Company	New name	Country	Footnotes
Oct 2019		Gondola		USA	
Mar 2020	Star Trek Timelines		Wicked Realm Games (development team)	USA	
Jul 2020	Narcos: Cartel Wars, The Walking Dead: Casino Slots, Criminal Minds: The Mobile Game	FTX Games		USA	
Jul 2020	Narcos: Cartel Wars	Plamee		RU	

== Owned Studios & Offices ==
=== Active studios ===
Name	Description	Date Acquired/ Established	Footnotes
Tilting Point New York		2012	
Tilting Point Barcelona		2018	
Tilting Point Seoul		2019	
Wicked Realm Games (Boston)	Tilting Point acquired Star Trek Timelines from Disruptor Beam and created a new studio to support it.	2020	
FTX Games (San Diego)	Tilting Point acquired FTX Games from Playtech.	2020	
Plamee Studios (Saint Petersburg)	Tilting Point acquired Plamee Studios from Playtech.	2020	
AN Games (Seongnam, KR)	Tilting Point acquired AN Games.	2022	
Budge Studios (Montreal, CA)	Tilting Point acquired Budge Studios.	2022	

== Games ==
Title	Year	Platforms	Developer	Description
Leo's Fortune	2014 (Mobile) 2015 (PC, PS4, Xbox One)	Google Play, App Store, Amazon Appstore, Microsoft Store, Steam, PlayStation 4, Xbox One, Hatch	1337 Game Design, Senri	Award-winning side-scrolling platform available on all mobile devices, PC, PlayStation 4, and Xbox One.
WinFun - New Free Slots Casino	2014	Google Play, App Store	Wizits	Free-to-play casino game featuring slot machines, roulette, blackjack, and poker.
Beat Sports	2015	Apple TV	Harmonix Games	Sports rhythm game from Rock Band creators Harmonix. Features music by Masaya Matsuura, PaRappa the Rapper creator.
Dino Bash	2015	Google Play, App Store	pokoko Studio	Dinosaur-themed tower defense game.
Languinis	2015	Google Play, App Store, Amazon Appstore, Microsoft Store	Tilting Point, VRTRON	The first title to combine spelling and match-three games.
Photo Finish Horse Racing (previously Derby King)	2015	Google Play, App Store	Third Time Games	Initially created by Ian Cummings, who was previously the creative director for the Madden NFL franchise.
Win Vegas: 777 Classic Slots	2015	Google Play, App Store, Microsoft Store	Wizits	Free-to-play casino game featuring slot machines, baccarat, roulette, and blackjack.
Bold Moves	2016	Google Play, App Store	Red Games	Match-three/word solve game launched by OWN Digital (a subsidiary of OWN: Oprah Winfrey Network) that rewards players with quotes from pop-culture icons.
Narcos: Cartel Wars	2016	Google Play, App Store	Plamee	Published by FTX Games and acquired from previous parent company Playtech.
Operation: New Earth	2016	Google Play, App Store, Amazon Appstore, Microsoft Store, Steam, Mac App Store, Samsung Galaxy Store	Hunted Cow Studios	Sci-fi multiplayer strategy game that puts players in command of a military facility in order to defend Earth from alien invaders.
Star Trek Timelines	2016	Google Play, App Store, Amazon Appstore, Microsoft Store, Steam, Samsung Galaxy Store, Huawei AppGallery	Wicked Realm Games, Disruptor Beam (prior to acquisition)	A character-collection role-playing game (CCRPG) based on the Star Trek franchise.
Tap Busters: Bounty Hunters	2016	Google Play, App Store	Metagame Studios	Tapper game with RPG elements featuring artwork by the internationally acclaimed artist Noper.
TerraGenesis	2016	Google Play, App Store, Microsoft Store, Samsung Galaxy Store	Edgeworks Entertainment	An idle planet-building simulator that is based on real data from NASA.
The Arcana	2016	Google Play, App Store	Nix Hydra Games	Visual novel game from the female-founded team at Nix Hydra.
Food Truck Chef	2017	Google Play, App Store, Microsoft Store	Nukebox Studios	Cooking simulator game that was listed in the Top 100 Grossing Charts in more than 100 countries on the App Store and Google Play. It also was the number one Android casual game in 40 countries (including the US).
Adventure Escape Mysteries	2018	Google Play, App Store	Haiku Games	Escape room experiences in mobile game form.
Astrokings	2018	Google Play, App Store	ANGames	Sci-fi MMO strategy game based on the Astronest universe. It was written by Amie Kaufman and Jay Kristoff of The Illuminae Files series.
Reign of Empires (previously Civilization War)	2018	Google Play, App Store	Clegames Inc.	Epic battle tactics RTS game.
Criminal Minds: The Mobile Game	2018	Google Play, App Store	Blue Giraffe Games	Published by FTX Games and acquired from previous parent company Playtech.
Horse Racing Manager	2018	Google Play, App Store, Microsoft Store	Third Time Games	Successor to Photo Finish Racing. Created by Ian Cummings, the previous creative director for the Madden NFL franchise.
Nova Empire: Space Commander	2018	Google Play, App Store	Game Bear Tech	Space strategy game created by Game Bear Tech and published/supported by Tilting Point.
The Walking Dead: Casino Slots	2018	Google Play, App Store	Fox Cub Games	Published by FTX Games and acquired from previous parent company Playtech.
Cat Game	2019	Google Play, App Store	Mino Games	A casual cat collection game
Drone: Shadow Strike 3	2019	Google Play, App Store	Reliance Games	Free-to-play drone reconnaissance simulator.
Warhammer: Chaos & Conquest	2019	Google Play, App Store, Microsoft Store, Steam, Mac App Store	Hunted Cow Studios	A real-time massively multiplayer strategy game set in the Warhammer Fantasy universe.
Zombieland: AFK Survival (previously: Zombieland Double Tapper)	2019	Google Play, App Store	Metagame Studio	An idle role-playing game (RPG) set in the post-apocalyptic world from the Zombieland film franchise.
Match 3D	2020	Google Play, App Store	Loop Games A.S.	3D pair matching game.
Narcos: Idle Cartel	2020	Google Play, App Store	Big Wolf Games	An idle clicker game based on the Netflix show Narcos.
SpongeBob: Krusty Cook-Off	2020	Google Play, App Store, Microsoft Store, Nintendo Switch	Nukebox Studios	Fast-paced cooking game set in the animated world of Nickelodeon's SpongeBob SquarePants
TerraGenesis: Landfall	2022	Google Play, App Store	Edgeworks Entertainment	A city-builder installment of the TerraGenesis series.
SpongeBob Adventures: In a Jam	2023	GooglePlay, App Store	WhaleApp	City-builder styled game set in the animated world of Nickelodeon's SpongeBob SquarePants

== Awards ==
- 2014 Apple Design Award – Leo's Fortune
- 2014 App Store Best of (Runner-up) – Leo's Fortune
- 2014 Global Game Awards – Best Mobile Game (3rd Place) for Leo's Fortune
- 2015 App Store Best of – Beat Sports
- 2019 Apple Best of – Blockbusters Reborn for Warhammer: Chaos & Conquest
- 2020 PocketGamer.biz's Top 50 Mobile Game Makers (Number 27)
- 2020 Google Play Best Pick Up & Play Game Selection for SpongeBob: Krusty Cook-Off
- 2020 Google Play Users' Choice Game Award for SpongeBob: Krusty Cook-Off (USA)

=== Nominations ===
- 2015 International Mobile Gaming Awards Global – Excellence in Gameplay for Leo's Fortune
- 2015 International Mobile Gaming Awards Global – Excellence in Audio Visual Art & Design for Leo's Fortune
- 2017 International Mobile Gaming Awards Global – Star Trek Timelines
- 2018 The Webby Awards – Best Word & Trivia Game for Bold Moves
- 2019 Pocket Gamer – Best Publisher
- 2020 Pocket Gamer – Best LiveOps for Warhammer: Chaos & Conquest
- 2020 Pocket Gamer – Best Publisher
- 2020 Pocket Gamer – Best Marketing Team
