= Alexander Winn =

American writer and producer

Alexander Winn (born September 24, 1986) is an American writer, producer, and director of mobile games, live-action and machinima films. Winn is best known as one of the two founding members of Edgeworks Entertainment, and as the creator of TerraGenesis, one of the top ten science fiction games for mobile in 2020, according to App Annie mobile data and analytics. He is also known as the writer, director, co-producer and composer of the award-winning Halo machinima series The Codex Series, which consists of The Codex, released in 2005, and its prequel, The Heretic, released in 2007. He was a Presidential Scholar at the University of Southern California School of Cinematic Arts, majoring in film and minoring in Classics, and is listed as one of the film school's Notable Alumni.

== Background ==
Winn gained recognition as a young filmmaker while still a senior in high school when two of his student films, Baggage Claim and Jack O'Neill - Private Detective, won a total of 14 film festival awards including a CINE Golden Eagle Award for Jack O'Neill - Private Detective, making him the only high school student in the world to be awarded the CINE Golden Eagle for an individually produced project that year.

== Machinima ==
In late 2004, Winn, along with Ryan Luther, co-founded Edgeworks Entertainment to produce a new Halo 2 machinima series called The Codex. Episode 1 of this series was released on February 9, 2005, a date previously rumored to be the release date of an unknown Bungie project. Winn acted as writer, director, editor and composer, and reprised these roles during production of the prequel series, The Heretic.

Winn and his machinima series have been featured in national and international media including the biography segment "Machinima Master" on mtvU, the front covers of the Dallas Observer and Houston Press, and a full chapter in Halo Effect, a published collection of essays and articles about the impact of the Halo video game series on popular culture. Most recently, he was interviewed as an expert on machinima in a piece for Marketplace on National Public Radio in April 2008.

== TerraGenesis ==
On July 6, 2016, Winn released his 25th app, TerraGenesis, on the iOS App store. Based on real science and data from NASA, the game lets players terraform planets across the Solar System, far-flung systems like TRAPPIST-1, and even journey through time to explore various stages of the Earth's history. As players terraform, they cultivate entire civilizations through emergent gameplay, tackling societal, economical, ecologic, cultural, and political evolution and issues as they work to create habitable worlds for people to live on. Winn always thought someone should make a game based on terraforming and had only spent a month building the game upon the initial release. At the same time, the public's interest in space entertainment was increasing due to the release of Ridley Scott's The Martian starring Matt Damon. Winn was able to create what he calls a "little version" of TerraGenesis in time for the film's opening.

Winn quickly moved on to creating his next app and did not originally think much of TerraGenesis' release. When the app started to pick up, Winn and his wife were actually living in New Zealand at the time and were road tripping around for seven months. Winn says, "She was driving and I was on my little MacBook Air in the passenger seat doing bug fixes, pushing out updates on hotel Wi-Fi and stuff.”

In June 2017, TerraGenesis took the top prize at the Very Big Indie Pitch at Pocket Gamer Connects San Francisco.

On October 4, 2017, Edgeworks signed with publishing company Tilting Point for TerraGenesis, which market and distribute the title on iOS and Android. On April 4, 2018 Edgeworks Entertainment and publisher Tilting Point announced launching TerraGenesis on the Google Play store, making it available for Android users.

In May 2019, the 5.0 version update of TerraGenesis was launched, adding a whole host of new features to the game, as well as a completely revamped graphical engine. Two months later on July 20 a "flat planet mode" was added to the game as well as Moon landing inspired events in the game to celebrate the 50th anniversary of the Moon Landing.

On July 31, 2019, Edgeworks and Tilting Point announced their plans to release TerraGenesis to the Microsoft Store in the fall. To showcase the upcoming Microsoft Store launch, Tilting Point and Edgeworks partnered with filmmaker and composer John D. Boswell on a cinematic video for TerraGenesis, showcasing the possibilities of space exploration, depicting a sense of wonder and curiosity. TerraGenesis currently has over 22 million downloads and is available in 12 different languages.

A city-builder styled game titled TerraGenesis: Landfall released on digital storefronts in 2022.

== Personal life ==
On April 9, 2016, Alexander Winn married Edgeworks cofounder Lacey Hannan.
