= Edgeworks Entertainment =

- Type: Private
- Industry: Entertainment
- Founded: 2004
- Headquarters: Los Angeles
- Key people: Alexander Winn; Lacey Hannan
- Products: The Codex; The Heretic; Vox Populi; TerraGenesis
- Website: www.edgeworksent.com

Edgeworks Entertainment is a machinima and new media production company founded by Alexander Winn and cofounded by Lacey Hannan. The company first gained recognition for their machinima series including The Codex Series, Vox Populi, Forsaken and Radical. Edgeworks is also known for hit terraforming game TerraGenesis, which has over 20 million downloads.

== Productions ==
=== The Codex Series ===
The Codex crew, which then consisted of Alexander Winn, Ryan Luther, Patrick Malone and Meghan Foster, all got together to celebrate the launch of The Codex Series. Lauren Jenks joined the crew after a few months, and the series reached 20 episodes before it ended on August 13, 2005, when Episode 20, "The End of All Things", was released.he Codex Series is the name for the overarching story of the machinima series The Codex and The Heretic. Collectively, the series have received over 80 million hits as of April 2008.

==== The Codex ====
The Codex is a 20-episode online machinima series, set in Bungie' Halo video game universe. Along with its sister series, The Heretic, it is part of the greater Codex Series. It relates the story of a Covenant invasion of a Human world in order to recover a Forerunner artifact, and the story of the Humans resistance of that invasion. Since its initial release on February 9, 2005, The Codex has earned a large international fan base, and has been featured in numerous print, radio, televised, and online news media such as NPR, mtvU, Xbox World 360 Magazine in Britain, and the front covers of the Dallas Observer and Houston Press. In his September 29, 2005 Long Tail blog entry, Chris Anderson, Editor-in-Chief of Wired magazine, described The Codex as the best machinima he had ever seen and an excellent example of his Long Tail theory. The Codex is the highest trafficked peer-produced Halo machinima series in existence, ranking second only to the professionally produced series Red vs. Blue.

==== The Heretic ====
The Heretic is the second machinima series made by Edgeworks Entertainment. Like its predecessor, The Heretic is set in Bungie' Halo video game universe. It is a prequel to the popular series The Codex. The Heretic tells the story of how the Codex was found, and how the various characters in The Codex came to be involved with it. At 12:01 AM, February 9, 2007, Edgeworks Entertainment released Episode 1: Seeds of Doubt.

==== The Reclaimer ====
The Reclaimer was planned to be a sequel to The Codex and also the final series in The Codex Series. However, production of the series has officially been halted until further notice as a result of Microsoft's release of their Game Content Usage Rules, which made certain elements of the series impossible.

=== Vox Populi ===
Vox Populi is the first non-machinima endeavor from Edgeworks Entertainment. It is a community-driven review site, in which registered members can post reviews for, at the time of release, movies and video games. In the following weeks, Edgeworks also added television and book review sections.

=== Forsaken ===
Forsaken logo.

Forsaken was a planned machinima series by Edgeworks Entertainment, and would have been the group's first to be made in the World of Warcraft game engine. According to Edgeworks, the series centered on an "over-the-hill hero" who "must rise to the challenge when the forces of evil begin their bid for control over the land of Azeroth". The series was announced on April 12, 2006, with a teaser trailer and was to be written and directed by Malone and co-produced by Malone and Winn. Forsaken would have been the first Edgeworks production not to be written or directed by Winn, and Edgeworks cited the new series as the first step towards making a community for "artistic development and distribution". Unfortunately, due to the series being rendered impossible thanks to a patch released for World of Warcraft, production of the series has halted as of January 3, 2007, and it seems unlikely that it will ever be completed or released.

=== Radical ===
On 9 February 2010, 5 years after the release of The Codex it was announced that Edgeworks would be creating a new, original, live action web series called Radical. A teaser trailer was released, along with a new forum section and media components. Production was slated to start late spring 2010 with a release date of the first episode also around that time, but was put on hold indefinitely.

== TerraGenesis ==
On July 6, 2016, Winn released his 25th app, TerraGenesis, on the iOS App store. Based on real science and data from NASA, the game lets players terraform planets across the Solar System, far-flung systems like TRAPPIST-1, and even journey through time to explore various stages of the Earth's history. As players terraform, they cultivate entire civilizations through emergent gameplay, tackling societal, economical, ecological, cultural, and political evolution and issues as they work to create habitable worlds for people to live on. Winn always thought someone should make a game based on terraforming and had only spent a month building the game upon the initial release. At the same time, the public's interest in space entertainment was increasing due to the release of Ridley Scott's The Martian starring Matt Damon. Winn was able to create what he calls a “little version” of TerraGenesis in time for the film's opening.

Winn quickly moved on to creating his next app and did not originally think much of TerraGenesis' release. When the app started to pick up, Winn and his wife were actually living in New Zealand at the time and were road tripping around for seven months. Winn says, "She was driving and I was on my little MacBook Air in the passenger seat doing bug fixes, pushing out updates on hotel Wi-Fi and stuff.”

In June 2017, TerraGenesis took the top prize at the Very Big Indie Pitch at Pocket Gamer Connects San Francisco.

On October 4, 2017, Edgeworks signed with publishing company Tilting Point for TerraGenesis, which market and distribute the title on iOS and Android. On April 4, 2018, Edgeworks Entertainment and publisher Tilting Point announced launching TerraGenesis on the Google Play store, making it available for Android users.

In May 2019, the 5.0 version update of TerraGenesis was launched, adding a whole host of new features to the game, as well as a completely revamped graphical engine. Two months later on July 20 a "flat planet mode" was added to the game as well as moon landing inspired events in the game to celebrate the 50th anniversary of the Moon Landing.

On July 31, 2019, Edgeworks and Tilting Point announced their plans to release TerraGenesis to the Microsoft store in the fall. To showcase the upcoming Microsoft Store launch, Tilting Point and Edgeworks partnered with filmmaker and composer John D. Boswell on a cinematic video for TerraGenesis, showcasing the possibilities of space exploration, depicting a sense of wonder and curiosity.

TerraGenesis currently has over 20 million downloads and is available in 12 different languages.
