= FTX Games =

American video game publisher

- Type: Subsidiary
- Industry: Video games
- Founded: 2006; 20 years ago in Israel
- Founder: Yaron Leifenberg; Ilan Graicer
- Headquarters: San Diego, US
- Key people: Casey Dickinson (CEO)
- Products: See § Games
- Parent: Tilting Point Media (2020–present)
- Website: ftxgames.com

FTX Games is an American video game publisher based in San Diego. Originally founded as Funtactix in 2006, the company was acquired by Playtech in March 2016 and was rebranded as FTX Games. In July 2020, FTX Games was acquired by Tilting Point Media.

== History ==
Funtactix was founded in Israel in 2006 by Yaron Leifenberg and Ilan Graicer, backed by Jerusalem Venture Partners (JVP) and Benchmark Capital. Based on an internally developed engine, the company launched Moondo, which enabled players to create and port their character avatar across web-based, online 3D multiplayer games.

In 2009, the company switched to a Flash and HTML5 platform to create IP-based games. This included a partnership with Paramount, to create licensed social games for select IPs, such as Rango: The World or Mission: Impossible - The Game, based on the Rango and Mission: Impossible film franchises, respectively. In partnership with Lions Gate Entertainment, Funtactix announced The Hunger Games Adventures in 2012 based on The Hunger Games film series. The game was released on Facebook (March 23, 2012), iPad (September 2012), and iPhone (February 7, 2013).

By 2016, Funtactix was acquired by Playtech and officially rebranded as FTX Games. In July 2020, FTX Games was acquired by Tilting Point Media.

== Games ==
Title	Year	Platforms	Description
Moondo	2001	PC	A virtual world of online multi-player 3D games, it was one of the first full 3D action games in the browser and the first to introduce the cross-gaming concept of a single avatar used in multiple games.
Rango: The World	2011	PC	Rango: The World was based on the animated film Rango and launched day and date with the movie's theatrical release. Rango: The World was a flash-based Massively multiplayer online game (MMO) aimed at children. This game was one of several planned games as part of a multi-title deal with Paramount to produce virtual worlds and games for selected Paramount brands.
Mission: Impossible - The Game	2011	Facebook	The official social network game for the Mission: Impossible film series was launched on November 21, 2011 shortly before the theatrical release of Mission: Impossible - Ghost Protocol.
New Boyz: The World	2011	Facebook	The official social network game for the hip hop duo The New Boyz was launched on May 2, 2011 shortly before the release of the group's second album Too Cool to Care.
The Hunger Games Adventures	2012	App Store, Google Play, Amazon Appstore, Facebook	The official social network game for The Hunger Games series of films and novels was released in closed beta for fans concurrently with the theatrical release of the film on March 23, 2012. The game was then released to the public a week later on March 30, 2012. The Hunger Games Adventures was then released on iPad on September 13, 2012 and iPhone/iPod Touch on February 7, 2013, with a release on the Kindle Fire on October 18, 2013.
The League: Daily Fantasy Football	2014	App Store, Google Play	The official fantasy football game for The League, The League: Daily Fantasy Football was launched on September 18, 2014.
Power Rangers: UNITE	2015	App Store, Google Play, Amazon Appstore	On January 6, 2015, Funtactix announced a partnership with Saban Brands to create a new mobile card battle game based on the Power Rangers named Power Rangers: UNITE.
Hot Tub Time Machine: Tap That	2015	App Store, Google Play, Amazon Appstore, Facebook	The official mobile game of the Hot Tub Time Machine films, Hot Tub Time Machine: Tap That was announced on December 22, 2014 and then launched on Facebook, Google Play Store and App Store on January 15, 2015
Real Boxing 2: CREED	2015	App Store, Google Play	Developed for Vivid Games, Real Boxing 2: CREED launched as the official mobile game of the movie Creed (film).
Narcos: Cartel Wars	2016	App Store, Google Play	In partnership with Gaumont International Television, Narcos: Cartel Wars, developed by Plamee, is a mobile video game based on the Netflix series Narcos.
Criminal Minds: The Mobile Game	2018	App Store, Google Play	The official mobile game based on the CBS show, Criminal Minds and developed by Netherlands-based developer, Blue Giraffe Games.
The Walking Dead: Casino Slots	2018	App Store, Google Play	The first of two mobile games from FTX Games based on AMC’s The Walking Dead (TV series), The Walking Dead: Casino Slots is developed by Fox Cub.
Breaking Bad: Criminal Elements	2019	App Store, Google Play	Created in collaboration with the creators of the TV show Breaking Bad, Breaking Bad: Criminal Elements was developed by Plamee. According to Breaking Bad show creator, Vince Gilligan, the game is “an authentic extension of the series’ story universe.”

== Awards ==
- 2013 Webby – Best Social Game on Tablet and Other Devices
- 2013 Webby – People’s Voice Award
- 2013 Variety – Best Entertainment IP-based Mobile Game
- 2012 Forbes – Top 10 Tech Company in Israel
