= List of crewed Mars mission plans =

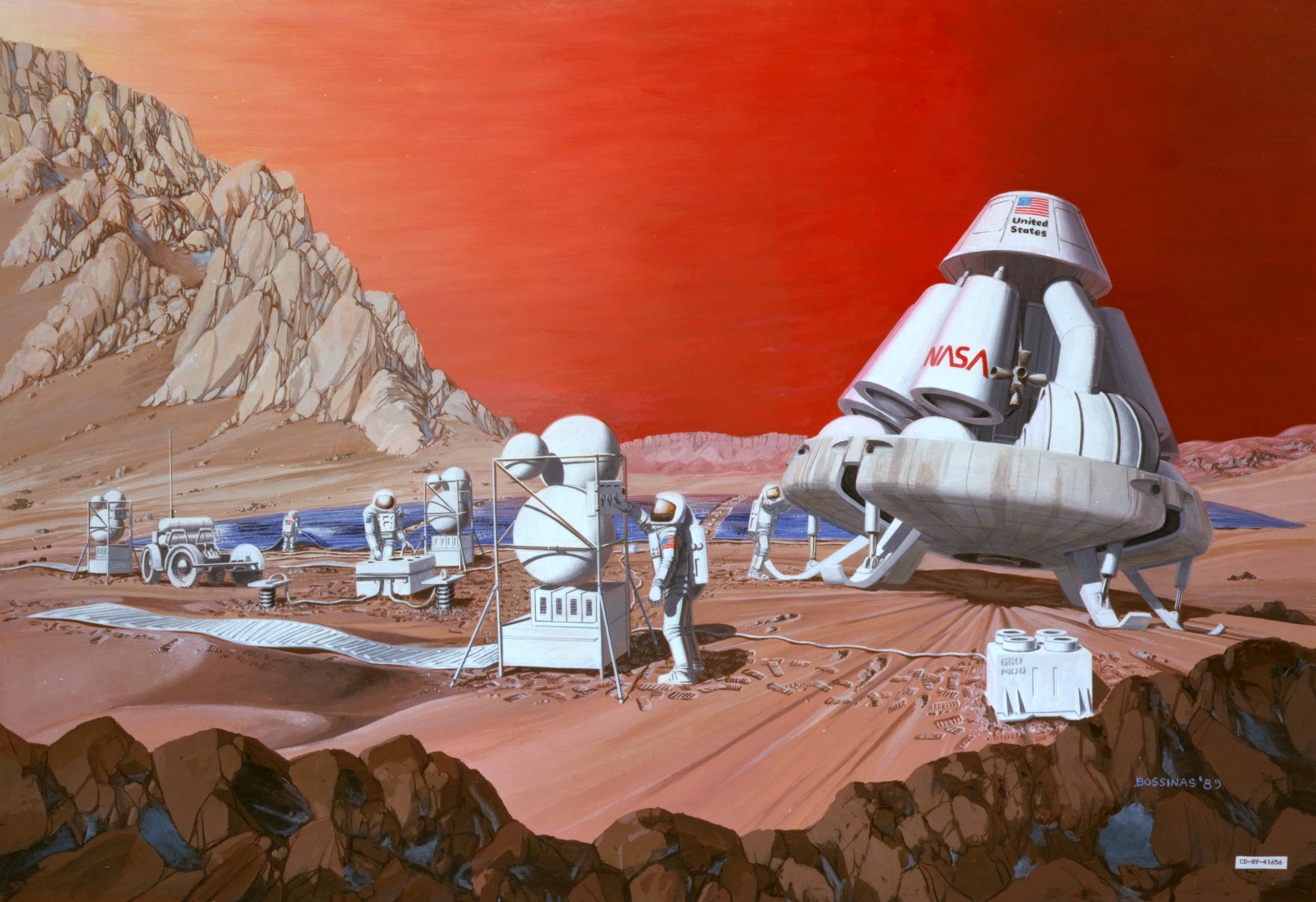
Artist's conception of a human mission on the surface of Mars. 1989 painting by Les Bossinas of NASA's Lewis Research Center.

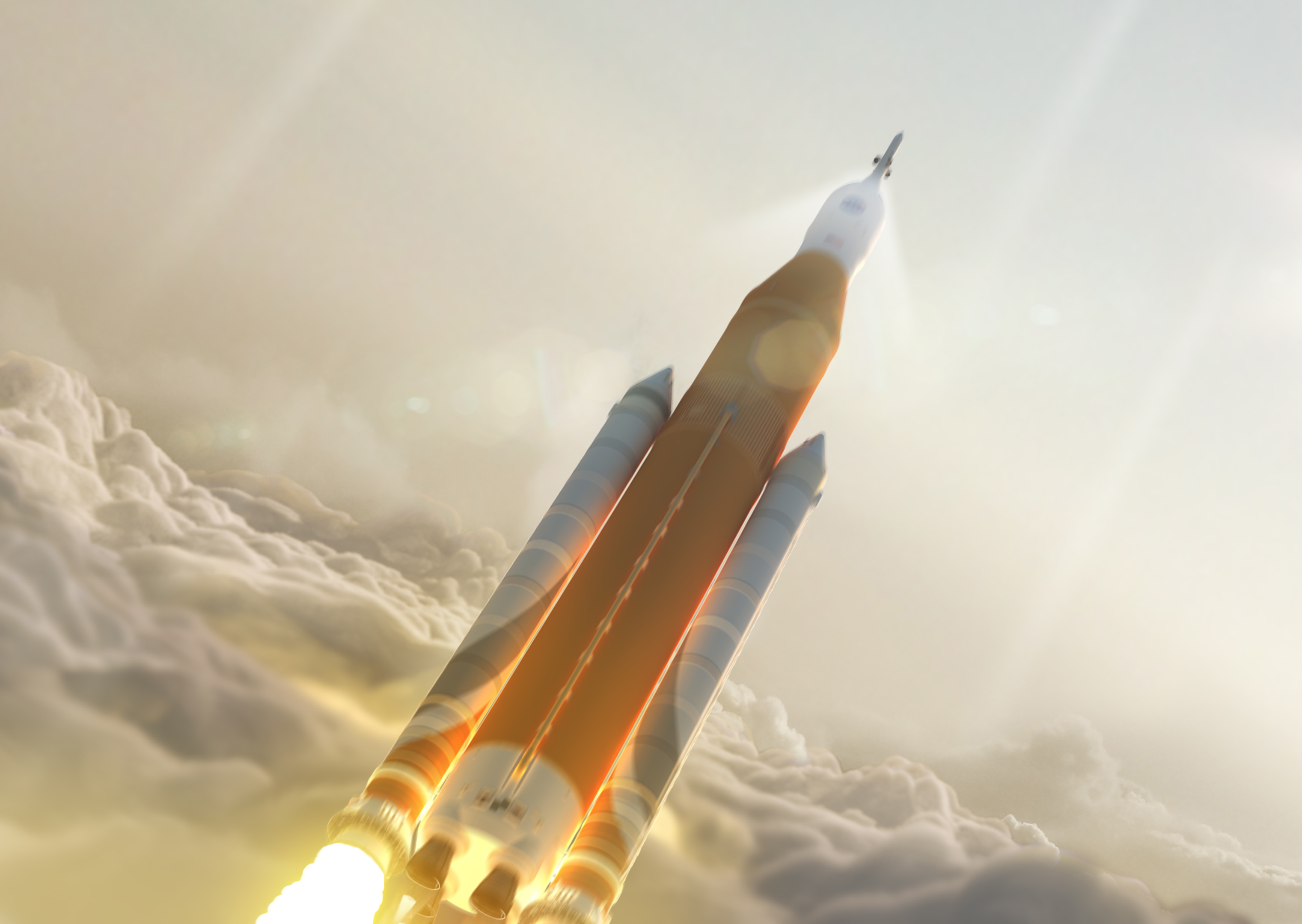
A Space Launch System design in the 2010s. This rocket is envisioned as the launch vehicle for some of the latest NASA speculative long-term plans for Mars concepts.

This list of crewed Mars mission plans is a listing of concept studies for a crewed mission to Mars during the 20th and 21st centuries. It is limited to studies done with engineering and scientific knowledge about the capabilities of current/latest technology then, typically for high-budget space agencies like NASA. Mission profiles include crewed flybys, crewed landers, or other types of Mars system encounter strategies.

== Concepts ==
Many mission concepts for expeditions to Mars have been proposed since the late 20th century, and they have had to take into account Mars' unique properties. The timing of these missions rely on Earth's and Mars' orbits: every 26 Earth months, the Earth-to-Mars transfer energy reaches a minimum, so missions typically coincide with one of these windows Notably, the Mariner 4 Mars flyby in 1965 provided radically more accurate data about the planet: a surface atmospheric pressure of about 1% of Earth's and daytime temperatures of −100 degrees Celsius (−148 degrees Fahrenheit) were estimated. No significant magnetic field or Martian radiation belts were detected. The new data meant redesigns for planned Martian landers, and showed life would have a more difficult time surviving there than previously anticipated. Later NASA probes in the 1970s, 1980s, and 1990s confirmed the findings about Mars environmental conditions.

The first engineering analysis of a crewed mission to Mars was made by Wernher von Braun in 1948. It was originally published as Das Marsprojekt in West Germany in 1952, and as The Mars Project in English in the United States in 1953. Von Braun's Mars "flotilla" included ten 4,000-ton ships with 70 crew members. The expected launch year was 1965.

== List ==
The list is in semi-chronological order, with some groupings, as variation can exist in the dating of a given plan. Various references were consulted. LEO mass refers to how much hardware must be put in low Earth orbit for the mission. For comparison, the low Earth orbit payload capacity per launch of the U.S. Space Shuttle is about 25 metric tons, and that of the Saturn V, 120 metric tons.

Name	Crew	LEO mass (metric tons)	Year announced	Suggested launch year	Ref.
Von Braun Mars 1952 (Das Marsprojekt)	70	37,200	1952	1965	
Stuhlinger Mars 1954–1957	20	660	1954	1980	
Von Braun Mars 1956 (The Exploration of Mars)	12	3,400	1956	1970	
Martian Piloted Complex 1958–1962	6	1,630	1958	1975	
TMK-1 1959 (flyby)	3	75	1959	1971	
Bono Mars 1960	8	800	1960	1971	
NASA Lewis Mars 1960	6	614	1960	1971	
TMK-2 (TMK-E)	2	75	1960	1971	
EMPIRE Aeronutronic 1962	6	227	1962	1970	
Stuhlinger Mars 1962	15	1,800	1962	1975	
EMPIRE General Dynamics 1962	8	900	1962	1975	
EMPIRE Lockheed 1962	3	100	1962	1974	
Faget Mars (chemical) 1963	6	1,140	1963		
Faget Mars (nuclear) 1963	6	270	1963		
TRW Mars Expedition 1963	6	650	1963	1975	
UMPIRE Douglas 1964	6	450	1964	1975	
Project Deimos	6	3,965	1964	1986	
Douglas MORL Mars Flyby 1965	3	360	1965	1973	
NASA JAG Manned Mars Flyby 1966	4		1966	1975	
NASA NERVA-Electric Mars 1966	5	1,552	1966	1986	
Korolev KK (TMK) 1966	3	150	1966	1980	
Titus FLEM 1966	3	118	1966	1985	
Stuhlinger Mars 1966		2,788	1966		
Boeing IMIS 1968	6	1,226	1968	1985	
Mars Expeditionary Complex (MEK) 1969	3	150	1969	1980	
Von Braun Mars 1969	12	1,455	1969	1981	
NASA Mars Expedition 1971	6	1,900	1971	1987	
Mars in 30 Days (Ragsdale 1972)	5	2,041	1972		
MK-700 1972	2	1,400	1972	1980	
Chelomei 1975 (MK-700 flyby)	2	250	1975	1980	
British Interplanetary Society Mars 1982	8	1,300	1982		
Planetary Society Mars Expedition 1983	4	160	1983	2003	
Case for Mars II 1984	30	1,900	1984	2007	
NASA-LANL Manned Mars Flyby 1985		350	1985		
Paine 1986 (Pioneering the Space Frontier)			1986	2026	
NPO Energia Mars 1986	4	365	1986	2000	
NASA Ride Report 1987	6	210	1987	2004	
NASA Mars Evolution 1988	8	330	1988	2013	
NASA Mars Expedition 1988	8	1,628	1988	2007	
NASA Phobos Expedition 1988	4	765	1988	2003	
NASA 90 Day Study 1989	4	980 – 1,300	1989	2017	
NPO Energia Mars 1989	4	355	1989	2001	
Mars Evolution 1989	5		1989	2007	
NASA Mars Expedition 1989	3	780	1989	2004	
Mars Direct (Zubrin 1991)	4	220	1991	1997	
STCAEM CAB 1991	4	800	1991	2016	
STCAEM NEP 1991	4	500	1991	2016	
STCAEM NTR 1991	4	800	1991	2016	
STCAEM SEP 1991	4	410	1991	2016	
NASA Synthesis Study 1991	6	1,080	1991	2014	
International Space University 1991	8		1991	2016	
NASA Design Reference Mission 1.0 1993	6	900	1993	2007	
Kurchatov Mars 1994	5	800	1994	2010	
Zubrin Athena (flyby)	2	100	1996	2001	
NASA Design Reference Mission 3 1997	6	410	1997	2011	
NASA Mars Combo Lander 1998	4	280	1998	2011	
NASA Design Reference Mission 4 1998	6	400	1998	2011	
NASA Dual Lander Mission	12	600	1999	2011	
Mars Society Mission 1999	10	900	1999	2011	
Marpost (Gorshkov 2000)	6	400	2000	2017	
Boeing Mars Transfer Vehicle & Lander Concepts for Human Exploration Missions in the 2031–2038 Time Frame (2006)	6	100	2006	2038	
Mars Design Reference Mission 5	18		2009	2035	
SpaceX Starship		100	2012	2026	
Inspiration Mars (Tito 2013)	2		2013	2021	

== Mission proposals ==
=== 20th century ===
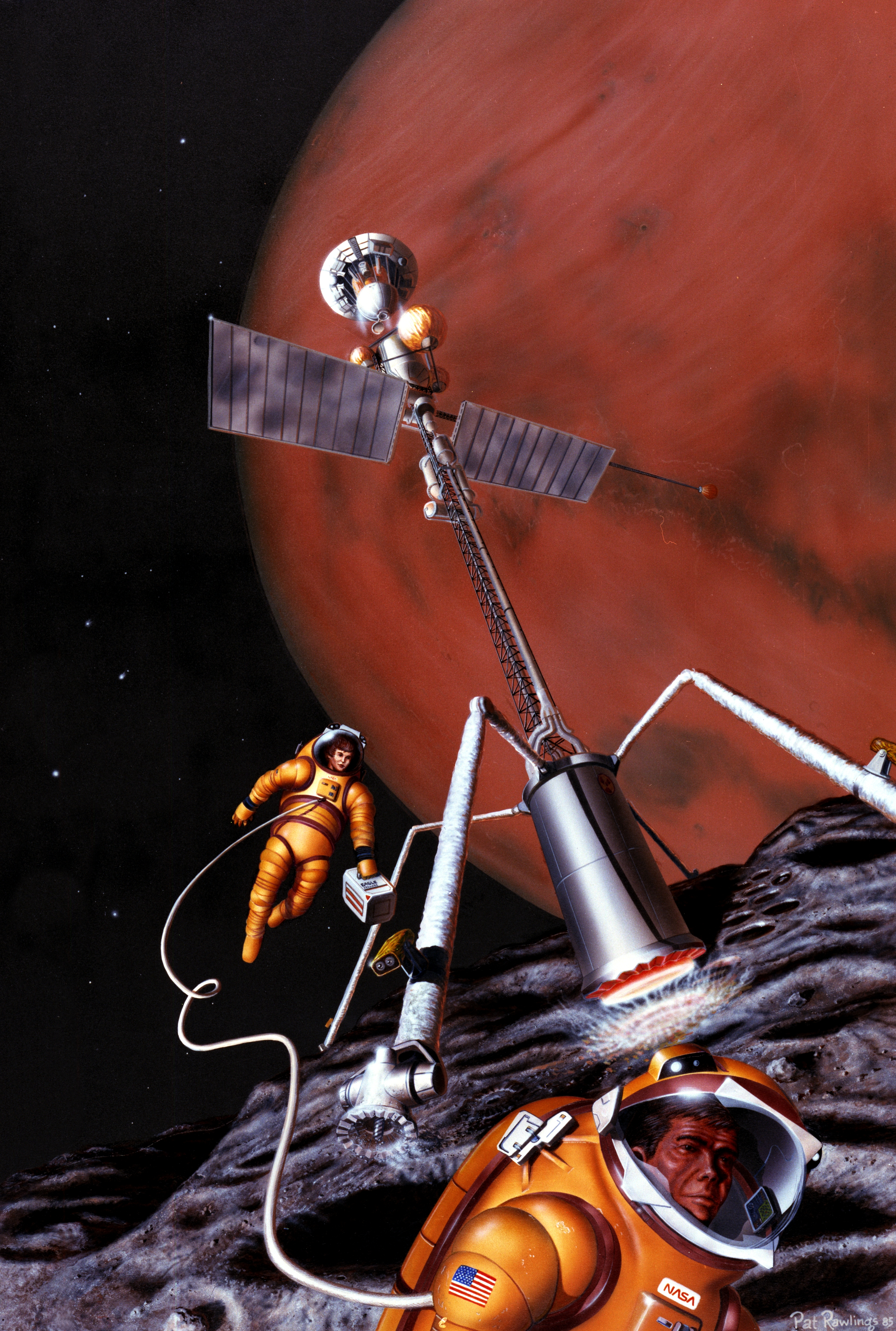
Fuel is mined from Phobos with the help of a nuclear reactor.

Over the last century, a number of mission concepts for such an expedition have been proposed. David Portree's history volume Humans to Mars: Fifty Years of Mission Planning, 1950–2000 discusses many of these.

==== Wernher von Braun proposal (1947 through 1950s) ====
Wernher von Braun was the first person to make a detailed technical study of a Mars mission. Details were published in his book Das Marsprojekt (1952, published in English as The Mars Project in 1962) and several subsequent works. Willy Ley popularized a similar mission in English in the book The Conquest of Space (1949), featuring illustrations by Chesley Bonestell. Von Braun's Mars project envisioned nearly a thousand three-stage vehicles launching from Earth to ferry parts for the Mars mission to be constructed at a space station in Earth orbit. The mission itself featured a fleet of ten spacecraft with a combined crew of 70 heading to Mars, bringing three winged surface excursion ships that would land horizontally on the surface of Mars. (Winged landing was considered possible because at the time of his proposal, the Martian atmosphere was believed to be much denser than was later found to be the case.)

In the 1956 revised vision of the Mars Project plan, published in the book The Exploration of Mars by Wernher Von Braun and Willy Ley, the size of the mission was trimmed, requiring only 400 launches to put together two ships, still carrying a winged landing vehicle. Later versions of the mission proposal, featured in the Disney "Man In Space" film series, showed nuclear-powered ion-propulsion vehicles for the interplanetary cruise.

==== U.S. proposals (1950s to 1970s) ====
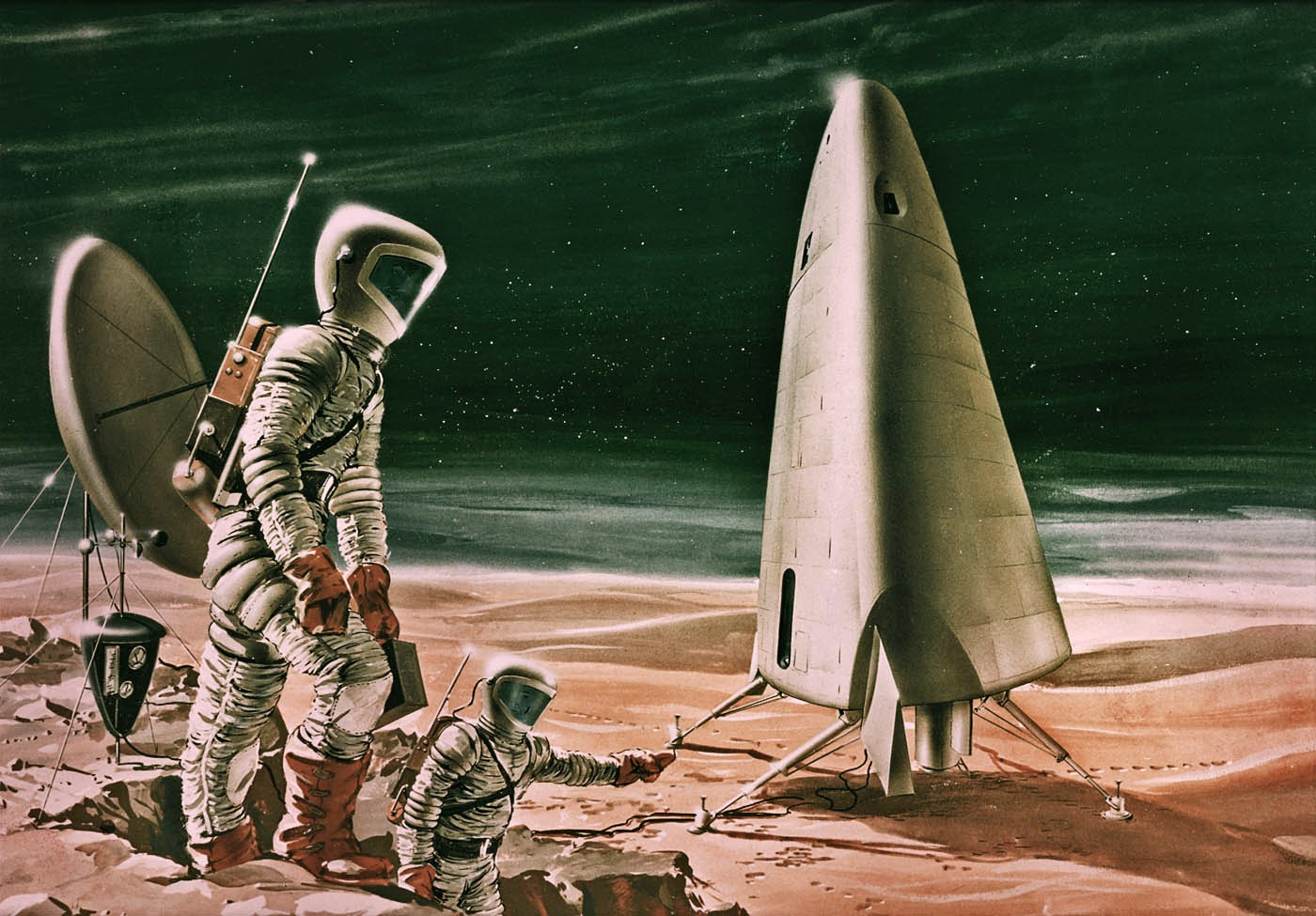
Artist's conception of the Mars Excursion Module (MEM) proposed in a NASA study in 1963. Crew wear Mars suits on surface EVA from the module.

From 1957 to 1965, work was done by General Atomics on Project Orion, a proposal for a nuclear pulse propulsion spacecraft. Orion was intended to have the ability to transport extremely large payloads compared to chemical rocketry, making crewed missions to Mars and the outer planets feasible. One of the early vehicle designs was intended to send an 800-ton payload to Mars orbit. The Partial Nuclear Test Ban Treaty of 1963 made further development unviable, and work ended in 1965.

In 1962, Aeronutronic Ford, General Dynamics and the Lockheed Missiles and Space Company made studies of Mars mission designs as part of NASA Marshall Spaceflight Center's "Project EMPIRE". These studies indicated that a Mars mission (possibly including a Mercury and Venus fly-by) could be done with a launch of eight Saturn V boosters and assembly in low Earth orbit, or possibly with a single launch of a hypothetical "post Saturn" heavy-lift vehicle. Although the EMPIRE missions were never proposed for funding, they were the first detailed analyses of what it would take to accomplish a human voyage to Mars using data from actual NASA spaceflight, laying the basis for future studies, including significant mission studies by TRW, North American, Philco, Lockheed, Douglas, and General Dynamics, along with several in-house NASA studies.

Following the success of the Apollo Program, von Braun advocated a crewed mission to Mars as a focus for NASA's crewed space program. Von Braun's proposal used Saturn V boosters to launch NERVA-powered upper stages that would propel two six-crew spacecraft on a dual mission in the early 1980s. The proposal was considered by President Richard Nixon, but passed over in favor of the Space Shuttle.

In 1975, von Braun discussed the mission architecture that emerged from these Apollo-era studies in a recorded lecture, and while doing so suggested that multiple shuttle launches could instead be configured to lift the two nuclear thermal rocket engine-equipped spacecraft in smaller parts, for assembly in orbit.

==== Soviet mission proposals (1956 through 1969) ====
The Martian Piloted Complex (MPK) was a proposal by Mikhail Tikhonravov of the Soviet Union for a crewed Mars expedition, using the (then-proposed) N1 rocket, in studies from 1956 to 1962. The Soviets sent many probes to Mars with some noted success stories, including Mars atmospheric entry, but the overall rate of success was low. (see Mars 3)

Heavy Interplanetary Spacecraft (known by the Russian acronym TMK) was the designation of a Soviet space exploration proposal in the 1960s to send a crewed flight to Mars and Venus (TMK-MAVR design) without landing. The TMK spacecraft was due to launch in 1971 and make a 3-year-long flight including a Mars fly-by, at which time probes would have been dropped. The project was never completed because the required N1 rocket never flew successfully. The Mars Expeditionary Complex, or "'MEK"' (1969) was another Soviet proposal for a Mars expedition that would take a crew from three to six to Mars and back with a total mission duration of 630 days.

==== Case for Mars (1981–1996) ====
Following the Viking missions to Mars, between 1981 and 1996, several conferences named the Case for Mars were held at the University of Colorado at Boulder. These conferences advocated human exploration of Mars, presented concepts and technologies, and held a series of workshops to develop a baseline concept for the mission. It proposed use of in-situ resource utilization to manufacture rocket propellant for the return trip. The mission study was published in a series of proceedings volumes. Later conferences presented alternative concepts, including the "Mars Direct" concept of Robert Zubrin and David Baker; the "Footsteps to Mars" proposal of Geoffrey A. Landis, which proposed intermediate steps before the landing on Mars, including human missions to Phobos; and the "Great Exploration" proposal from Lawrence Livermore National Laboratory, among others.

==== NASA Space Exploration Initiative (1989) ====
In response to a presidential initiative, NASA made a study of a project for human lunar- and Mars exploration as a proposed follow-on to the International Space Station. This resulted in a report, called the 90-day study, in which the agency proposed a long-term plan consisting of completing the Space Station as "a critical next step in all our space endeavors," returning to the Moon and establishing a permanent base, and then sending astronauts to Mars. This report was widely criticized as too elaborate and expensive, and all funding for human exploration beyond Earth orbit was canceled by Congress.

==== Mars Direct (early 1990s) ====
Because of the greater distance, the Mars mission would be much more risky and expensive than past Moon flights. Supplies and fuel would have to be prepared for a 2- to 3-year round trip and the spacecraft would need at least partial shielding from ionizing radiation. A 1990 paper by Robert Zubrin and David A. Baker, then of Martin Marietta, proposed reducing the mission mass (and hence the cost) by using in situ resource utilization to manufacture propellant from the Martian atmosphere. This proposal drew on concepts developed by the former "Case for Mars" conference series. Over the next decade, Zubrin developed it into a mission concept, Mars Direct, which he presented in a book, The Case for Mars (1996). The mission is advocated by the Mars Society, which Zubrin founded in 1998, as practical and affordable.

==== International Space University (1991) ====
In 1991 in Toulouse, France, the International Space University studied an international human Mars mission. They proposed a crew of 8 traveling to Mars in a nuclear-powered vessel with artificial gravity provided by rotation. On the surface, 40-tonne habitats pressurized to 10 psi (69 kPa) were powered by a 40 kW photovoltaic array.

==== NASA Design reference missions (1990s) ====
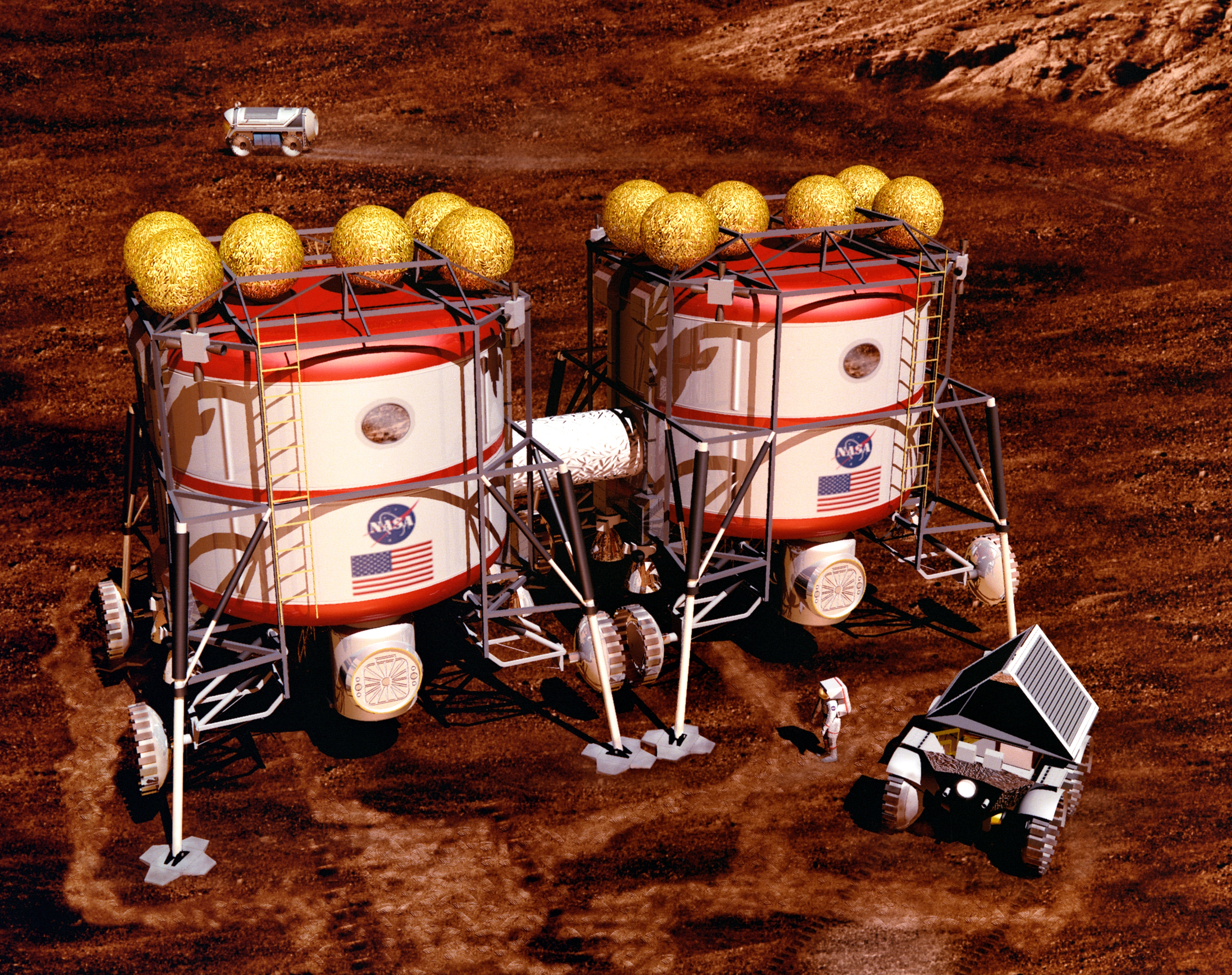
NASA Mars habitat concept for DRA 1.0, derived from the Mars Direct Architecture, 1995

In the 1990s, NASA developed several conceptual-level human Mars exploration architectures. One of these was NASA Design reference mission 3.0 (DRM 3.0) to stimulate further thought and concept development.

Selected other US/NASA studies (1988–2009):

1. 1988 "Mars Expedition"
2. 1989 "Mars Evolution"
3. 1990 "90-Day Study"
4. 1991 "Synthesis Group"
5. 1995 "DRM 1"
6. 1997 "DRM 3"
7. 1998 "DRM 4"
8. 1999 "Dual Landers"

=== 21st century ===
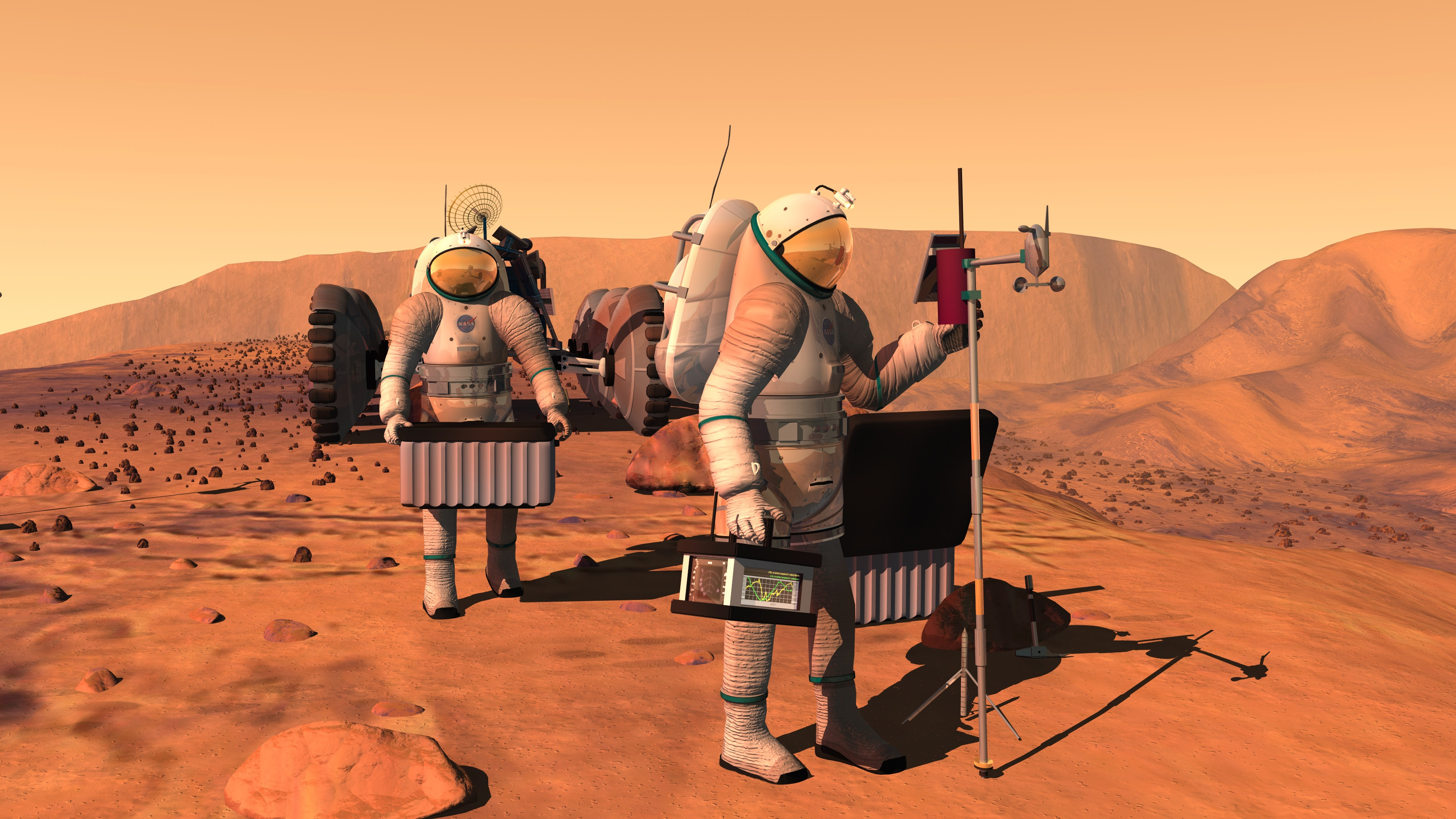
Artist's concept of crew members setting up weather monitoring equipment on the surface of Mars

==== NASA Design reference missions (2000+) ====
The NASA Mars Design Reference Missions consisted of a series of conceptual design studies for human Mars missions, continued in the 21st century. Selected other US/NASA plans (1988–2009):

11. 2000 SERT (SSP)
12. 2001 DPT/NEXT
13. 2002 NEP Art. Gravity
14. 2009 DRA 5

==== MARPOST (2000–2005) ====
The Mars Piloted Orbital Station (MARPOST) is a Russian-proposed crewed orbital mission to Mars, using a nuclear reactor to run an electric rocket engine. Proposed in October 2000 as the next step for Russia in space along with participation in the International Space Station, a 30-volume draft project for MARPOST was confirmed as of 2005. Design for the ship was proposed to be ready in 2012, and the ship itself in 2021.

==== ESA Aurora programme (2001+) ====
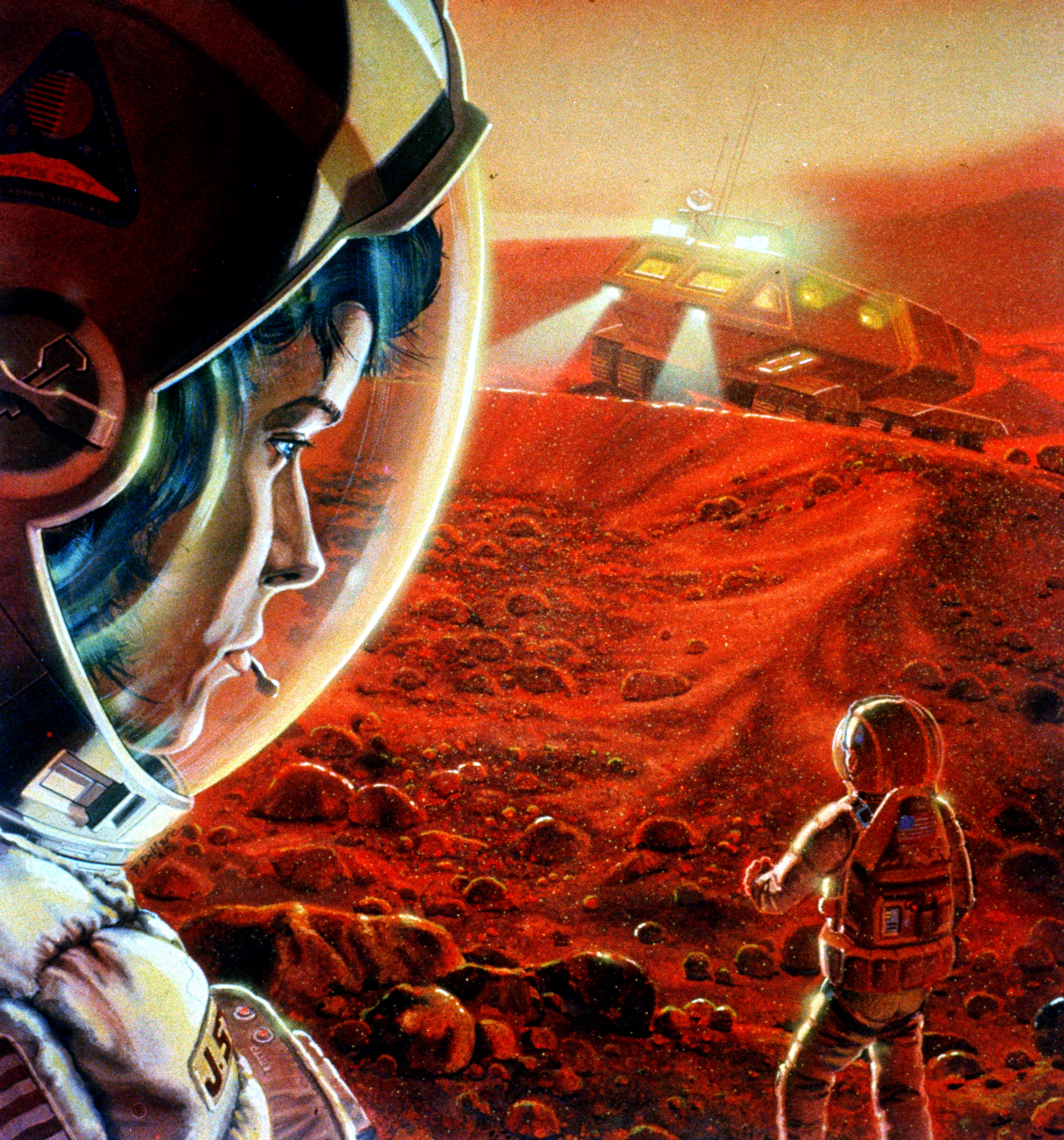
Artwork featuring astronauts enduring a Mars dust storm near a rover

In 2001, the European Space Agency (ESA) laid out a long-term vision of sending a human mission to Mars in 2033. The project's proposed timeline would begin with robotic exploration, a proof of concept simulation of sustaining humans on Mars, and eventually a crewed mission. Objections from the participating nations of ESA and other delays have put the timeline into question, and currently ExoMars, delivered an orbiter to Mars in 2016, have come to fruition.

==== ESA/Russia plan (2002) ====
Another proposal for a joint ESA mission with Russia is based on two spacecraft being sent to Mars, one carrying a six-person crew and the other the expedition's supplies. The mission would take about 440 days to complete, with three astronauts visiting the surface of the planet for a period of two months. The entire project would cost $20 billion and Russia would contribute 30% of these funds.

==== USA Vision for Space Exploration (2004) ====
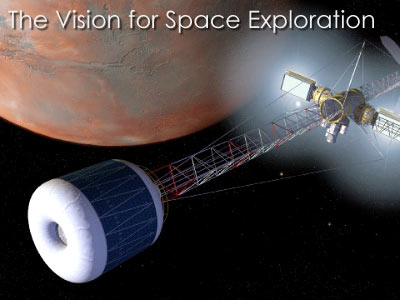
Project Constellation included an Orion Mars Mission.

On 14 January 2004, George W. Bush announced the Vision for Space Exploration, an initiative of crewed space exploration. It included developing preliminary plans for a return to the Moon by 2012 and establishing an outpost by 2020. By 2005, precursor missions that would help develop the needed technology during the 2010s were tentatively outlined. On 24 September 2007, Michael Griffin, then NASA Administrator, hinted that NASA would be able to launch a human mission to Mars by 2037. The needed funds were to be generated by diverting $11 billion from space science missions to the vision for human exploration.

NASA has also discussed plans to launch Mars missions from the Moon to reduce traveling costs.

==== Mars Society Germany – European Mars Mission (EMM) (2005) ====
The Mars Society Germany proposed a crewed Mars mission using several launches of a heavy-lift rocket derived from the Ariane 5. Roughly five launches would be required to send a crew of five on a 1200-day mission, with a payload of 120,000 kg (260,000 lb). Total project cost was estimated to be 10 to 15 billion euros.

==== China National Space Administration (CNSA) (2006) ====
Sun Laiyan, administrator of the China National Space Administration, said on July 20, 2006, that China would start deep-space exploration focusing on Mars over the next five years, during the Eleventh Five-Year Plan (2006–2010) program period. The first uncrewed Mars exploration program could take place between 2014 and 2033, followed by a crewed phase in 2040–2060 in which crew members would land on Mars and return home. The Mars 500 study of 2011 prepared for this crewed mission.

==== Mars to Stay (2006) ====
The idea of a one-way trip to Mars has been proposed several times. In 1988, space activist Bruce Mackenzie proposed a one-way trip to Mars in a presentation at the International Space Development Conference, arguing that the mission could be done with less difficulty and expense without a return to Earth. In 2006, former NASA engineer James C. McLane III proposed a scheme to initially colonize Mars via a one-way trip by only one human. Papers discussing this concept appeared in The Space Review, Harper's Magazine, SEARCH Magazine and The New York Times.

==== NASA Design Reference Mission 5.0 (2007) ====
NASA released initial details of the latest version conceptual level human Mars exploration architecture in this presentation. The study further developed concepts developed in previous NASA DRM and updated it to more current launchers and technology.

==== Martian Frontier (2007–2011) ====
Mars 500, the longest high-fidelity spaceflight simulation, ran from 2007 to 2011 in Russia, and was an experiment to assess the feasibility of crewed missions to Mars.

==== NASA Design Reference Mission Architecture 5.0 (2009) ====
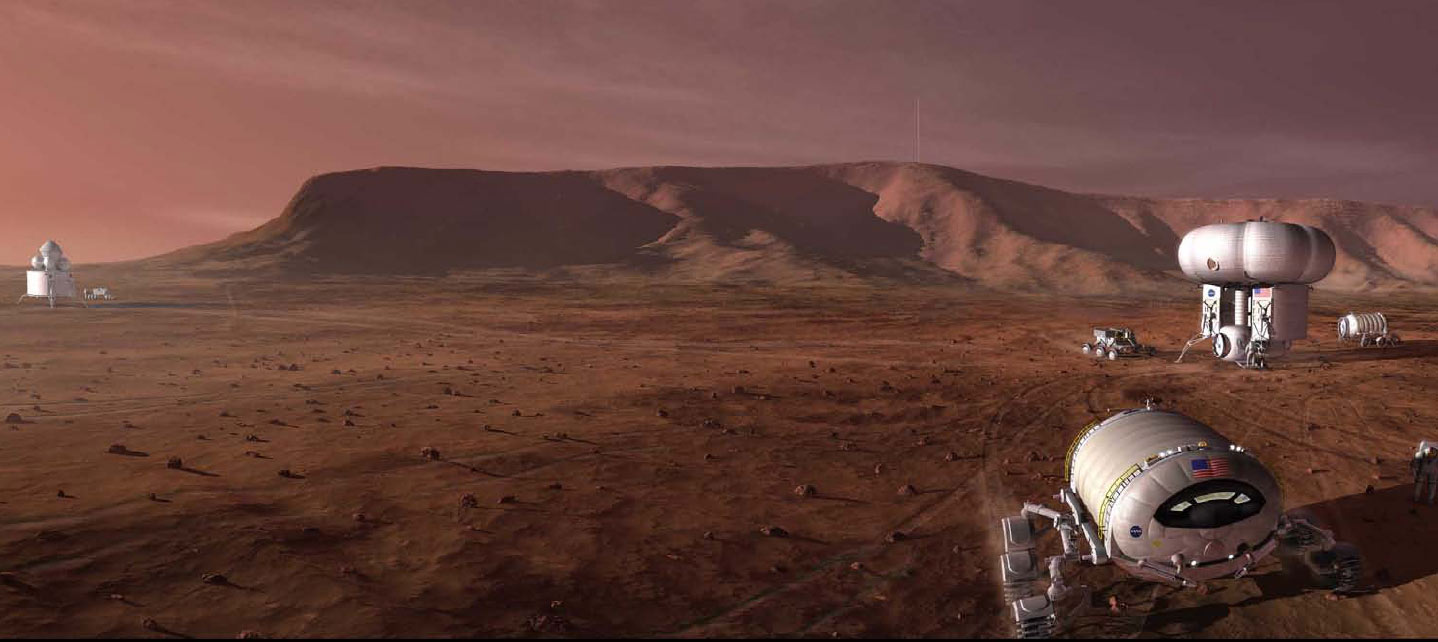
Concept for NASA's Design Reference Mission Architecture 5.0 (2009)

NASA released an updated version of NASA DRM 5.0 in early 2009, featuring use of the Ares V launcher, Orion CEV, and updated mission planning. In this document.

==== NASA Austere Human Missions to Mars (2009) ====
Extrapolated from the DRMA 5.0, plans for a crewed Mars expedition with chemical propulsion. Austere Human Missions to Mars

==== Mars orbit by the mid-2030s (2010) ====
In a major space policy speech at Kennedy Space Center on 15 April 2010, Barack Obama predicted a crewed Mars mission to orbit the planet by the mid-2030s, followed by a landing. This proposal was mostly supported by Congress, which approved cancelling Project Constellation in favor of a 2025 Asteroid Redirect Mission and orbiting Mars in the 2030s. The Asteroid Redirect Mission was cancelled in June 2017 and "closed out" in September of the same year.

==== Russian mission proposals (2011) ====
Several Mars mission concepts and proposals have been put forth by Russian scientists. The stated dates were for a launch sometime between 2016 and 2020. The Mars probe would carry a crew of four or five cosmonauts, who would spend close to two years in space.

In late 2011, Russian and European space agencies successfully completed the ground-based MARS-500. The biomedical experiment simulating crewed flight to Mars was completed in Russia in July 2000.

==== 2-4-2 concept (2011–2012) ====
In 2012, Jean-Marc Salotti published a new proposal for a crewed Mars mission. The '2-4-2' concept is based on a reduction of the crew size to two astronauts and the duplication of the entire mission. Two astronauts are in each space vehicle, four are on the surface of Mars, and two are once again in each return vehicle. If one set of hardware runs into trouble, the other astronauts are ready to help (two for two). This architecture simplifies the entry, descent, and landing procedures by reducing the size of the landing vehicles. It also avoids the assembly of huge vehicles in LEO. The author claims that his proposal is much cheaper than the NASA reference mission without compromising the risks and can be undertaken before 2030.

==== Boeing Conceptual Space Vehicle Architecture (2012) ====
In 2012, a conceptual architecture was published by Boeing, United Launch Alliance, and RAL Space in Britain, laying out a possible design for a crewed Mars mission. Components of the architecture include various spacecraft for the Earth-to-Mars journey, landing, and surface stay, as well as return. Some features include several uncrewed cargo landers assembled into a base on the surface of Mars. The crew would land at this base in the "Mars Personnel Lander", which could also take them back into Mars orbit. The design for the crewed interplanetary spacecraft included artificial gravity and an artificial magnetic field for radiation protection. Overall, the architecture was modular to allow for incremental R&D.

==== Mars One (2012–2019) ====
In 2012, a Dutch entrepreneur group began raising funds for a human Mars base to be established in 2023. The mission was intended to be primarily a one-way trip to Mars. Astronaut applications were invited from the public all over the world, for a fee.

The initial concept included an orbiter and a small robotic lander in 2018, followed by a rover in 2020, and the base components in 2024. The first crew of four astronauts was to land on Mars in 2025. Then, every two years, a new crew of four would arrive. Financing was intended to come from selling the broadcasting rights of the entire training and of the flight as a reality television show, and that money would be used to contract for all hardware and launch services. In April 2015, Mars One's CEO Bas Lansdorp admitted that their 12-year plan for landing humans on Mars by 2027 is "mostly fiction". The company comprising the commercial arm of Mars One went bankrupt in January 2019.

==== Inspiration Mars Foundation (2013) ====
In 2013, the Inspiration Mars Foundation founded by Dennis Tito revealed plans of a crewed mission to fly by Mars in 2018 with support from NASA. NASA refused to fund the mission.

==== Boeing Affordable Mission (2014) ====
On December 2, 2014, NASA's Advanced Human Exploration Systems and Operations Mission Director Jason Crusan and Deputy Associate Administrator for Programs James Reuthner announced tentative support for the Boeing "Affordable Mars Mission Design" including radiation shielding, centrifugal artificial gravity, in-transit consumable resupply, and a lander which can return. Reuthner suggested that if adequate funding was forthcoming, the proposed mission would be expected in the early 2030s.

==== Mars Semi-Direct Revisited (2016) ====
As the Earth Return Vehicle was deemed very heavy, Robert Zubrin proposed in 1993 a "semi-direct" scenario, in which the outbound trip is still direct to the surface but the return is split into two steps, first going back to Mars orbit using a relatively small ascent vehicle in order to join a return vehicle that is sent there a long time in advance. As the return is not direct anymore, the scenario is called "semi-direct". In 2016, Jean-Marc Salotti made new calculations and revisited the architecture of the mission, showing that 4 heavy launches of the heaviest version of the NASA Space Launch System would be sufficient for its implementation

==== NASA's Journey to Mars and Moon to Mars Programs (2015–present) ====
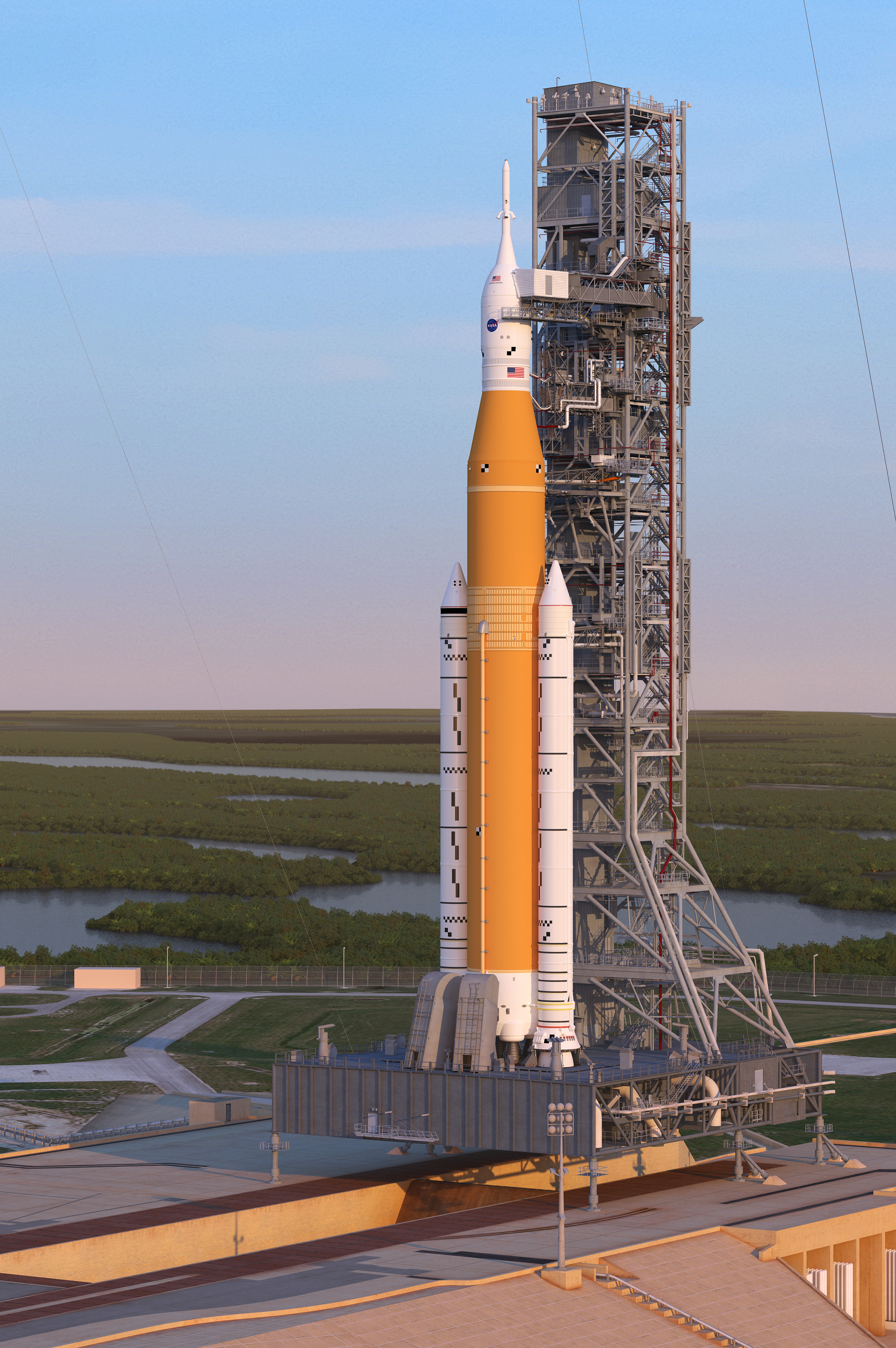
Artist's rendering of SLS Block 1/Orion

On October 8, 2015, NASA published its strategy for human exploration and sustained human presence on Mars. The concept operates through three distinct phases leading up to sustainable human presence.

The first stage, already underway, is the "Earth Reliant" phase, which continued using the International Space Station until 2024, validating deep space technologies and studying the effects of long-duration space missions on the human body.

The second stage, "Proving Ground", moves away from Earth reliance and ventures into cislunar space for most of its tasks. The proposed Lunar Gateway would test deep-space habitation facilities, and validate capabilities required for human exploration of Mars.

Finally, phase three is the transition to independence from Earth resources. The "Earth Independent" phase includes long-term missions on the Martian surface with habitats that only require routine maintenance, and the harvesting of Martian resources for fuel, water, and building materials. NASA is still aiming for human missions to Mars in the 2030s, though Earth independence could take decades longer.

In November 2015, Administrator Bolden of NASA reaffirmed the goal of sending humans to Mars. He laid out 2030 as the date of a crewed surface landing on Mars, and noted that the 2021 Mars rover, Perseverance would support the human mission.

In March 2019, Vice President Mike Pence declared, "American astronauts will walk on the Moon again before the end of 2024, 'by any means necessary'." This reportedly prompted NASA to accelerate their plans to return to the Moon's surface by 2024. NASA says it will use the Artemis lunar program in combination with the Lunar Gateway as stepping stones to make great scientific strides "to take the next giant leap - sending astronauts to Mars". The Artemis mission to land on the Moon was later delayed until early 2028.

==== SpaceX Mars transportation infrastructure (2016–present) ====
In 2016, SpaceX announced that it planned to send a Red Dragon capsule for a soft landing on Mars by 2018, but they halted the effort by mid-2017 in order to focus engineering resources to the effort that would later become known as "Starship."

SpaceX has publicly proposed a plan to begin the colonization of Mars by developing a high-capacity transportation infrastructure. As discussed in 2016, the ITS launch vehicle conceptual design was to be a large reusable booster topped by a spaceship or a tanker for in-orbit refueling. The aspirational objective at that time was to advance the technology and infrastructure so that the first humans to Mars could potentially depart as early as 2024.

As the top development priority of SpaceX became developing a larger and more capable launch vehicle after 2018, Elon Musk has continued to articulate aspirational plans for early Mars missions as one objective of that program. In September 2017, Musk announced an updated vehicle design for the Mars mission at the International Astronautical Congress. The vehicle for this mission was called BFR (Big Falcon Rocket) until 2018, when it was renamed "Starship". Starship is planned to provide the capability for on-orbit activity like satellite delivery, servicing the International Space Station, Moon missions, as well as Mars missions. Cargo flights to Mars would precede crewed flights.

- Elon Musk claimed that as early as 2024, pathfinder Starship cargo vehicles could be sent to Mars.
- Musk asserts that crewed Starship vehicles would follow, at the earliest in 2026, two years after the first cargo flights.

==== Mars Base Camp (2016) ====
Mars Base Camp is a US spacecraft concept that proposes to send astronauts to Mars orbit as early as 2028. The vehicle concept, developed by Lockheed Martin, would use both future and heritage technology, as well as the Orion spacecraft built by NASA.

==== Deep Space Transport (2017) ====
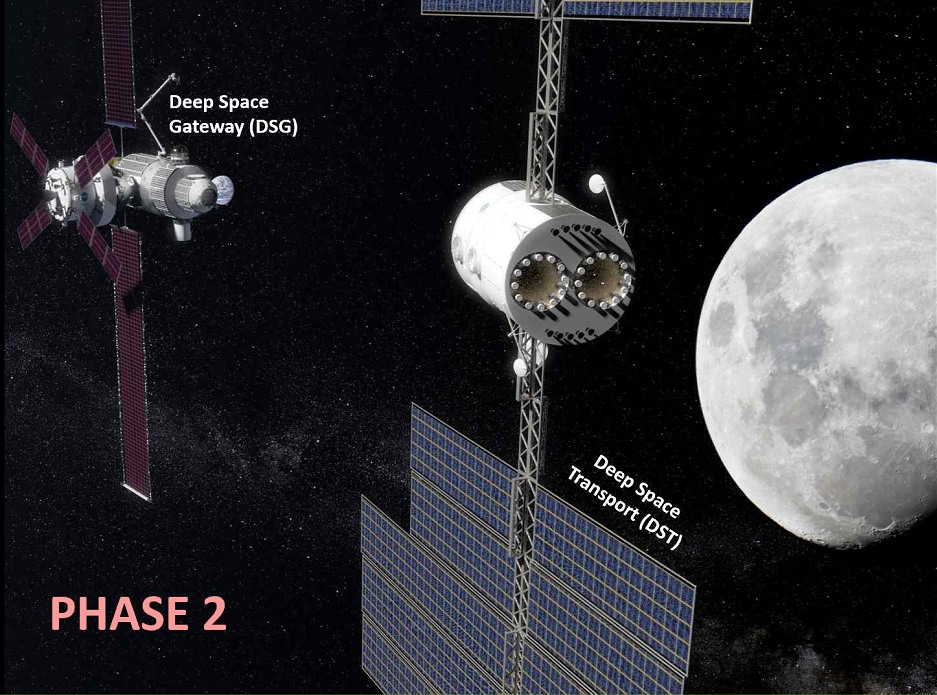
Artist impression of the Deep Space Transport, about to dock with the Lunar Gateway

The Deep Space Transport (DST), also called Mars Transit Vehicle, is a crewed interplanetary spacecraft concept by NASA to support science exploration missions to Mars of up to 1,000 days. It would be composed of two elements - an Orion capsule and a propelled habitation module. As of April 2018, the DST is still a concept to be studied, and NASA has not officially proposed the project in an annual U.S. federal government budget cycle.

The DST vehicle would depart and return from the Lunar Gateway to be serviced and reused for a new Mars mission.

==== Strategic Analysis Cycle 2021 (2022) ====
In 2022, NASA's Strategic Analysis Cycle 2021 proposed a mission architecture based around the Artemis spacecraft. The landing would take place in 2039. Of the 4-person crew, two would land on the surface for 30 sols, and two remain in orbit in the DST.

== See also ==
- Colonization of Mars
- Exploration of Mars
- Human mission to Mars
- Manned Venus flyby
- Mars sample-return mission
- List of launch vehicle designs
- List of missions to Mars
- Mars Piloted Orbital Station

== Further reading and external links ==
- Mars Expeditions and Flybys and Selected Flybys List of most crewed mission projects to Mars
- Colliers Images from Colliers Magazine of the Von Braun Moon and Mars missions
- Reference Mission Version 3.0, Addedum to Human Exploration of Mars (Design Reference Mission 3.0)
- When Will We Land on Mars? by Dr. Wernher von Braun (Popular Science: March 1965) (Google Books link)
- Space Sailing, by Jerome L. Wright (Google Books link)
- Martian Moon Exploration Conference (2007)
- Future Planetary Exploration: MEPAG, OPAG, SBAG
- Space Gizmo- Concept Art
- Wandering Space : Mars
- Humans to Mars: Fifty Years of Mission Planning, 1950-2000 by David Portree
