= Aelita project =

1969 Soviet project of a crewed flight to Mars

Aelita Mars Expedition
- Manufacturer: OKB-1
- Designer: Konstantin Feoktistov and Vladimir Chelomei
- Country of origin: Soviet Union
- Operator: Soviet space program
- Applications: Crewed martian landing

Specifications
- Spacecraft type: Crewed spacecraft
- Launch mass: 150,000 kg
- Crew capacity: 3 - 6
- Dimensions: 175 m length 4.1 m wide
- Power: Nuclear electric
- Regime: Mars orbit
- Design life: ~630 days

Production
- Status: Canceled

MPK (Mars Landing Craft) (Martian descent/ascent)

Mars Expeditionary Complex (MEK), code name Aelita was a 1969 abandoned Soviet project of a crewed flight to Mars. It was named after the 1923 science fiction novel Aelita by Russian author Aleksey Tolstoy about a flight to Mars.

The project considered a crew of three to six astronauts, with a total mission duration of 630 days. Initially three design bureaus competed for mission design.

The final version, by Chelomei, consisted of a 175 meter long MEK subdivided into the Mars Landing Craft (MPK), the Mars Orbit Spacecraft (MOK), Recovery Apparatus (VA), radiation shield, telescoping thermionic radiator booms, Power and Engine Section (YaERDU).

== See also ==
- Martian Piloted Complex, a 1956-62 Soviet project
