= MPK =

MPK may refer to:

== Politics and government ==
- Minjoo Party of Korea
- Majlis Perbandaran Klang, the former municipal council of Klang, Malaysia, which has since been upgraded to the Klang Royal City Council
- Maanpuolustuskoulutusyhdistys (MPK), National Defence Training Association of Finland, a Finnish government-organised voluntary military training organisation

== Science, technology and engineering ==
- Martian Piloted Complex or MPK, Soviet-era concept for a human mission to Mars
- Memory protection key, a mechanism to divide computer memory
- .mpk, a filename extension used by Nintendo 64 emulators
- Methyl propyl ketone, a colorless liquid ketone
- MPK, the short version of the Walther MP submachine gun

== Transportation ==
- Mokpo Airport (IATA airport code), Mokpo, South Korea
- Moorpark (Amtrak station), an Amtrak and Metrolink rail station in California, US
- Mosspark railway station, a First ScotRail station on Paisley Canal Line, Scotland
- Merinda Park railway station, a station in Melbourne, Australia

== Other uses ==
- Magpakailanman, a Philippine drama anthology program broadcast by GMA Network
- Maine Pyar Kiya, a 1989 Bollywood film
- Marginal product of capital, in economics
- Menlo Park, California, United States

== See also ==
- MP5K, a Heckler & Koch submachine Gun
