= Ride Report =

Informal name for a 1986 NASA report

The Ride Report is the informal name of the report titled NASA Leadership and America's Future in Space: A Report to the Administrator. In 1986, a task force under the leadership of Sally Ride was asked to formulate a new strategy for NASA. The report was issued in 1987.

The Ride Report proposed four main initiatives for study and evaluation. These were:

1. Mission to Planet Earth
2. Exploration of the Solar System
3. Outpost on the Moon
4. Humans to Mars

"Mission to Planet Earth" would be centred on the observation of our home planet. New technologies for observation would be needed, and launch capabilities for geostationary and polar orbits. The space station that was under planning at the time this report was issued, is called simply "the Space Station" and is more ambitious than the current ISS, in that it would be well-developed enough to have ability for assembly of satellites and platforms in orbit. A transfer vehicle to launch these into geostationary orbit is proposed as well.

In the section "Exploration of the Solar System", the report points out that there are too few planetary exploration missions planned. It proposes some new missions, such as a cometary mission, an extended Cassini mission (including three probes; one for the study of the atmosphere of Saturn, one atmospheric Titan probe and one to land on Titan) and a Mars sample return mission.

A permanent lunar outpost is discussed in "Outpost on the Moon". This goal would be reached through three phases, where the first would deal with robotic exploration during the 1990s to find a suitable site. In the second phase, astronauts would be launched to the Moon on a Lunar transfer vehicle from the Space Station. They would bring scientific instruments and equipment and modules for the outpost. In the third phase, the outpost would be a permanent installation, with closed-loop life-support systems, and great abilities for exploration of the Moon. According to the plan, there would be a crew of 30 living and working on the Moon by 2010.

In "Humans to Mars" the ambitious goal of crewed Mars landings is proposed to happen as soon as 2010. Preparations for these missions include robotic exploration of Mars, with orbiters, rovers and sample return missions. The Space Station was to be used for study of the human body during long space flights. The construction of an outpost on Mars could begin during the 2020s.

The Ride Report also recognizes the risks of making the Space Station dependent on one single launch vehicle - the Space Shuttle. It proposes the development of a shuttle-derived cargo launcher, as a way of diversifying the launch fleet.

== See also ==
- Space Exploration Initiative
- Colonization of the Moon
- Colonization of Mars
- List of crewed Mars mission plans in the 20th century
