= NASA Design Reference Mission 3.0 =

NASA study

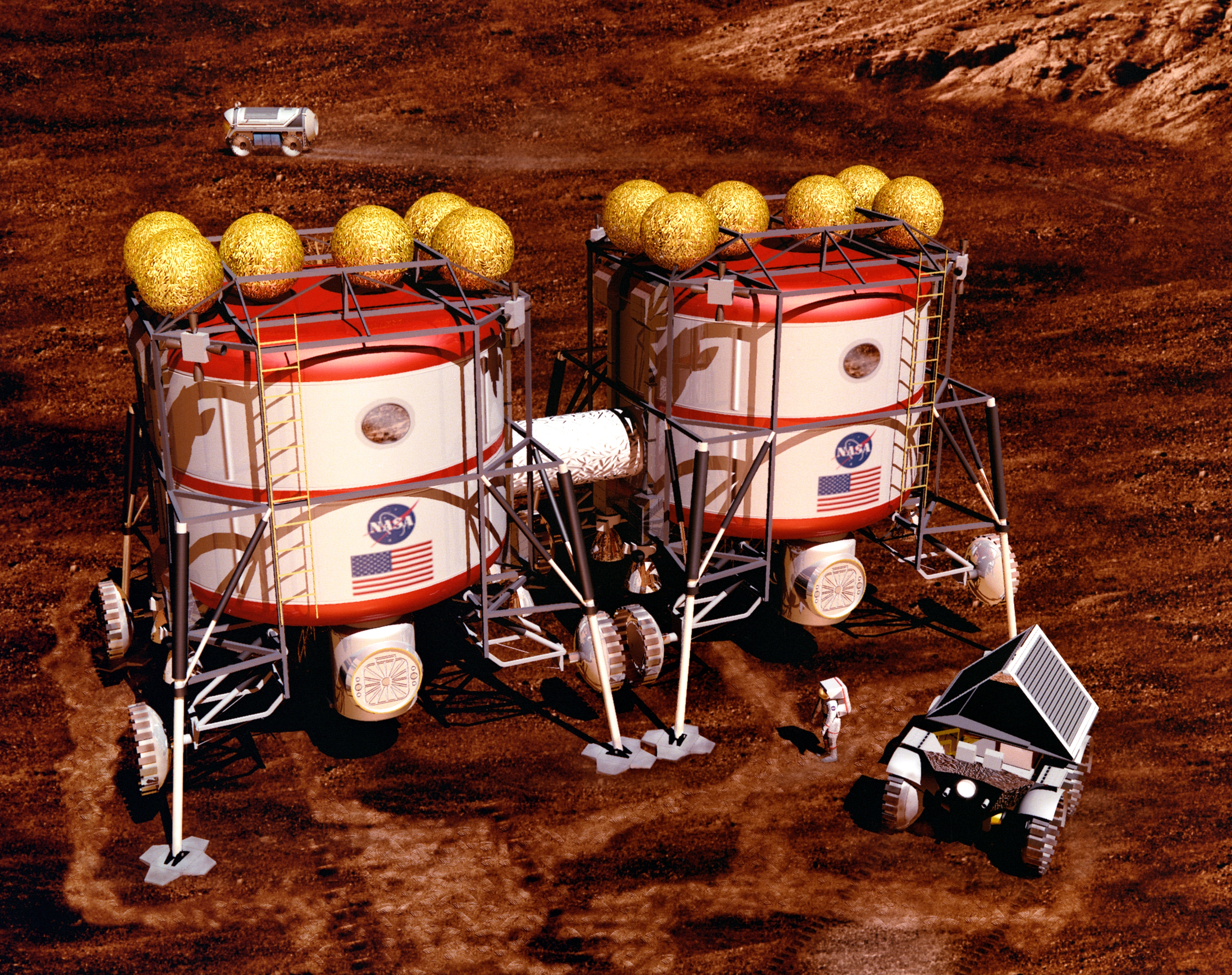
Artist concept of a Mars habitat

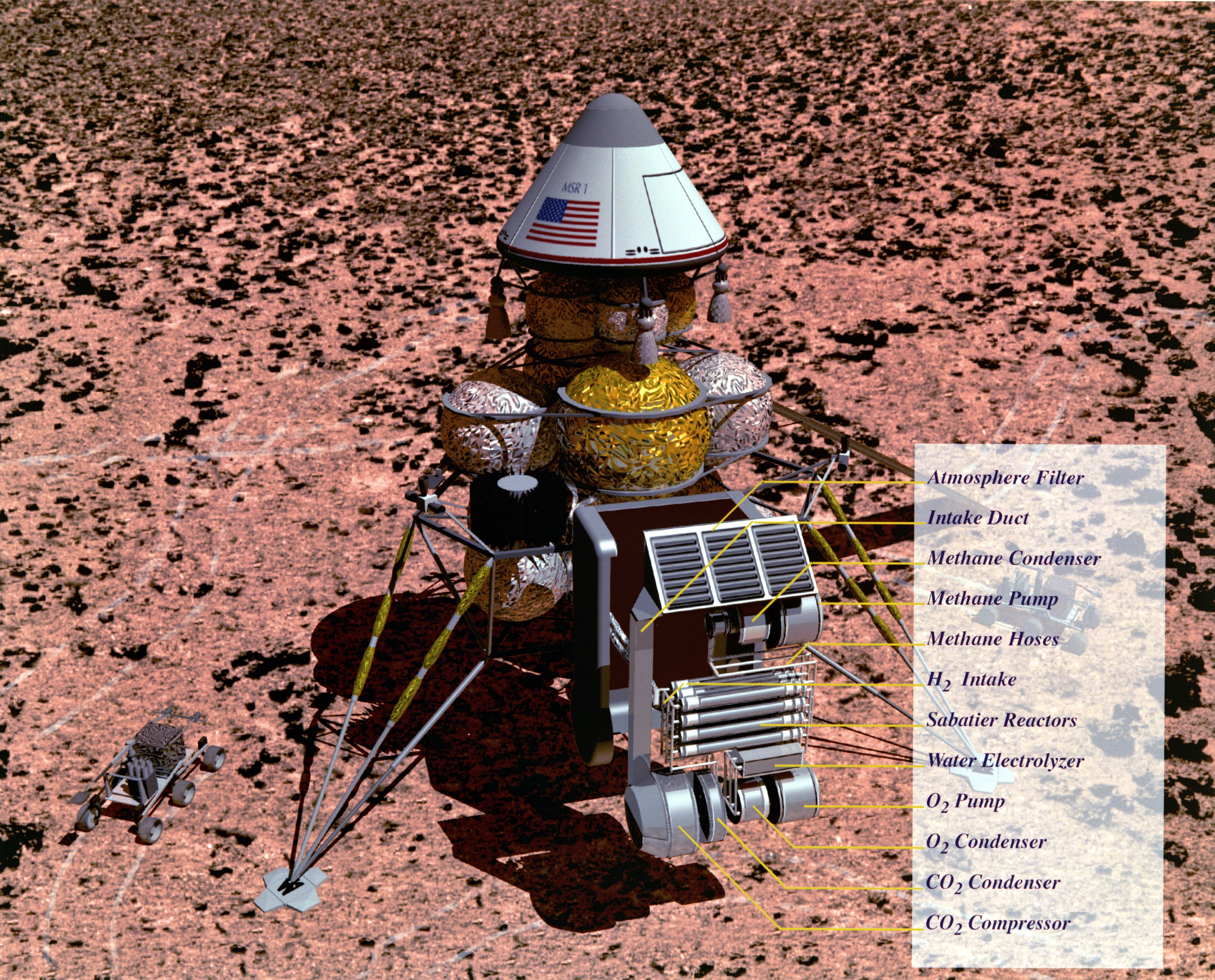
Artist concept of a Mars sample return mission

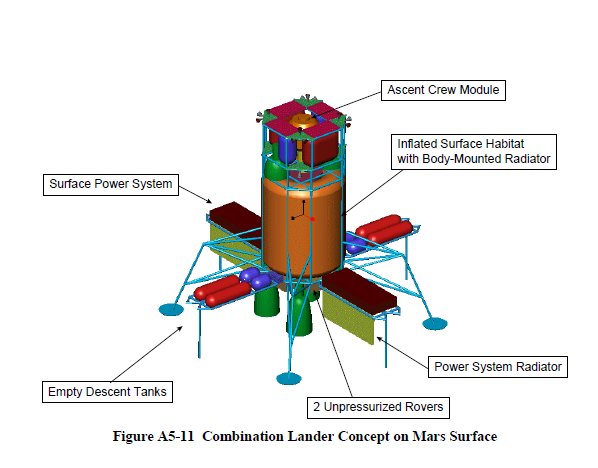
A concept for a combined surface habitat and ascent vehicle from the 1990s era Design Reference Mission 3.0

NASA Design Reference Mission 3.0 was a NASA study for a human space mission to the planet Mars in the 1990s. It was a plan for a human exploration architecture for Mars, and was released in 1998 as an addendum to the early design plans released in 1994. The plan is for a series of multiple launches to send various space transportation, surface exploration hardware, and human crew to Mars, and to return the crew to Earth in the early 21st century. Various technologies are explored to launch the payloads into space, to send them to Mars, and to reduce overall weight of the mission by various technologies or techniques including nuclear, solar, aerobraking, and in-situ resource use.

== Overview ==
The study was performed by the NASA Mars Exploration Team at the NASA's Johnson Space Center (JSC) in the 1990s. Personnel representing several NASA field centers formulated a "Reference Mission" addressing human exploration of Mars. The plan describes the first human missions to Mars with concept of operations and technologies to be used as a first cut at an architecture. The architecture for the Mars Reference Mission builds on previous work, principally on the work of the Synthesis Group (1991) and Robert Zubrin's (1991) concepts for the use of propellants derived from the Martian atmosphere. The primary purpose of the Reference Mission was to stimulate further thought and development of alternative approaches which can improve effectiveness, reduce risks, and reduce cost. Improvements can be made at several levels; for example, in the architectural, mission, and system levels.

The report of the Reference Mission Version 3.0 states:

From the work of the original Reference Mission (Version 1.0), the strategy for the human exploration of Mars has evolved from its original form to one of reduced system mass, use of a smaller, more reasonable launch vehicle, and use of more current technology. The steps which have been taken by the Exploration Team are motivated by the need to reduce the mass of the payload delivery flights, as well as the overall mission cost, without introducing additional mission risk. By eliminating the need for a large heavy-lift launch vehicle and deleting the redundant habitat delivery flight in Version 3.0, two launches from the Earth were eliminated. The net result is a current Version 3.0 Reference Mission which requires an injected mass of approximately one-half that of the 1993/94 Reference Mission.

The purpose of the Reference plan, including the 3.0 update is to provide a template for a variety of Mars mission planning and technology purposes, and also to stimulate thought and further ideas for Mars missions in the "exploration community and beyond".

== Aspects ==
List:

- Cargo Vehicles
- Piloted Vehicles
- Mars Surface Lander
- Inflatable Surface Habitat
- Magnum Launch Vehicle
- Propulsion studies including
  - Nuclear Thermal Rocket
  - Solar Electric
- Earth Return Vehicle
- Aerobrake at Mars
- In-situ resource
- Misc. Other items

== Mission items ==
The DRM 3.0 covered or touched upon a wide variety of institutions, vehicle, and mission concepts which are further explored or analyzed.

Examples:

- Evolved Expendable Launch Vehicle (EELV)
- Earth Entry Vehicle
- EVA Mobility Unit
- Electric Propulsion Module
- Earth Return Vehicle
- Extra Vehicular Activity
- Mars Habitat
- Heavy Lift Launch Vehicle
- Initial Mass in Low Earth Orbit
- In-Situ Resource Utilization
- Liquid Fly Back Booster
- Life Support System
- Mars Ascent Vehicle
- Mars Transfer Vehicle
- Nuclear Thermal Propulsion
- Nuclear Thermal Rocket
- Pressurized Control Research Vehicle
- Power Management and Distribution
- Photovoltaic Array
- Reaction Control System
- Shuttle Derived Vehicle
- Solar Electric Propulsion
- Space Transportation System
- Transit Habitat
- Thermal Protection System

Institutions

- Ames Research Center
- Marshall Space Flight Center
- Jet Propulsion Laboratory
- Johnson Space Center
- Kennedy Space Center
- Langley Research Center
- Lewis Research Center (later renamed Glenn Research Center)

== Mission plan ==
Info graphic highlight a possible sequence of launches to Mars and overall design. On the left is a sequence of launches that would send mission items to Mars and the right, it shows how they are utilized. A major component that was sent is the Earth return vehicle, which would use aerobraking to get into Mars orbit. Next, a cargo Mars lander would get important hardware to the surface of Mars which would also use aerobraking. Finally, the crew would land on the surface and use the pre-positioned hardware to conduct the mission and then return to Earth. This plan would use the in-situ production of fuel for Mars ascent stage of returning crew. Both aerocapture and in-situ resource production were methods to reduce overall launch weight of mission plan.

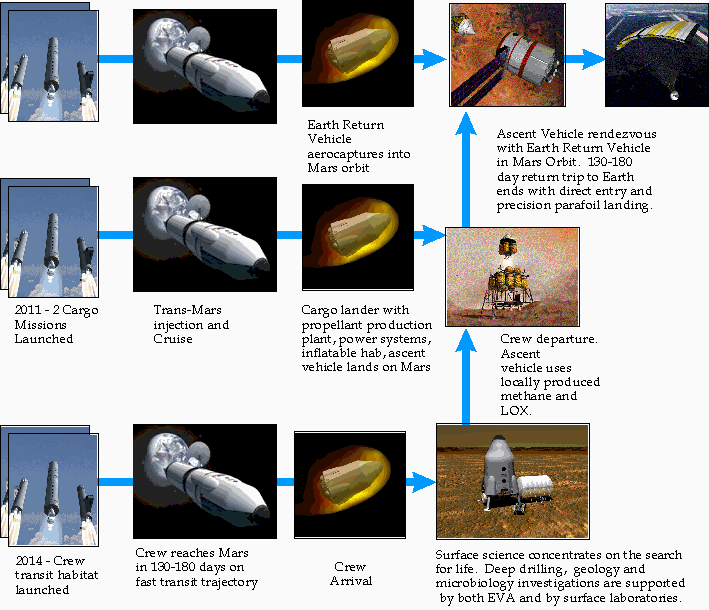
for 3.0 version

== See also ==
- Exploration of Mars
- Mars Direct
- Marsbook
- List of crewed Mars mission plans
