= TMK =

Soviet space exploration project

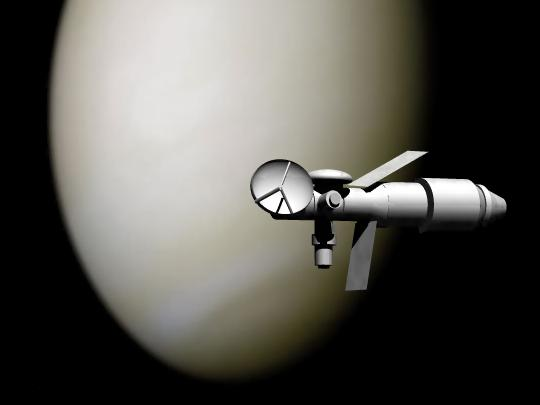
Artist's depiction of TMK-MAVR on a Venus flyby

TMK (Russian: Тяжелый Межпланетный Корабль, romanized: Tyazhelyy Mezhplanetnyy Korabl', lit. 'Heavy Interplanetary Vessel') was the designation of a Soviet space exploration project to send a crewed flight to Mars and Venus (TMK-MAVR design) without landing.

The TMK-1 spacecraft was due to be launched in 1971 and make a three-year-long flight including a Mars flyby, at which time probes would have been dropped. Expanded project variations, such as the TMK-E, Mavr or KK, including a Venus flyby, electric propulsion or a crewed Mars landing were also proposed.

The TMK project was planned as a response to the United States' crewed Moon landings. An earlier Martian Piloted Complex mission was proposed in 1956. The project was never completed because the required N1 rocket never flew successfully.

== TMK-1 ==
TMK-1
- Mission type: crewed interplanetary
- Mission duration: 1095 days

Spacecraft properties
- Spacecraft type: RP-1/LOX
- Dimensions: Length: 39 feet (12 m); Diameter: 19.60 feet (5.97 m); Volume: 4,555.6 cubic feet (129.00 m^{3})

Crew
- Crew size: 3
- Members: Soviet cosmonauts

Start of mission
- Launch date: June 8, 1971 (planned)
- Rocket: N1

End of mission
- Landing date: July 10, 1974 (planned)

Flyby of Mars
- Closest approach: April 1972 (planned)

The first flight to Mars of the TMK-1 was planned to begin on June 8, 1971.

The 75 metric ton TMK-1 spacecraft would take a crew of three on a Mars flyby mission. After a 10½ month flight the crew would race past Mars, dropping remote-controlled landers, and then be flung into an Earth-return trajectory. Earth return would happen on July 10, 1974, after a voyage of three years, one month, and two days.

Spacecraft configuration:

- A habitation or pilot compartment, with an internal volume of 25 cubic meters
- A work or equipment section, including the hatch for extra-vehicular activities and a solar storm shelter should solar flares increase radiation to dangerous levels. Total volume of the section would be 25 cubic meters
- A biological systems compartment, with the SOZh closed-cycle environmental control system, with a total volume of 75 cubic meters
- An aggregate section, with the Mars probe capsules, the KDU midcourse correction engine, the SOZh solar concentrator and solar panels, and radio antennas
- The SA crew Earth reentry capsule, about 4 m in diameter.

== TMK-E ==
TMK-E
- Mission type: crewed interplanetary
- Mission duration: 1096 days

Spacecraft properties
- Spacecraft type: Nuclear electric rocket (Xenon) Thrust: 74 newtons (17 lbf)
- Dimensions: Length: 574 feet (175 m); Diameter: 19.60 feet (5.97 m)

Crew
- Crew size: 6
- Members: Soviet cosmonauts

Start of mission
- Rocket: N1

Mars lander

This variation was proposed in 1960, and consisted of a complete Mars landing expedition to be assembled in Earth orbit using several N1 launches. The spacecraft would be powered by nuclear electric engines and five landers would deliver a nuclear-powered Mars Train on the surface for a one-year mission.

The TMK-E would be capable of a three-year flight to Mars and return, of which one year was powered flight. It would measure 175 m in length and house a crew of six. Six landing craft were included, two for the crew and four for the Mars Train vehicles.

== Mavr (MArs - VeneRa) ==
MAVR
- Mission type: crewed interplanetary
- Mission duration: 680 days

Spacecraft properties
- Spacecraft type: RP-1/LOX
- Dimensions: Length: 82 feet (25 m); Diameter: 19.60 feet (5.97 m); Volume: 45.0 cubic metres (1,590 ft^{3})

Crew
- Crew size: 3
- Members: Soviet cosmonauts

Start of mission
- Rocket: N1

Flyby of Mars

Flyby of Venus

A variation of the TMK mission planning involved a flyby of Venus on the return voyage, and was given the code name "Mavr" (MArs - VeneRa), meaning Mars - Venus.

== KK - Space Complex for Delivering a Piloted Expedition to Mars ==
KK - Space Complex for Delivering a Piloted Expedition to Mars
Description
Role:	Mars Expedition
Crew:	three
Rocket engines
Main Engine (Xenon) :	14 lbf ea	61 N
Performance
Endurance:	630 days	30 days Mars stay

In 1966, a final version of the TMK studies was known as KK - Space Complex for Delivering a Piloted Expedition to Mars. Nuclear electric propulsion was to be used for the 630-day mission. The craft structure consisted of:

- EK - Expeditionary spacecraft: command center for piloting in interplanetary space
- OK - Orbital Complex: living and work compartments and the life support systems
- SA - The Landing Module, AV - The Ascent Module and RV - The Ascent Rocket stage
- PS - The Planetary Station: used by the expedition on the Martian surface for life support and scientific research

The launch was planned for 1980, with a crew of three cosmonauts. Mars stay duration would be 30 days.

Mission data:

- Total Payload Required in Low Earth Orbit-metric tons: 150
- Total Propellant Required-metric tons: 24
- Number of Launches Required to Assemble Payload in Low Earth Orbit: 2
- Launch Vehicle: N1

== See also ==
- Human mission to Mars
- Manned Venus flyby
