= Orbit of Mars =

Martian orbit around the Sun

Orbit of Mars relative to the orbits of inner Solar System planets

Orbit of Mars and other Inner Solar System planets

An animation to explain the (apparent) retrograde motion of Mars, using actual 2020 planet positions

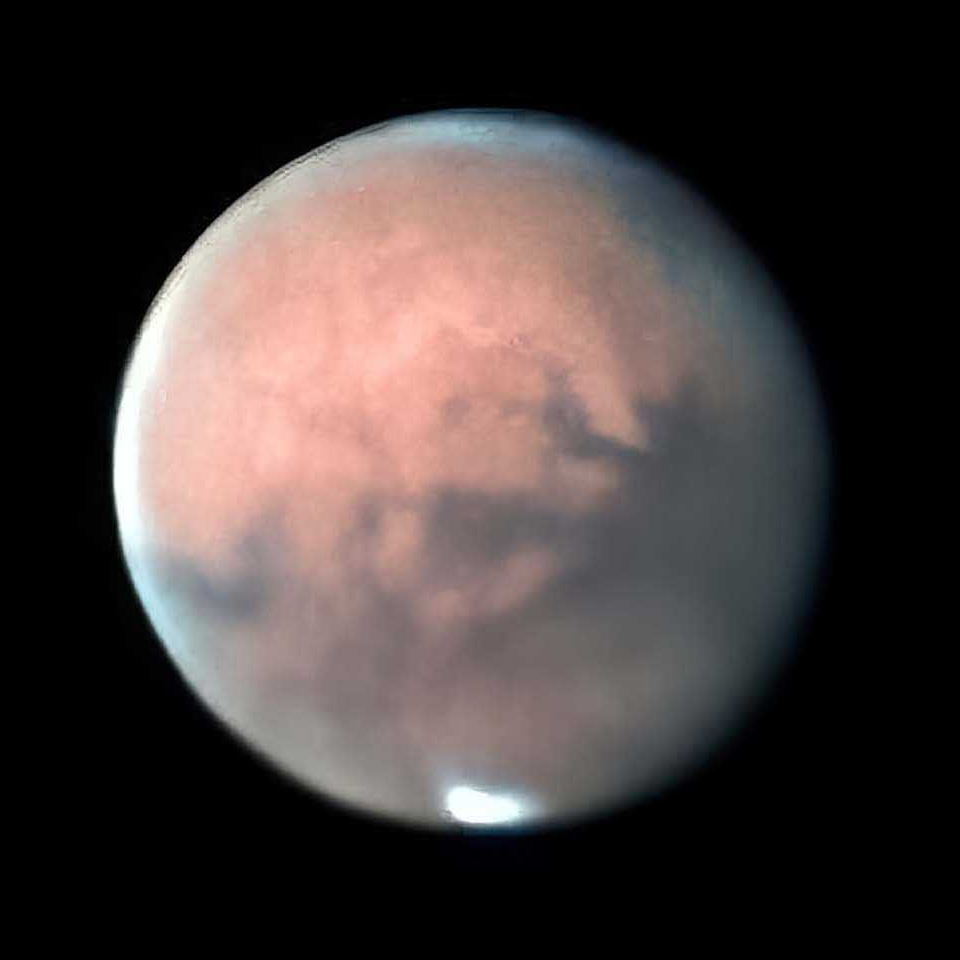
Mars seen through a 16-inch amateur telescope, at 2020 opposition

Mars has an orbit with a semimajor axis of 1.524 astronomical units (228 million km) (12.673 light minutes), and an eccentricity of 0.0934. The planet orbits the Sun in 687 days and travels 9.55 AU in doing so, making the average orbital speed 24 km/s.

The eccentricity is greater than that of any other planet except Mercury, and this causes a large difference between the aphelion and perihelion distances—they are respectively 1.666 and 1.381 AU.

== Changes in the orbit ==
Mars is in the midst of a long-term increase in eccentricity. It reached a minimum of 0.079 about 19 millennia ago, and will peak at about 0.105 after about 24 millennia from now (and with perihelion distances a mere 1.3621 astronomical units). The orbit is at times near circular: 1.35 million years ago it was 0.002, and will reach a similar minimum 1.05 million years into the future. The maximum eccentricity between those two extreme minima is 0.12 in about 200 thousand years.

== Oppositions ==
Mars reaches opposition when there is a 180° difference between the geocentric longitudes of it and the Sun. At a time near opposition (within 8½ days) the Earth–Mars distance is as small as it will get during that 780-day synodic period. Every opposition has some significance because Mars is visible from Earth all night, high and fully lit, but the ones of special interest happen when Mars is near perihelion, because this is when Mars is also nearest to Earth. One perihelic opposition is followed by another either 15 or 17 years later. In fact every opposition is followed by a similar one 7 or 8 synodic periods later, and by a very similar one 37 synodic periods (79 years) later. In the so-called perihelic opposition Mars is closest to the Sun and is particularly close to Earth: Oppositions range from about 0.68 AU when Mars is near aphelion to only about 0.37 AU when Mars is near perihelion.

== Close approaches to Earth ==
Mars comes closer to Earth more than any other planet except Venus at its nearest—56 million km is the closest distance between Mars and Earth, whereas the closest Venus comes to Earth is 40 million km. Mars comes closest to Earth every other year, around the time of its opposition, when Earth is sweeping between the Sun and Mars. Extra-close oppositions of Mars happen every 15 to 17 years, when we pass between Mars and the Sun around the time of its perihelion (closest point to the Sun in orbit). The minimum distance between Earth and Mars has been declining over the years, and in 2003 the minimum distance was 55.76 million km, nearer than any such encounter in almost 60,000 years (57,617 BC). The record minimum distance between Earth and Mars in 2729 will stand at 55.65 million km. In the year 3818, the record will stand at 55.44 million km, and the distances will continue to decrease for about 24,000 years.

== Historical importance ==
Until the work of Johannes Kepler (1571–1630), a German astronomer, the prevailing belief was that the Sun and planets orbited the Earth. In 1543, Nicolaus Copernicus had proposed that all the planets orbited in circles around the Sun, but his theory did not give very satisfactory predictions and was largely ignored. When Kepler studied his boss Tycho Brahe's observations of Mars's position in the sky on many nights, Kepler realized that Mars's orbit could not be a circle. After years of analysis, Kepler discovered that Mars's orbit was likely to be an ellipse, with the Sun at one of the ellipse's focal points. This, in turn, led to Kepler's discovery that all planets orbit the Sun in elliptical orbits, with the Sun at one of the two focal points. This became the first of Kepler's three laws of planetary motion.

== Accuracy/predictability ==
From the perspective of all but the most demanding, the path of Mars is simple. An equation in Astronomical Algorithms that assumes an unperturbed elliptical orbit predicts the perihelion and aphelion times with an error of "a few hours". Using orbital elements to calculate those distances agrees to actual averages to at least five significant figures. Formulas for computing position straight from orbital elements typically do not provide or need corrections for the effects of other planets.

For a higher level of accuracy the perturbations of planets are required. These are well known, and are believed to be modeled well enough to achieve high accuracy. These are all of the bodies that need to be considered for even many demanding problems. When Aldo Vitagliano calculated the date of close Martian approaches in the distant past or future, he tested the potential effect caused by the uncertainties of the asteroid belt models by running the simulations both with and without the biggest three asteroids, and found the effects were negligible.

Observations improved, and space age technology has replaced the older techniques. E. Myles Standish wrote: "Classical ephemerides over the past centuries have been based entirely upon optical observations:almost exclusively, meridian circle transit timings. With the advent of planetary radar, spacecraft missions, VLBI, etc., the situation for the four inner planets has changed dramatically." (8.5.1 page 10) For DE405, created in 1995, optical observations were dropped and as he wrote "initial conditions for the inner four planets were adjusted to ranging data primarily…" The error in DE405 is known to be about 2 km and is now sub-kilometer.

Although the perturbations on Mars by asteroids have caused problems, they have also been used to estimate the masses of certain asteroids. But improving the model of the asteroid belt is of great concern to those requiring or attempting to provide the highest-accuracy ephemerides.

== Orbital parameters ==
No more than five significant figures are presented in the following table of Mars's orbital elements. To this level of precision, the numbers match very well the VSOP87 elements and calculations derived from them, as well as Standish's (of JPL) 250-year best fit, and calculations using the actual positions of Mars over time.

Distances and eccentricity	(AU)	(million km)
Semimajor axis	1.5237	227.9
Perihelion	1.3814	206.7
Aphelion	1.6660	249.2
Average	1.5303	228.9
Circumference	9.553	1429
Closest approach to Earth	0.3727	55.76
Farthest distance from Earth	2.675	400.2
Eccentricity	0.0934	
Angles	(°)	
Inclination	1.850	
Period	(days)	(years)
Orbital	687.0	1.881
Synodic	779.9	2.135
Speed	(km/s)	
Average	24.1	
Maximum	26.5	
Minimum	22.0	
