= Martian Piloted Complex =

Mission by the Soviet Union to send six cosmonauts to Mars in the year 1975

The Martian Piloted Complex or MPK was a Soviet Union human mission to Mars proposed in 1956-62 by Mikhail Tikhonravov.

It featured a six-cosmonaut crew on a 900-day mission, with a launch in 1975. The craft would have a mass of 1,630 metric tons and employ traditional liquid propellants (LOX/Kerosene). It would take 25 N1 rocket launches to assemble the MPK in low earth orbit.

When complete, it would travel from Earth to Mars on a 270 day Hohmann trajectory and maneuver into Martian orbit. Afterwards, a landing craft would descend to the surface for a one-year expedition. Return to Earth would take 270 days and the re-entry vehicle would weigh 15 metric tons.

== See also ==
- Aelita project, a 1969 Soviet project of a human mission to Mars
- Human mission to Mars § Mission proposals
