= X Prize Cup =

Wirefly X Prize logo

The X Prize Cup is a two-day air and space exposition which was the result of a partnership between the X Prize Foundation and the State of New Mexico that began in 2004 when the Ansari X-Prize was held. This led to plans to build the world's first true rocket festival. Three X-Prize Cups have been held: in 2005, 2006 and 2007. Each X Prize Cup hosts different events and demonstrations, such as rocket-powered bicycles, rocket jet packs; but particularly notable are the Lunar Lander Challenge and the Space Elevator Games. 85,000 visitors attended the 2007 X Prize Cup. Although there was no X Prize Cup in 2009, there was a Lunar Lander Challenge.

== Motivation ==
A demonstration of the "rocket bike" at the 2006 Wirefly X Prize Cup

This X Prize was first proposed by Dr. Peter Diamandis in an address to the NSS International Space Development Conference in 1995. The notion of a competitive goal was adopted from the SpaceCub project, demonstration of a private vehicle capable of flying a pilot to the edge of space, defined as 100 km altitude. This goal was selected to help encourage the space industry in the private sector; so government funding to entries is not allowed. The X Prize Cup aimed to demonstrate that spaceflight can be affordable and accessible to corporations and civilians, opening the door to commercial spaceflight and space tourism. It is also hoped that competition will breed innovation to develop new low-cost methods of reaching Earth orbit. The X Prize Cup offers monetary rewards and organizational support to the community of aerospace professionals—and by staging Earth's great space exposition.

The X Prize was modeled after many prizes from the early 20th century that helped prod the development of air flight, including most notably the $25,000 Orteig Prize that spurred Charles Lindbergh to make his solo flight across the Atlantic Ocean. NASA is developing similar prize programs called Centennial Challenges to generate innovative solutions to space technology problems.

== 2004 Ansari X Prize ==
The original Ansari X Prize was a US$10,000,000 prize, offered by the X Prize Foundation, for the first non-government organization to launch a reusable crewed spacecraft into space twice within two weeks. It was modeled after early 20th-century aviation prizes, and aimed to spur development of low-cost spaceflight. The prize was won on October 4, 2004, the 47th anniversary of the Sputnik 1 launch, by the Tier One project using the experimental spaceplane SpaceShipOne.

The success and popularity of this event lead to the following events which were called the X-PRIZE Cup.

== 2006 Wirefly X Prize Cup ==
Dan Schlund, the Rocket Man at the 2006 Wirefly X Prize Cup

Wirefly was named the official title sponsor of the competition in 2006, and the event for that year was held on October 20–21 in Las Cruces, New Mexico, and represented an effort by the X Prize Foundation to continue encouraging innovation in the private sector. The 2006 Wirefly X Prize Cup focused on rocketry and lunar landing technology, offered up $2.5 million in prizes to teams competing in several distinct competitions related to the general theme. The exposition also featured high-powered rocket launches and exhibits intended to boost public interest in aerospace technology. In December 2006, the Cup's organizers announced expansion plans based on the success of the October event.

With the success of the original X Prize competition, the open competitions for $2.5 million in monetary prizes were the highlight of the 2006 Wirefly X Prize Cup. The aerospace teams in Las Cruces fought for the top prize in three events—the Lunar Lander Challenge, the Vertical Rocket Challenge, and the Space Elevator Games.

In addition to the featured competitions, the Wirefly X Prize Cup included a series of rocketry exhibitions and educational presentations. "Rocketman" Dan Schlund demonstrated his "Rocketbelt," a device which allows him to soar above the earth with a rocket strapped to his back. The Rocket Racing League debuted the Mark-1 X-Racer, a preview of next-generation motor sports. Other attractions included high-powered rocket launches, a student competition, a symposium on personal spaceflight, and an assortment of ground displays and simulators.

== 2007 X Prize Cup ==
The 2007 X Prize Cup, was held at Holloman Air Force Base in Alamogordo, NM, on October 26–28. The 2007 X Prize Cup also marked the rebirth of the Teacher in Space Project, when the Space Frontier Foundation and the United States Rocket Academy announced the competition rules and begin accepting applications for the first Teacher in Space "pathfinder". Aircraft as well as rockets were featured at the event, along with the Lunar Lander Challenge. 85,000 people attended the event.

The Armadillo Aerospace team successfully completed the first of two legs of the $350,000 prize Level 1 Lunar Lander Challenge on 27 October 2007 by completing a flight above 50 m altitude and moving horizontally to a second pad for landing after more than 90 seconds of flight time. The prize was not claimed in 2007 as the rocket engine experienced a hard start on the second leg return flight, resulting in a cracked engine, excessive loss of fuel, and an inability to remain in the air for the full 90 seconds required. No other competitor was able to achieve even a successful first leg of the competition.

== Northrop Grumman Lunar Lander Challenge ==
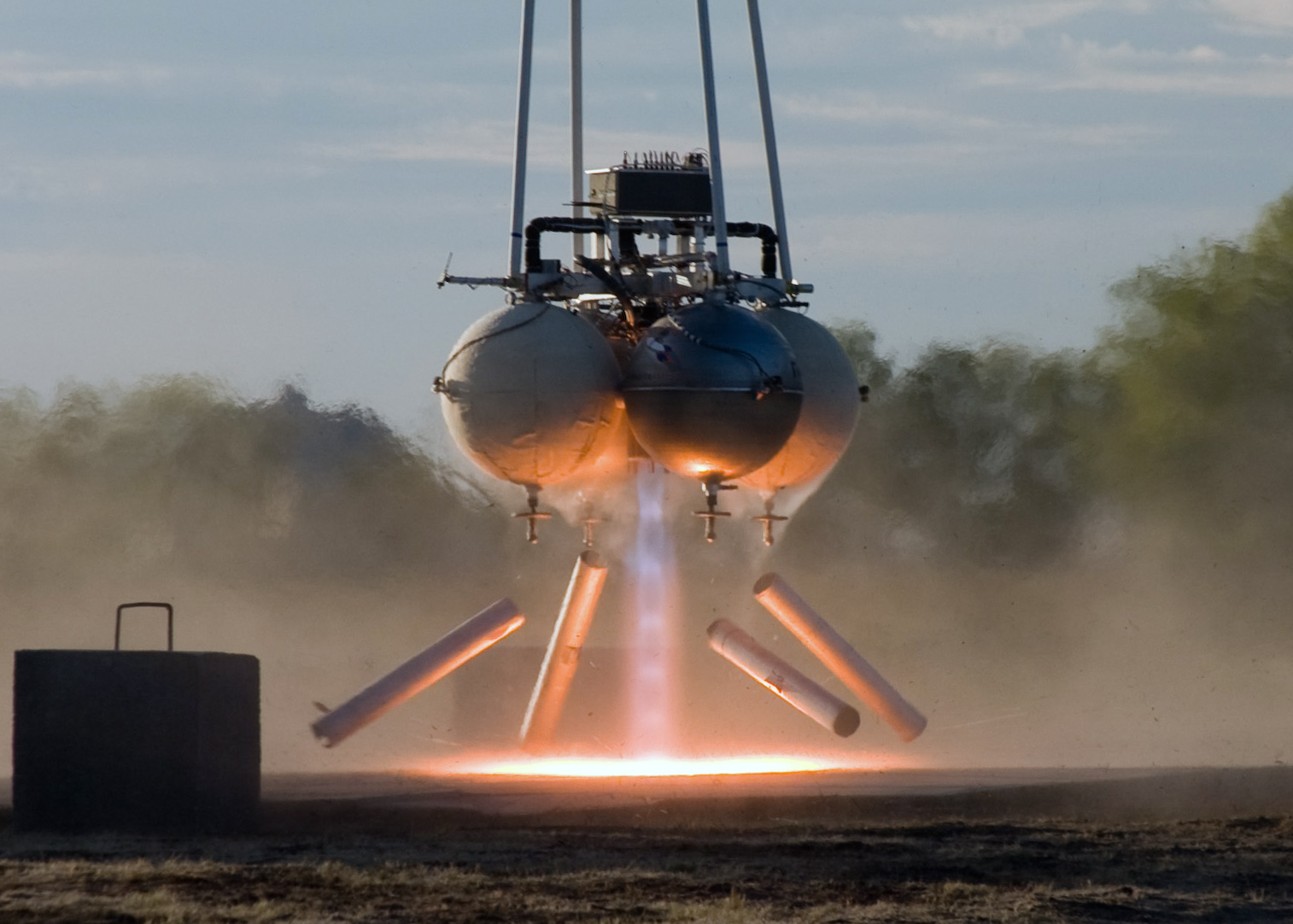
Armadillo's "Pixel" in test flights before the 2006 competition

The Northrop Grumman Lunar Lander Challenge (NG-LLC) is intended to accelerate the commercial development of a vehicle capable of launching from the surface of the Moon to lunar orbit and back. The competition is part of NASA's Centennial Challenges program. Such a vehicle would have direct application to NASA's space exploration goals as well as the personal spaceflight industry. The prize may also help the industry build new vehicles and develop the operational capacity to operate quick turnaround vertical take-off, vertical landing vehicles.

To win, the team's rocket must take-off vertically, climb at least 50 meters above the pad, fly for a minimum amount of time and land on a target that is 100 meters from the takeoff point. The team can then refuel the rocket, which must then fly back to the original pad. There are two levels to the competition. In Level 1 the vehicle must be in the air on each leg for 90 seconds. A $350,000 prize is given to the first successful team, and $150,000 to the second. In Level 2 the vehicle must be in the air on each leg for 180 seconds to win the $1 million prize.

== Space Elevator Games ==
In 2006, the Space Elevator Games took place at the Wirefly X Prize Cup. A space elevator is a theoretical system using a super-strong ribbon going from the surface of the Earth to a point beyond geosynchronous orbit. The ribbon is held in place by a counterweight in orbit. As the Earth rotates, the ribbon is held taut. Vehicles would climb the ribbon powered by a beam of energy projected from the surface of the Earth. Building a space elevator requires materials and techniques that do not currently exist. The Space Elevator Games are meant to stimulate the development of such materials and techniques.

The games are divided into two categories: the Power Beam Challenge and the Tether Challenge. In the Power Beam Challenge, each team designs and builds a climber (a machine capable of traveling up and down a tether ribbon). The climber must carry a payload. Power will be beamed from a transmitter to a receiver on the climber. Each climber must travel to a height of 50 meters traveling a minimum speed of 1 meter per second. The Tether Challenge is to help develop very strong tether material for use in various structural applications.

The 2007 Space Elevator Games were not held at the Wirefly X Prize Cup. Instead, they took place in Salt Lake City.

== Pete Conrad Spirit Award ==
The Pete Conrad Spirit Award, instituted in 2007 and named for American astronaut Pete Conrad, is given to students between the ages of 13 and 18 that develop a new concept to benefit the personal spaceflight industry. This award was presented to the finalists at the 2007 X Prize Cup.

== See also ==
- Automotive X Prize
- List of challenge awards
- List of awards named after people
- America's Space Prize
- Methuselah Mouse Prize, or M Prize (modeled after the Ansari X Prize)
- SpaceShipOne

Related technical topics:

- Specific impulse
- Tsiolkovsky equation
- Delta V
