= America's Space Prize =

Award

The America's Space Prize Logo

America's Space Prize was a US$50 million space competition in orbital spaceflight established and funded in 2004 by hotel entrepreneur Robert Bigelow. The prize would have been awarded to the first US-based privately funded team to design and build a reusable crewed capsule capable of flying 5 astronauts to a Bigelow Aerospace inflatable space module. The criteria also required the capsule be recovered and flown again in 60 days. The prize expired January 10, 2010, without a winner or any test flights attempted. The teams were required to have been based in the United States.

== History ==
The prize was announced by Bigelow on 17 December 2003—the 100th anniversary of the Wright brothers first powered aircraft flight.

== Prize rules ==
A set of ten criteria were set up in order for a contestant to win the prize.

1. The spacecraft must reach a minimum altitude of 400 kilometers (approximately 250 miles);
2. The spacecraft must reach a minimum velocity sufficient to complete two full orbits at altitude before returning to Earth;
3. The spacecraft must carry no less than a crew of five people;
4. The spacecraft must dock or demonstrate its ability to dock with a Bigelow Aerospace inflatable space habitat, and be capable of remaining on station at least six months;
5. The spacecraft must perform two consecutive, safe and successful orbital missions within a period of sixty calendar days, subject to Government regulations;
6. No more than twenty percent (20%) of the spacecraft may be composed of expendable hardware;
7. The contestant must be domiciled in the United States of America.
8. The contestant must have its principal place of business in the United States of America;
9. The Competitor must not accept or utilize government development funding related to this contest of any kind, nor shall there be any government ownership of the competitor. Use in government test facilities shall be permitted; and
10. The spacecraft must complete its two missions safely and successfully, with all five crew members aboard for the second qualifying flight, before the competition's deadline of Jan. 10, 2010

== Contestants ==
Since the launch of the prize, 40 companies had expressed interest, but either did not have the money which would apparently be needed, or, in the case of SpaceX, were ineligible due to having accepted government funding. Despite the lack of interest, Bigelow did not revise the prize rules, planning instead to seek transportation to space other ways.

A few contestants have been:

- Interorbital Systems
- JP Aerospace
- SpaceDev
- SpaceX

== See also ==
- Orteig Prize
- Ansari X Prize
- Mprize
- N-prize
- List of space technology awards
