= SpaceShipOne flight 17P =

Final spaceflight in the Tier One program

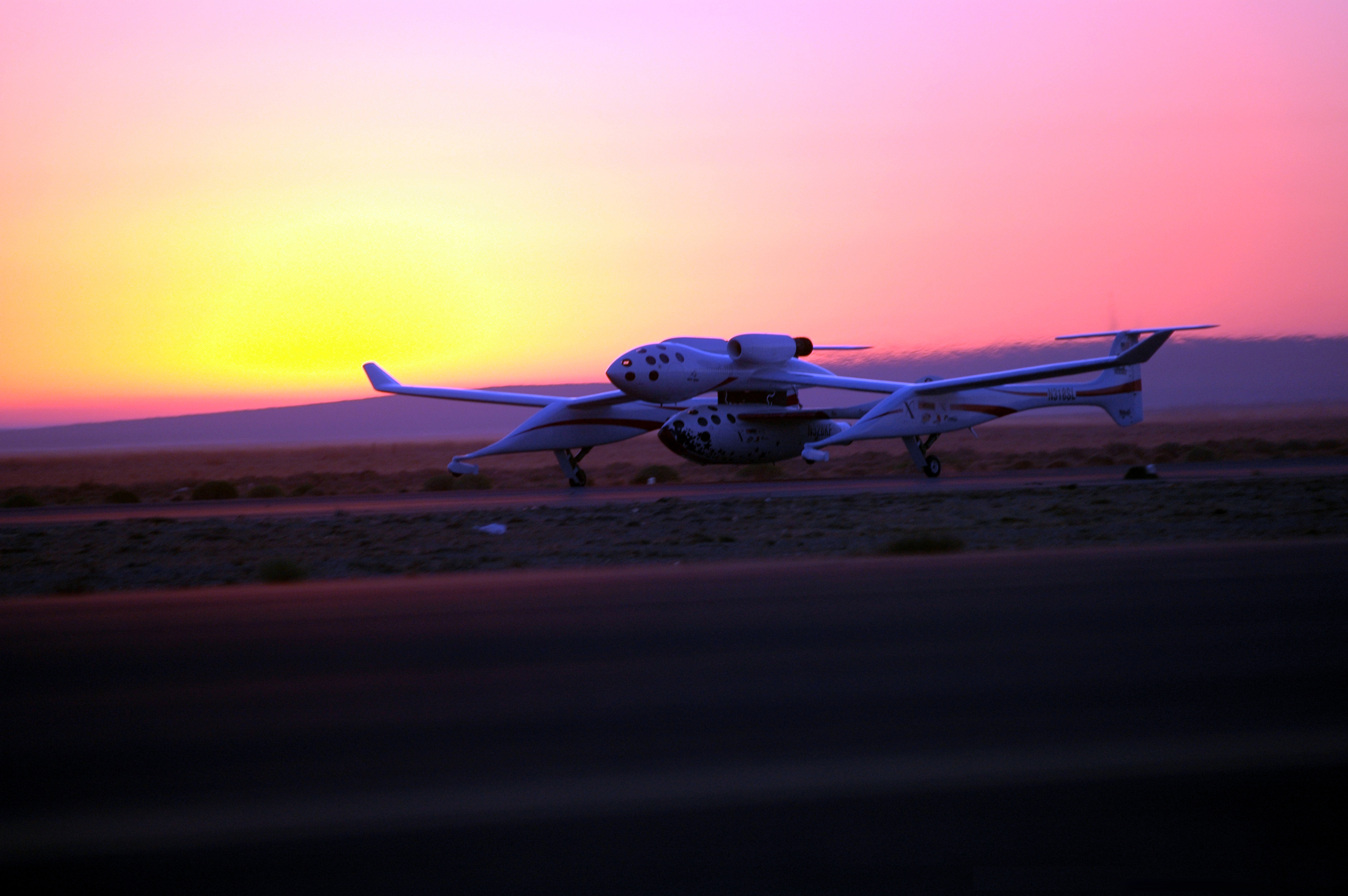
- Mission type: Test flight
- Operator: Scaled Composites
- Mission duration: 24 minutes
- Apogee: 112.01 kilometers (69.60 mi)

Spacecraft properties
- Spacecraft: SpaceShipOne
- Manufacturer: Scaled Composites

Crew
- Crew size: 1
- Members: Brian Binnie

Start of mission
- Launch date: October 4, 2004, 14:49 UTC
- Launch site: White Knight, Mojave

End of mission
- Landing date: October 4, 2004, 15:13 UTC
- Landing site: Mojave

Flight 17P of SpaceShipOne was a spaceflight in the Tier One program that took place on October 4, 2004. It was the second competitive flight in the Ansari X Prize competition to demonstrate a non-governmental reusable crewed spacecraft, and is hence also referred to as the X2 flight. It was a successful flight, winning the X PRIZE. As of August 2026 this is the last solo spaceflight in history.

== Crew ==
Position	Astronaut
Pilot	Brian Binnie; Only spaceflight

== Scheduling ==
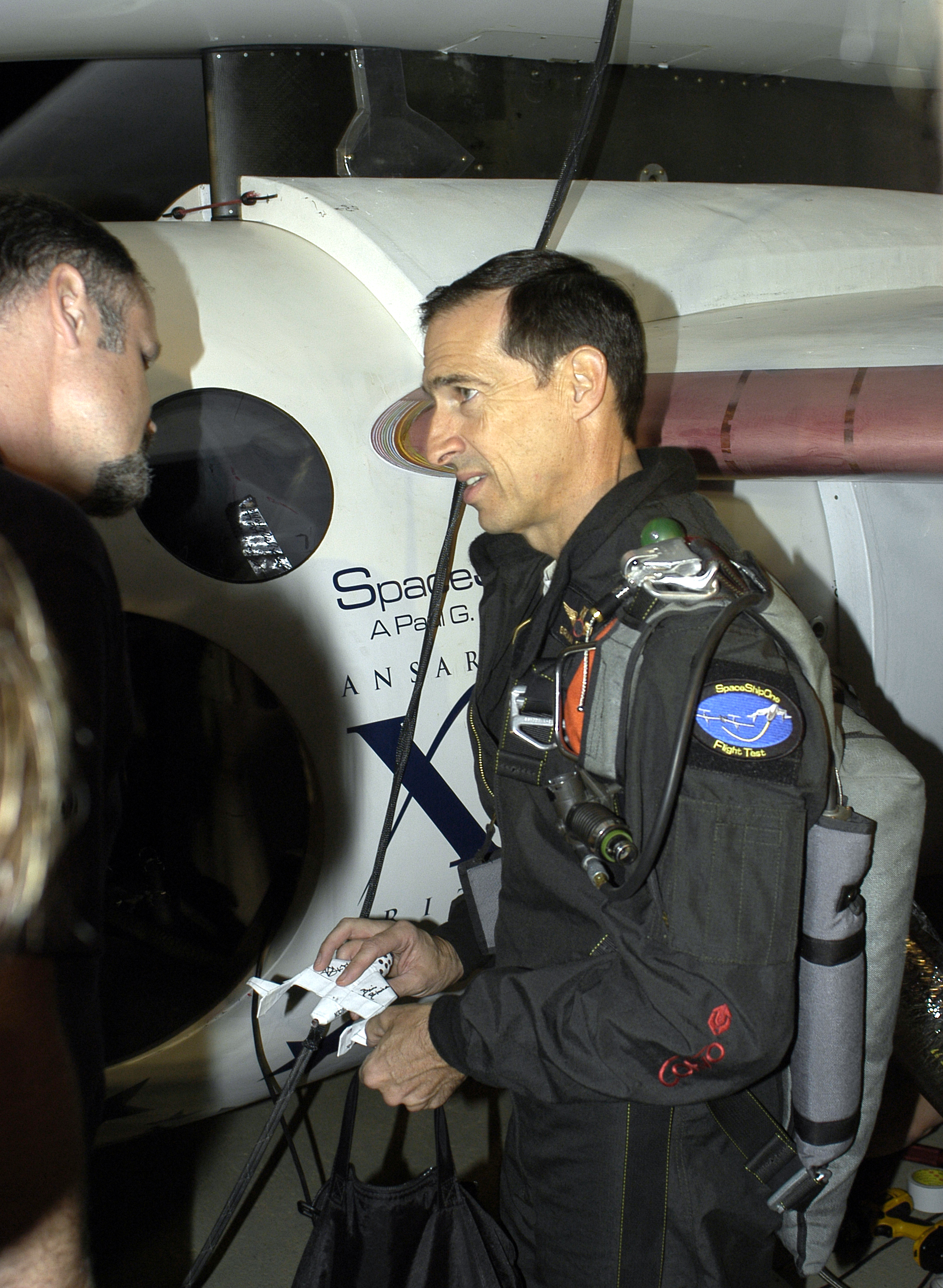
Brian Binnie flight preflight before the final SpaceShipOne flight 17P

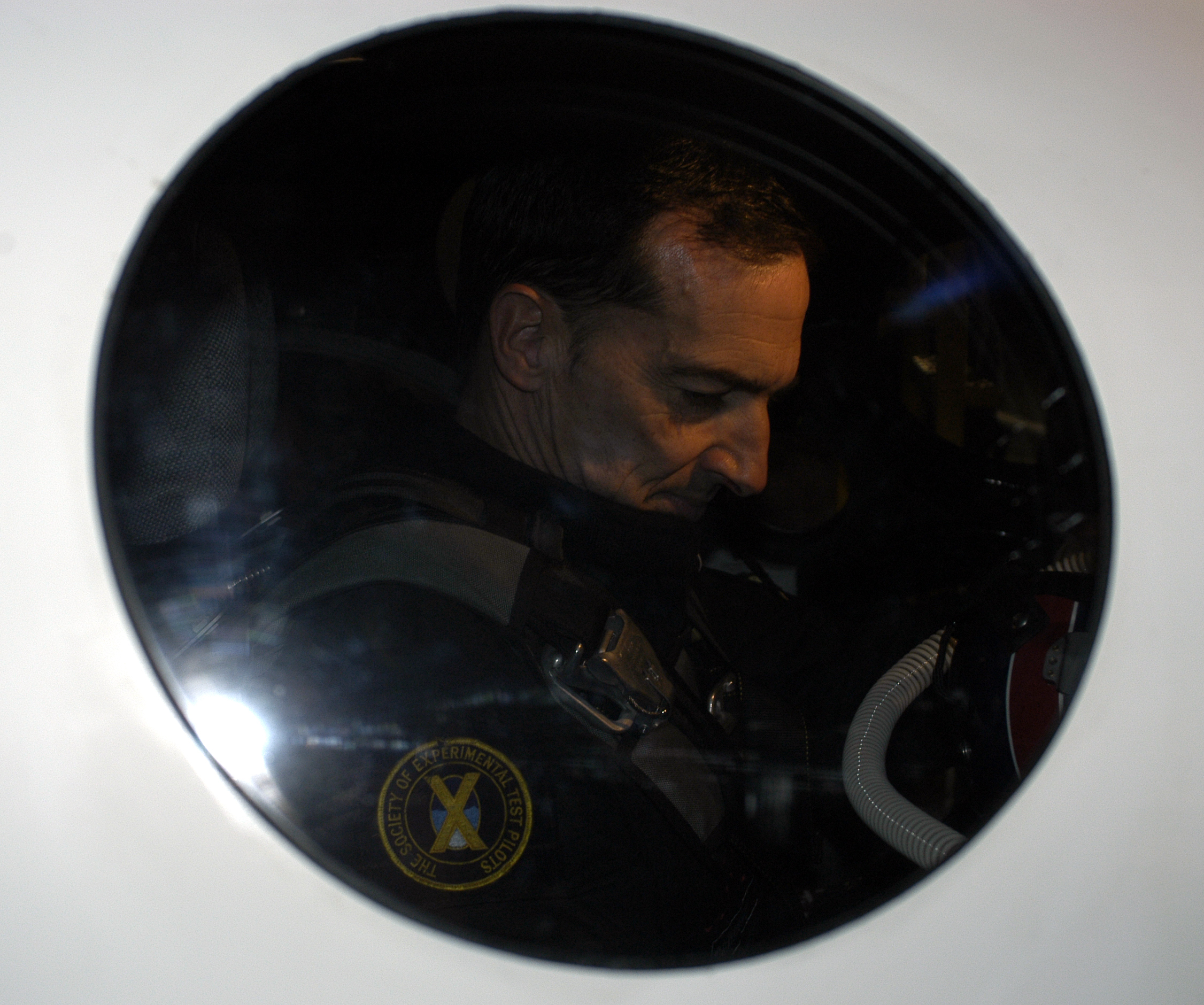
Brian Binnie runs his Prelaunch Checklist inside SpaceShipOne flight 17P

To win the X PRIZE, a spacecraft needed to make two successful competitive flights within 14 days. SpaceShipOne made a successful competitive flight on September 29, 2004, and so needed to make a second by October 13, 2004, in order to win. Scaled Composites aimed to be able to fly three times within the two weeks in order to allow for a failed flight.

The date of the flight, October 4, 2004, was the 47th anniversary of the launch of Sputnik 1, the first artificial satellite to orbit the Earth and the same day astronaut Gordon Cooper died. SpaceShipOne's first powered flight was, in a similar vein, on the 100th anniversary of the first ever powered flight by the Wright Brothers.

The da Vinci Project, another X PRIZE contender, planned to make its first competitive flight on October 2, 2004, which might have caused a race to develop, affecting the scheduling. However, they encountered problems and had to delay their flights. Tier One was therefore able to follow their original flight schedule. Scaled Composites reported that they could have turned the spacecraft around faster than the five days they actually allowed for it.

It was anticipated by observers that Mike Melvill, the pilot on both previous spaceflights by SpaceShipOne, would pilot this flight also. This expectation was not supported by any real evidence, but was based on Melvill's prior experience. On the morning of the flight it was announced that Brian Binnie would be the pilot.

== Manifest ==
Under Ansari X PRIZE rules, the flight was required to carry 180 kg payload, to simulate two 90 kg human passengers. Whereas Scaled Composites stated that the first competitive flight would not carry passengers, it did not make any such statement about later competitive flights. It seemed possible that Burt Rutan would be a passenger on flight 17P, but in the end he was not, since the FAA had restricted the flight to just the pilot and no passengers. The payload included:

- X PRIZE flight monitoring equipment, known as the "gold box"
- the Explorers Club flag, by arrangement between the Explorers Club and the X PRIZE Foundation

The same logos were carried as on flight 16P:

- Scaled Composites
- "SpaceShipOne: a Paul G. Allen project" on SpaceShipOne
- "White Knight" on White Knight
- Virgin Galactic, on the tails
- Virgin, on the fuselage
- Ansari X PRIZE, as required by X PRIZE rules
- The Spirit of St. Louis, a science center
- M&M's
- 7-Up Plus
- Champ Car World Series

== Flight profile ==
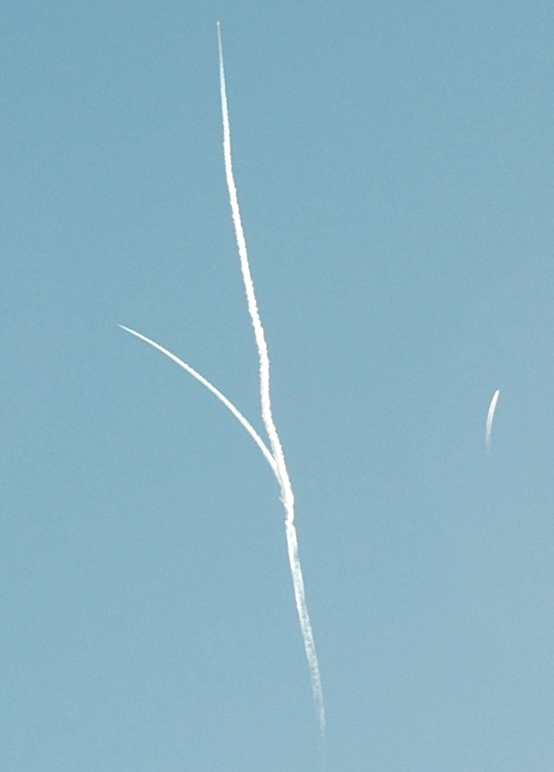
Launch of the Rockets on SpaceShipOne

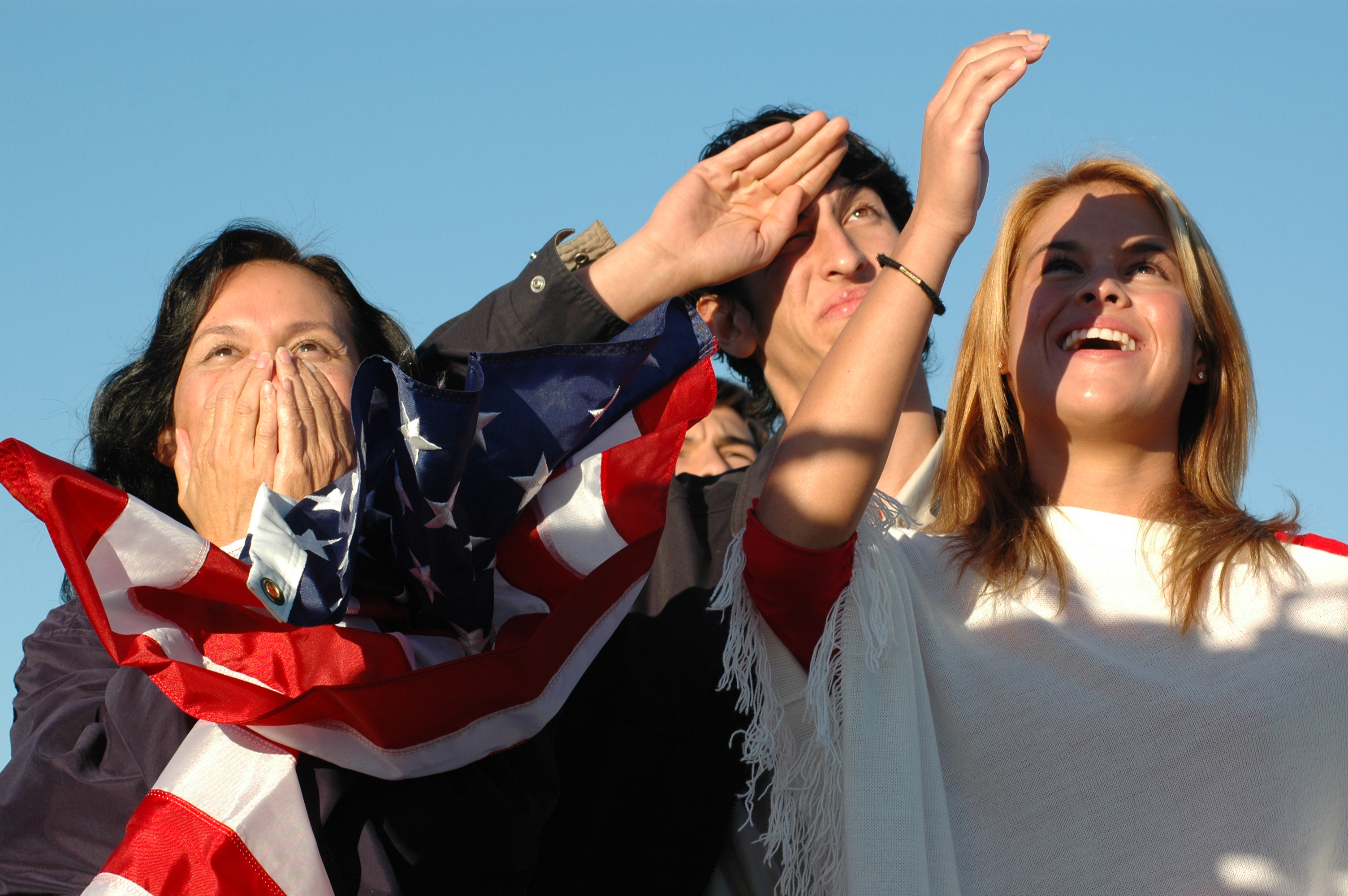
Family of Brian Binnie react as he launches into Space on the final SpaceShipOne Flight 17P

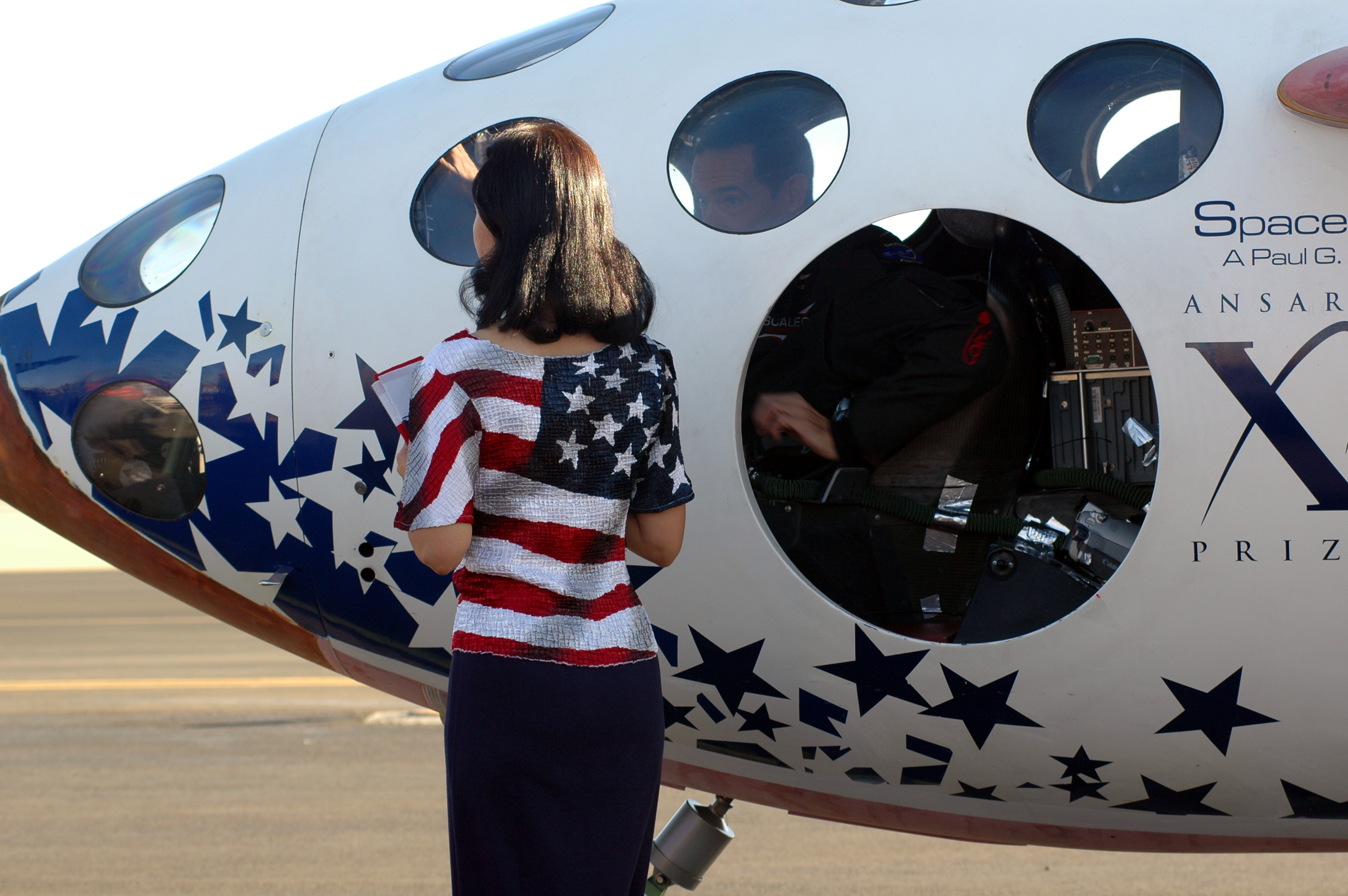
Wife of astronaut Brian Binnie greets him upon completion of the final flight

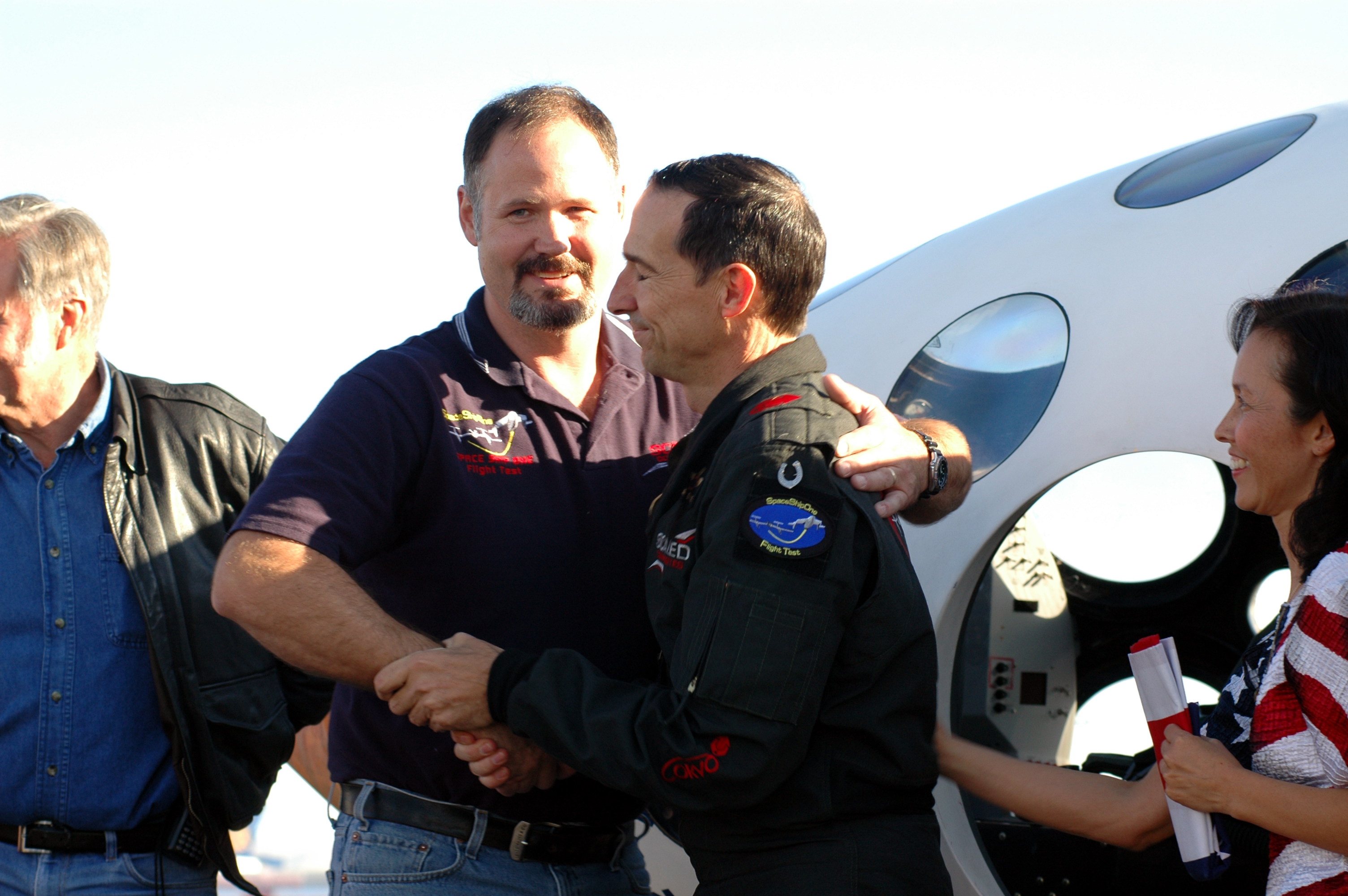
Brian Binnie moments after returning to earth in SpaceShipOne's final mission 17P

All times are in PDT, which is seven hours behind UTC. This was the local civil time at the spaceport on the day of the flight.

The SpaceShipOne pilot was Brian Binnie. White Knight was piloted by Mike Melvill.

Taxiing, scheduled for 06:30, began at 06:36. Takeoff from Mojave Spaceport, scheduled for 07:00, took place at 06:49. White Knight then carried SpaceShipOne to the launch altitude, in excess of 43,500 feet (13.3 km). SpaceShipOne separated from White Knight at 07:49, and promptly ignited its rocket.

The rocket motor was capable of burning for approximately 87 s. The burn-out altitude was in excess of 200,000 feet (61 km). After burn-out the craft continued to coast upwards. The wing was feathered, into high-drag configuration, during the coasting phase. The spacecraft coasted to apogee at an altitude of 112.01 kilometers (367,500 ft), well in excess of the X PRIZE target altitude. It also broke the record altitude of 354,200 feet (107.96 km) for a rocket plane, set by the X-15 in 1963.

After apogee, SpaceShipOne reentered the atmosphere in its feathered configuration, and then changed to gliding configuration at 07:57. SpaceShipOne then glided back to the spaceport, deployed landing gear at 4,200 feet (1.28 km), and landed safely at 08:13. White Knight then landed at 08:19.

== Spectacle ==
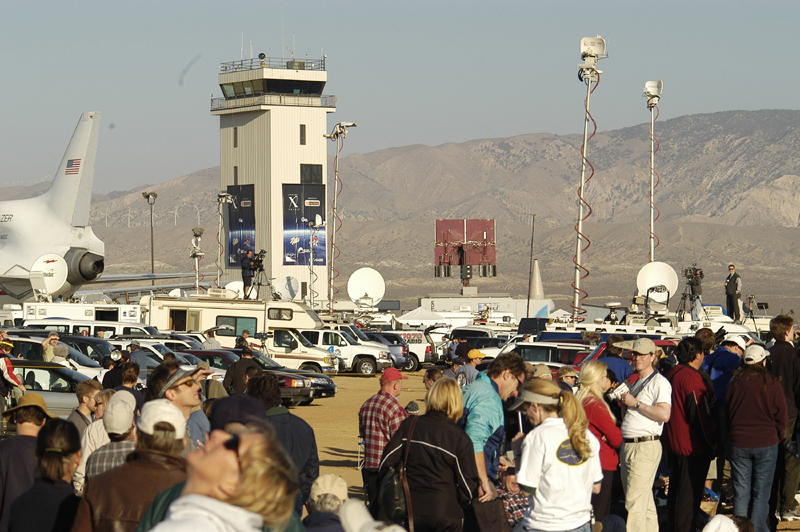
SpaceShipOne Camp Mojave Mission 17P

As with SpaceShipOne's previous spaceflights, a large crowd watched from Mojave Spaceport. There was also live television coverage, and various websites provided coverage in their medium of preference.

Distinguished attendees included:

- Richard Branson, of Virgin Galactic
- Paul Allen, of Mojave Aerospace Ventures
- Rick Searfoss, chief X PRIZE judge
- Jerry Pournelle, science fiction author

== X PRIZE ==
The Ansari X PRIZE requires that two spaceflights be made by the same spacecraft within two weeks. SpaceShipOne successfully made its first competitive flight (flight 16P) on September 29, 2004. This second successful competitive flight therefore won the X PRIZE. This was declared by Rick Searfoss, the chief X PRIZE judge, at a post-flight press briefing. The prize was awarded on November 6, 2004.

== Retirement ==
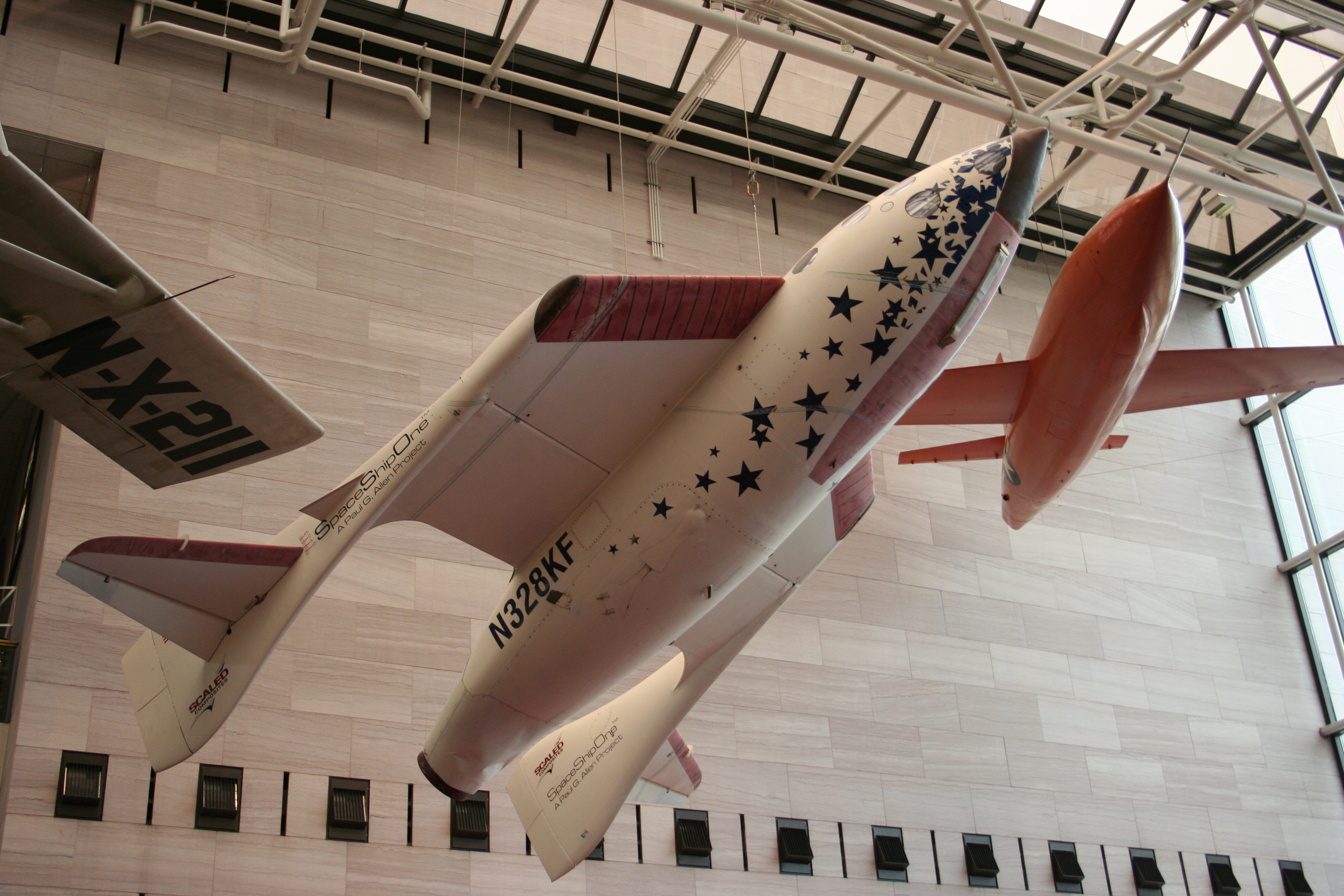
SpaceShipOne now hangs in the National Air and Space Museum in Washington D.C.

On July 25, 2005, SpaceShipOne was taken to the Oshkosh Airshow in Oshkosh, Wisconsin. After the airshow, Mike Melvill and crew flew the White Knight, carrying SpaceShipOne, to Wright-Patterson Air Force Base in Dayton, Ohio, where Melvill spoke to a group of about 300 military and civilian personnel. Later in the evening, Melvill gave a presentation at the Dayton Engineers Club, entitled "Some Experiments in Space Flight," in honor of Wilbur Wright's now-famous presentation to the American Society of Mechanical Engineers in 1901 entitled "Some Experiments in Flight." The White Knight then transported SpaceShipOne to the Smithsonian Institution's National Air and Space Museum to be put on display. It was unveiled on Wednesday October 5, 2005 in the Milestones of Flight gallery and is now on display to the public in the main atrium with the Spirit of St. Louis, the Bell X-1, the Wright Flyer, and the Apollo 11 command module Columbia.

Commander Brian Binnie donated the flight suit worn during his Ansari X Prize-winning flight to an auction benefiting Seattle's Museum of Flight. Entertainer and charity auctioneer Fred Northup, Jr. purchased the flight suit, and it is on loan and displayed at the museum's new Charles Simonyi Space Gallery.
