= Space Fellowship =

International space industry news network

- Type: Private
- Industry: Aerospace and News
- Founded: 2003
- Headquarters: Exmouth, UK,
- Key people: Sigurd De Keyser; Matthias De Keyser; Robert Goldsmith; Klaus Schmidt
- Website: www.SpaceFellowship.com

The Space Fellowship is an international news and information network dedicated to the development of the space industry.

The organisation works to report and communicate space news and information to its community. The International Space Fellowship works alongside leading space organisations with the goal of bringing space to the general public. Its online news service provides visitors with the news and updates from both inside and outside the space community.

== History ==
In the early days the Space Fellowship was the Official X PRIZE Foundation web forum and a separate X PRIZE blog on Google's blogspot. On 12 July 2004 the X PRIZE Foundation web forum and the X PRIZE blog spot joined to form the X PRIZE News. On 18 October 2005 the X PRIZE News was renamed to the International Space Fellowship.

== Members ==
Aerospace companies / Teams and prizes having their official forums listed on the Space Fellowship are:

- Armadillo Aerospace
- JP Aerospace
- Micro-Space
- Masten Space Systems
- Interorbital Systems
- Microlaunchers
- Cambridge University Spaceflight
- Epsilon vee
- Team Prometheus
- N-Prize

== See also ==
- Space advocacy
