= Space Transport Corporation =

Space Transport Corporation (STC) was a company based in Forks, Washington whose goal was to commercialize space. The company was founded in 2002 by Eric Meier and Philip Storm. The company planned to provide small payload launch and space tourism services. The company liquidated its assets in February 2005 and was completely defunct by late 2006.

== STC vehicles ==
=== Spartan ===
The Spartan Three Stage Rocket was a vehicle intended to carry payloads of 1 to 5 kg into suborbit. The rocket was tested to 80 km, and commercial launches were planned for 2005.

=== Nano-Satellite Orbital Launch Vehicle ===
The Nano-Satellite Orbital Launch Vehicle, or N-SOLV, was a vehicle designed to carry a 10 kg payload to orbit. The corporation planned to sell the launch service for under a million United States dollars. The vehicle's intended payload was nano-satellites.

=== Rubicon I ===
Rubicon I was a test vehicle designed to carry 270 kg (or three people) to 100 km for under $200,000. The vehicle was destroyed in August 2004 during a launch test due to a propellant formulation error. Rubicon I, launched by Space Transport Corporation of Forks, Washington, was the only other Ansari X Prize entrant to launch during the entire duration of the prize with the exception of Paul Allen and Burt Rutan's winning SpaceShipOne. ABC Nightline featured both the Rubicon I developers and SpaceShipOne's winning team in its 2004 presentation of the Ansari X Prize.

=== Rubicon II ===
The Rubicon II was the replacement to Rubicon I. The design was identical to the Rubicon I, except for a few error fixes. As of November 22, 2004, work on the Rubicon II had ceased in favor of the Spartan.

== See also ==
- List of private spaceflight companies - A compiled list of private spaceflight companies
- Ansari X Prize - Ansari X Prize
- Space Fellowship - Hosts the official Masten Space Systems Forum
