= SpaceShipOne flight 16P =

2004 private crewed sub-orbital spaceflight

Flight 16P
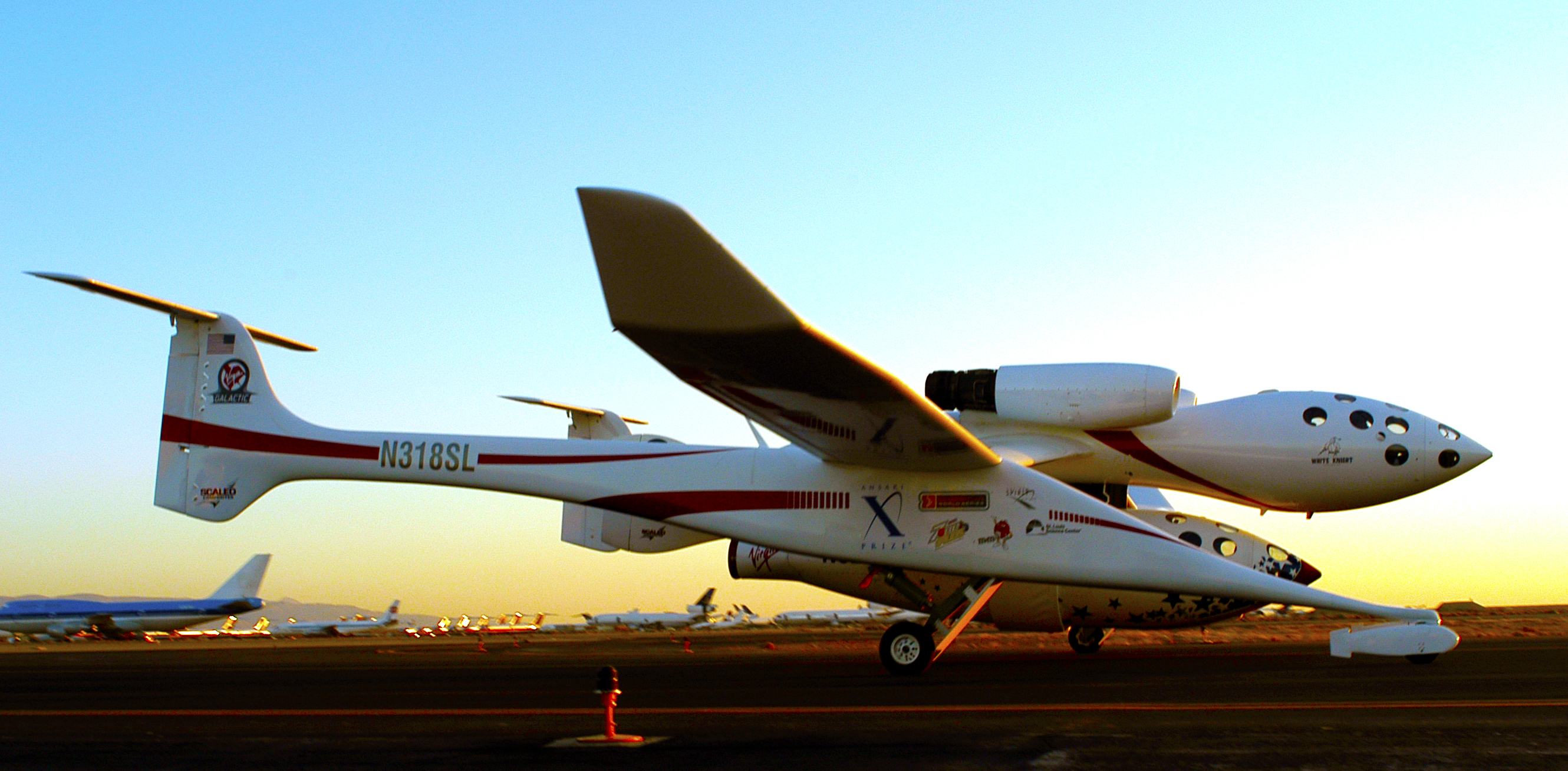
- Mission type: Ansari X-Prize entry
- Operator: Scaled Composites
- Mission duration: 25 minutes
- Apogee: 102.9 kilometers (63.9 mi)

Spacecraft properties
- Spacecraft: SpaceShipOne
- Manufacturer: Scaled Composites

Crew
- Crew size: 1
- Members: Mike Melvill
- Callsign: SpaceShipOne

Start of mission
- Launch date: September 29, 2004, 15:09 UTC
- Launch site: White Knight, Mojave

End of mission
- Landing date: September 29, 2004, 15:34 UTC
- Landing site: Mojave
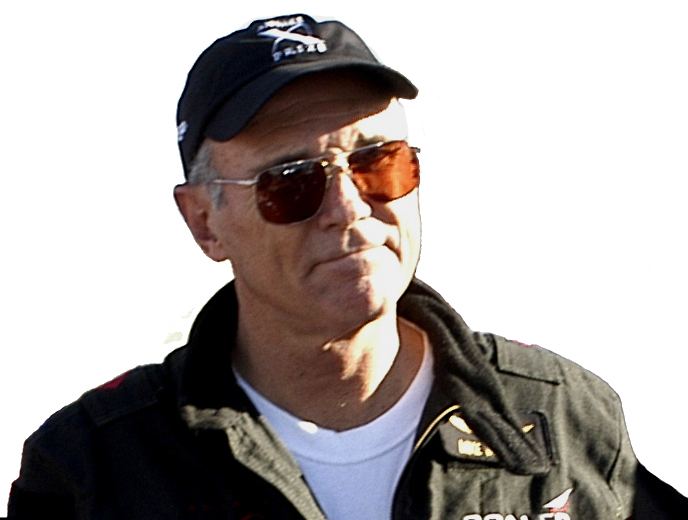
- Scaled Composites Tier One

Flight 16P of SpaceShipOne was a spaceflight in the Tier One program that took place on September 29, 2004. It was the first competitive flight in the Ansari X PRIZE competition to demonstrate a non-governmental reusable crewed spacecraft, and is hence also referred to as the X1 flight. A serious roll excursion occurred during boost, so the flight did not achieve the expected altitude. However, it exceeded 100 km altitude, making it a successful X PRIZE flight.

== Scheduling ==
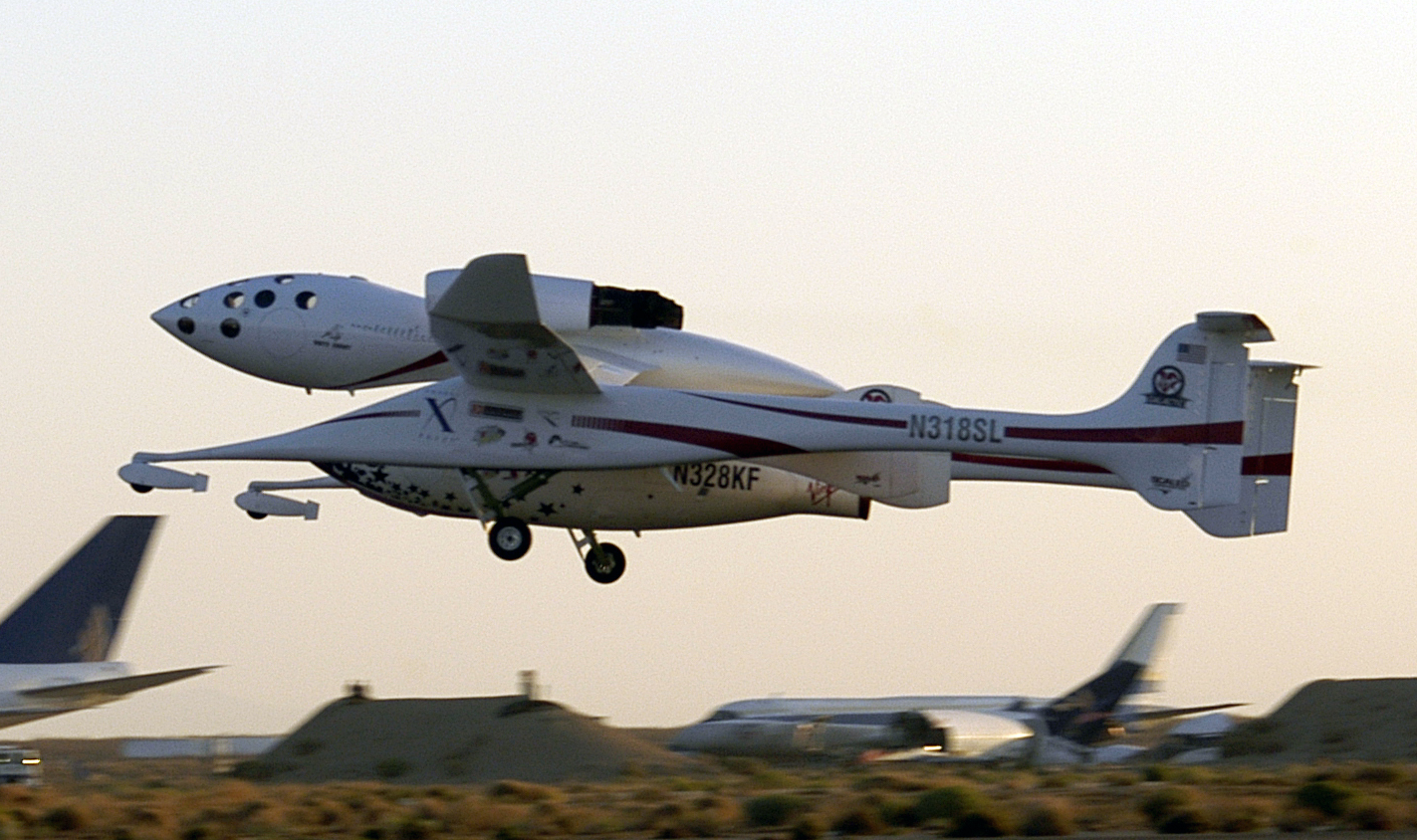
SpaceShipOne takes off

X PRIZE rules required that the date and place of competitive flights be announced to the X PRIZE Foundation at least 60 days before the flight. Due to problems encountered during flight 15P on June 21, 2004, Scaled Composites did not immediately set a date for their competitive flights, suspecting that another test flight might be required. By July 7, 2004 Burt Rutan reported that the faults had been resolved and the next flights would be competitive. On July 27, 2004, the X PRIZE Foundation announced that Scaled Composites had given notice that they would make their first competitive flight on September 29, 2004.

The pilot initially selected for the flight withdrew due to stress about two weeks before the flight, after his wife gave birth and he also fell ill. Mike Melvill, who also piloted SpaceShipOne's sole previous spaceflight, stepped in to fly in his place. The choice of pilot was not publicly announced until about two hours before planned takeoff. Melvill was seen as a surprise choice, because after the previous flight he had said he wanted to take a break from flying SpaceShipOne and ride his motorbike more.

== Manifest ==
Under Ansari X PRIZE rules, the flight was required to carry 180 kg payload, to simulate two 90 kg human passengers. Scaled Composites announced early on that this, their first X PRIZE flight, would carry inanimate payload rather than live passengers. The payload included:

- X PRIZE flight monitoring equipment, known as the "gold box"
- the Explorers Club flag, by arrangement between the Explorers Club and the X PRIZE Foundation
- video equipment, producing a video stream that was broadcast live
- mementos from team members, including:
  - photographs
  - personal tools, including Burt Rutan's college slide rule
  - tree seedlings
  - the ashes of Burt Rutan's mother, Irene Rutan, who had died a few years earlier
  - an heirloom watch
  - a copy of Charles Lindbergh's book The Spirit of St. Louis
- a teddy bear being carried for the British charity Great North Air Ambulance
- lead ballast to make up the payload mass

The practice of carrying arbitrary non-functional items into space, which has previously been carried out by many Space Shuttle missions, is evidence that space travel is still widely seen as special. The value of symbolic items increases enormously if the item has flown in space, due to the restricted access to space. The teddy bear being carried for charity will be auctioned at a much higher price than it would otherwise command. Scaled Composites employees were made to sign a contract forbidding them from selling the mementos they put on the flight.

SpaceShipOne and White Knight bore several logos for the flight. These were:

- Scaled Composites
- "SpaceShipOne: a Paul G. Allen project" on SpaceShipOne
- "White Knight" on White Knight
- Virgin Galactic, on the tails, following the signing earlier in the week of an agreement for Virgin Galactic to license Tier One technology for space tourism
- Virgin, on the fuselage
- Ansari X PRIZE, as required by X PRIZE rules
- The Spirit of St. Louis, a science center
- M&M's, apparently in an act of sponsorship inspired by Melvill's antics with M&M's during flight 15P
- 7-Up Plus
- Champ Car World Series

== Crew ==
Position	Astronaut
Pilot	Mike Melvill; Second and final spaceflight

== Flight profile ==
The SpaceShipOne pilot was Mike Melvill. There were three chase planes.

All times are in PDT, which is seven hours behind UTC. This was the local civil time at the spaceport on the day of the flight. All measurements are first stated in the U.S. customary units in which they were originally reported, with conversions to SI units also given.

The flight was planned to take off from Mojave Spaceport in the early morning, when wind conditions are most favourable. Takeoff was scheduled for 06:47, but was delayed because of winds gusting to 50 mph (20 m/s), which subsided after sunrise. White Knight, carrying SpaceShipOne, taxied to the runway at 07:00, and took off at 07:11.

After takeoff, White Knight and SpaceShipOne ascended to the launch altitude, planned to be around 14 km. At 08:09 SpaceShipOne was released, glided for 6 s, then went into nose-up attitude and the rocket motor was ignited. The rocket motor was capable of burning for approximately 87 s, having been upgraded since the previous flight. It was planned to shut off the motor at an altitude of 345,000 feet (105 km), presumably to avoid pushing the envelope too far.

The spacecraft started rolling rapidly 50 s into the burn, while travelling at Mach 2.7. This was probably due to, or at least exacerbated by, pilot error. The pilot was not highly concerned by this, being confident that he could correct the situation, and he allowed the burn to continue during the roll. He later said "I thought it was kind of cool." The altitude was too high (and thus the atmosphere too thin) for the roll to cause significant aerodynamic stress, and it was correspondingly infeasible to damp the roll rate using the aerodynamic control surfaces.

When there was sufficient velocity to assure the achievement of the target altitude, as predicted by the navigational system, the ground controllers recommended that the pilot abort the burn. He promptly did so, 76 s into the burn, cutting it short by 11 s. After engine cutoff, the craft continued climbing while rolling. The pilot did not immediately work to damp the roll. Around apogee he took photographs of the Earth using a digital still camera.

The apogee altitude was estimated by the nearby Edwards Air Force Base, based on radar data, to be 337,569 feet (102.9 km). Due to the early burn cutoff, this was far less than originally anticipated. However, it was more than the 100 km necessary to qualify as a spaceflight and satisfy X PRIZE requirements. Early reports said that after the instruction from the ground the pilot had delayed the burn cutoff in order to exceed 100 km; in fact the instruction was issued just after the 100 km altitude was assured, and the pilot's reaction time accounts for the additional 2.9 km.

After apogee, the pilot feathered the wing for atmospheric reentry. He then damped out the roll, without difficulty, using the reaction jets. Overall, the craft did 29 complete rolls. Atmospheric reentry proceeded normally, with the craft rapidly righting its attitude due to the stable high-drag configuration. It changed back to gliding configuration normally, glided back to the spaceport, and landed safely at 08:34. White Knight then landed at 08:39.

== Spectacle ==
As with SpaceShipOne's previous flight, a crowd of thousands watched from Mojave Spaceport. Television coverage also occurred. SPACE.com provided live video from SpaceShipOne's cockpit.

Distinguished attendees included:

- Sean O'Keefe, NASA Administrator
- Erik Lindbergh, grandson of the pioneering aviator Charles Lindbergh and a member of the X PRIZE Foundation board
- James Cameron, action film director
- John Landis, film director
- William Readdy, astronaut

At 06:09, shortly before planned takeoff, spectators were told to stay at the spaceport after the flight, to hear a "major announcement" about the future of the X PRIZE Foundation. As of October 4, 2004, it appears that no such announcement was actually made.

Spectator reaction was more muted than for SpaceShipOne flight 15P, the first SpaceShipOne flight to have spectators, which was also the first privately funded human spaceflight.

== Later flights ==
To win the X PRIZE, a spacecraft must make two successful competitive flights within 14 days. With this flight on September 29, 2004, successful, a second spaceflight had to follow by October 13, 2004, in order to win.

Scaled Composites scheduled the second competitive flight, flight 17P, for October 4, 2004, the 47th anniversary of the launch of Sputnik 1, and it was completed successfully on schedule. There was a possibility of a third competitive flight (18P) occurring by October 13, 2004, if either of the first two flights failed, but in the end this was not required.

The da Vinci Project, another X PRIZE contender, planned to make its first competitive flight on October 2, 2004, but encountered problems and had to delay its flights.
