= List of space technology awards =

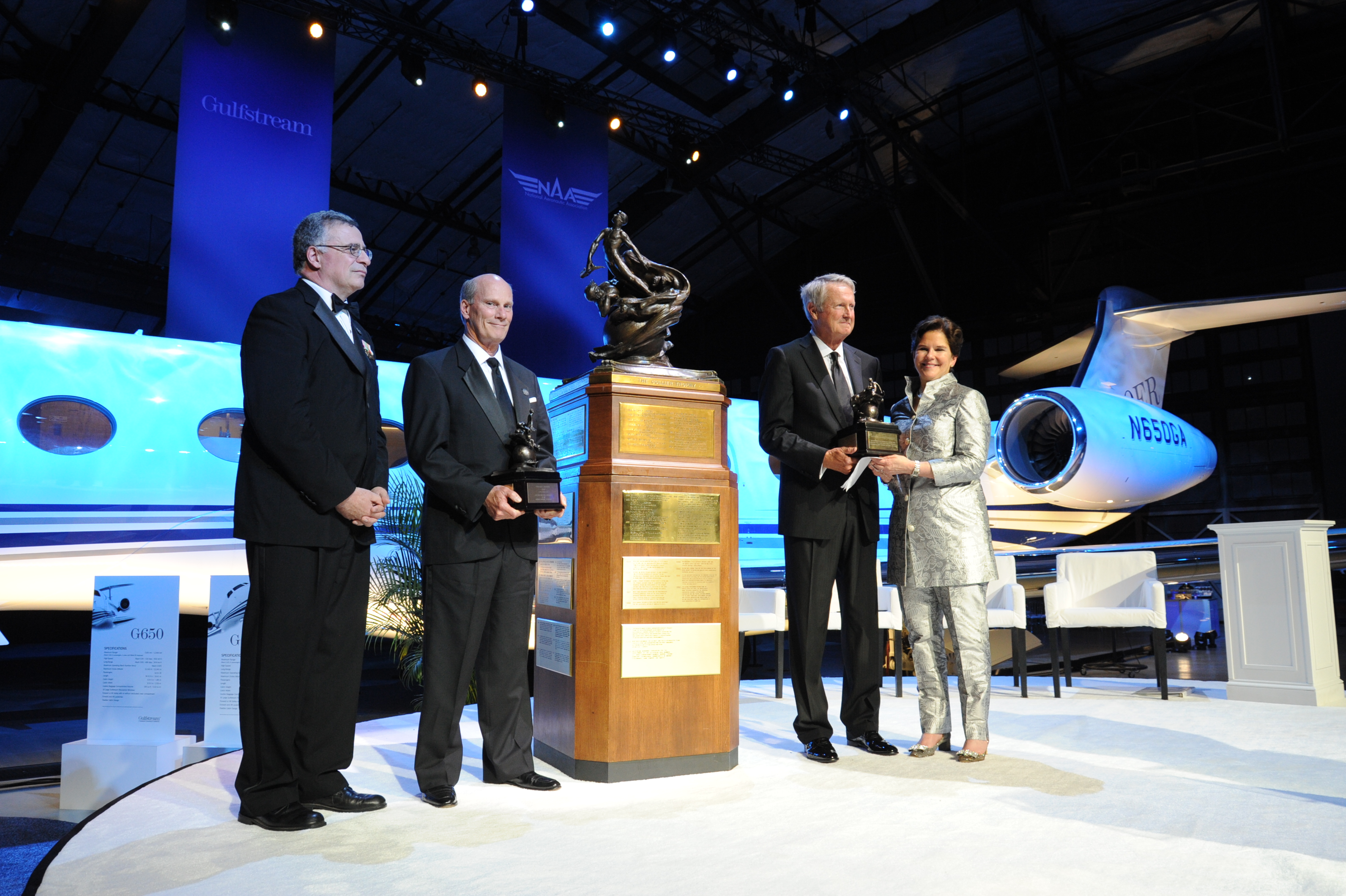
2014 Collier Trophy presentation

This list of space technology awards is an index to articles about notable awards related to space technology. This includes awards for development of spacecraft, satellites, space stations, and support infrastructure, equipment, and procedures. The list shows the country of the sponsoring organization, but awards are not necessarily limited to people or organizations based in that country.

== Awards ==
| Country | Award | Sponsor | Given for |
|---|---|---|---|
| France | Allan D. Emil Memorial Award | International Astronautical Federation | Outstanding contribution in space science, space technology, space medicine, or space law which involved the participation of more than one nation and/or which furthered the possibility of greater international cooperation in astronautics |
| United States | America's Space Prize | Bigelow Aerospace | First US-based privately funded team to design and build a reusable crewed capsule capable of flying five astronauts to a Bigelow Aerospace inflatable space module. Expired in 2010 |
| United States | Ansari X Prize | Amir Ansari / X Prize Foundation | For first non-government organization to launch a reusable crewed spacecraft into space twice within two weeks. Won in 2004. |
| India | Aryabhata Award | Astronautical Society of India | Notable lifetime contributions in the field of astronautics and aerospace technology in India |
| United States | Carl Sagan Memorial Award | American Astronautical Society, The Planetary Society | Demonstrated leadership in research or policies advancing exploration of the Cosmos |
| United States | Centennial Challenges | NASA | For various non-government-funded technological achievements by American teams |
| United States | Collier Trophy | National Aeronautic Association | Greatest achievement in aeronautics or astronautics in America, with respect to improving the performance, efficiency, and safety of air or space vehicles |
| United States | Dr. Robert H. Goddard Memorial Trophy | National Space Club | It is awarded annually to an individual or group determined to have made the most impact on space activities over the past year. It is named after Robert H. Goddard, the father of modern rocketry. |
| United States | Dirk Brouwer Award | American Astronautical Society | Significant technical contributions to space flight mechanics and astrodynamics |
| International | Edison Award | Edison Awards | Honoring excellence in innovation |
| United States | Eugene M. Emme Astronautical Literature Award | American Astronautical Society | Truly outstanding book serving public understanding about the positive impact of astronautics upon society |
| France | Frank J. Malina Astronautics Medal | International Astronautical Federation | Educator who has demonstrated excellence in taking the fullest advantage of the resources available to them to promote the study of astronautics and related space sciences |
| United States | Google Lunar X Prize | Google | For successfully launching, landing, and operating a rover on the lunar surface |
| United States | Harold Brown Award | United States Air Force | Scientist or engineer who applies scientific research to solve a problem critical to the needs of the Air Force |
| United States | Heinlein Prize for Advances in Space Commercialization | Heinlein Prize Trust | Individuals who make practical contributions to the commercialization of space |
| United States | IEEE Judith A. Resnik Award | Institute of Electrical and Electronics Engineers | Outstanding contributions to space engineering within the fields of interest of the IEEE |
| United States | Lew Allen Award | Jet Propulsion Laboratory | Significant accomplishments or leadership early in an individual's professional career at the Jet Propulsion Laboratory |
| United States | International Space Hall of Fame | New Mexico Museum of Space History | |
| France | Luigi G. Napolitano Award | International Astronautical Congress | Young scientist, below 30 years of age, who has contributed significantly to the advancement of the aerospace science |
| United States | Lunar Lander Challenge | NASA : Centennial Challenges | Series of prizes for teams that launch a vertical takeoff/vertical landing (VTVL) rocket that achieved the total delta-v needed for a vehicle to move between the surface of the Moon and its orbit. |
| United Kingdom | N-Prize | Paul H. Dear | To launch a satellite weighing between 9.99 and 19.99 grammes into Earth orbit, and to track it for a minimum of nine orbits. The launch budget must be under £999.99 including the launch vehicle, all of the required non-reusable launch equipment hardware, and propellant |
| United States | Nelson P. Jackson Aerospace Memorial Award | National Space Club | Established in 1960 to honor Nelson P. Jackson, it recognizes outstanding contributions to advancements in the missile, aircraft, and space fields. Described by NASA as “the space world's equivalent of an Academy Award" it is presented annually by the National Space Club during the Dr. Robert H. Goddard Memorial Dinner in Washington, D.C. |
| United States | Orbit Award | National Space Society and Space Tourism Society | Pioneers in the private space travel industry |
| United Kingdom | Sir Arthur Clarke Award | Arthur C. Clarke Foundation | Notable contributions to space exploration, particularly British achievements |
| United States | Space Flight Award | American Astronautical Society | Person whose outstanding efforts and achievements have contributed most significantly to the advancement of space flight and space exploration |
| United States | Space Pioneer Awards | National Space Society | Individuals and teams who have opened the space frontier |
| United States | Victor A. Prather Award | American Astronautical Society | Researchers, engineers and flight crew members in the field of extravehicular protection or activity in space |
| United States | Wright Brothers Medal | SAE International | Notable contributions in the engineering, design, development, or operation of air and space vehicles |
| Australia | Australian Space Awards | Space Connect | Open to all businesses supporting the Australian space industry across fields including launch, telecommunications, satellites, energy, mining and transport, as well as defence, agriculture, disaster and water management. |

== See also ==
- Lists of awards
- Lists of science and technology awards
- List of aviation awards
- List of astronomy awards
- List of challenge awards
