= Bristol Spaceplanes =

Bristol Spaceplanes Ltd.
- Company type: Private
- Industry: Aerospace
- Founded: 1991
- Key people: David Ashford (Managing Director)
- Products: Space tourism, Spaceplanes
- Website: http://www.bristolspaceplanes.com/

Bristol Spaceplanes (BSP) is a British aerospace company based in Bristol, England, who has designed a number of spaceplanes with sub-orbital and orbital capabilities. The company's stated goal is "to realise low-cost access to space", primarily through reusable launch vehicles, claiming the cost of human space travel has the potential to be reduced by a factor of 1,000.

== History ==
The company was founded in 1991 by David Ashford and has received three feasibility grants in 1993, 2003 and 2011 for the Ascender and Spacecab projects. A scaled down radio-controlled version of the Ascender spaceplane was successfully flown in 1998.

In the early 2000s, Bristol Spaceplanes Limited was an unsuccessful entrant in the Ansari X-Prize competition to be the first private crewed spaceflight vehicle to launch and relaunch in a week, losing out to Mojave Aerospace Ventures' Tier One combo of SpaceShipOne and WhiteKnightOne.

In September 2014 the firm launched a crowdfunding campaign to aid in the development of Ascender, aiming to raise £150,000.

In late 2014, the company was conducting bench testing of rocket engine designs for Ascender and is seeking funding to build a working model via crowdfunding.

Throughout the lifetime of the company David Ashford has released a number of published books and papers based around the aerospace industry and the exploration of space.

== Conceptual vehicles and spacecraft ==
=== Ascender ===
Ascender is a proposed small two-seater suborbital horizontal-takeoff, horizontal-landing (HTHL), jet- and rocket-powered spaceplane concept which is designed to be able to achieve altitudes of up to 100 kilometres (62 mi) via a steep sub-orbital trajectory.

This would allow it to be used for space tourism activity as well as microgravity research during the two minutes of weightlessness. The vehicle would take off from a typical runway using its two turbofan jet engines and climb to cruising altitudes. It would then switch to its hydrogen peroxide rocket engine and climb past 80 kilometres (50 mi) and then would reenter the atmosphere and glide back to the runway it took off from, using its jet engines to maneuver.

The majority of attention and energy of the company has been focused on the Ascender launcher due to its short-term feasibility compared to the other projects. It has been designed to not require any new materials or unproven components.

=== Spacecab ===
The Spacecab spaceplane design concept consists of a large crewed "carrier" aircraft with a smaller "orbiter" attached on top, both of which are derived from Ascender. The carrier would take off from an airstrip and use its turbofan engines to accelerate to mach 2 at which point it would switch over to its LOX/Kerosene rocket engines to accelerate to mach 4. The orbiter craft would then detach and accelerate to orbital speeds and altitudes using its LOX/LH2 rocket. It would be capable of delivering up to 750 kg to low Earth orbit, and also transporting supplies and crew to the International Space Station, an increasingly important capability following the retirement of the Space Shuttle. Spacecab can be thought of as the intermediate next step in development between Ascender and Spacebus, and like Ascender it does not require any new technology or materials and has been the subject of a 1994 feasibility study confirming this claim.

=== Spacebus ===
The Spacebus spaceplane concept is the largest, most ambitious, costly, and difficult project proposed by the company. It has a similar, but scaled-up design to Spacecab with a "carrier" craft accelerating up to mach 4 with Ramjet engines and then up to mach 6 with rocket engines. The smaller "orbiter" would then detach and accelerate into orbit with LOX/LH2 rocket engines with a payload of up to 5000 kg or 50 passengers. Despite requiring a new Ramjet design and significant developments with the heatshield, rocket engines, hydrogen fuel system, and transparencies, Spacebus is still claimed to be more feasible than other ongoing spaceplane projects.

== See also ==
- Lynx spaceplane, a cancelled two-person spaceplane similar to Ascender.
