= Micro-Space =

Aerospace corporation

- Formerly: Spectron Instrument Corporation
- Industry: Aerospace
- Founded: February 1977 in Denver, Colorado, USA
- Founder: Richard P. Speck
- Defunct: 2011
- Fate: Dissolved
- Headquarters: Denver, Colorado, United States

Micro-Space was an aerospace corporation based in Denver, Colorado, founded in February 1977 by Richard P. Speck under the name Spectron Instrument Corporation. The corporation changed its name to "Micro-Space, Inc." in 1998. It was dissolved in 2011, following the death of the founder.

In addition to funding and building a number of its own spacecraft and rockets, Micro-Space was a component supplier to the emerging CubeSat industry.

== Philosophy ==
Micro-Space operated using a strategy based on using modern technology to achieve radical downsizing of space systems to minimize launch cost and make mission financing feasible. They claimed that cost-effectiveness is maximised by creating satellites the size of lunchboxes or cell phones, as opposed to "Volkswagens".

== History ==
While one of the smaller teams participating in the Ansari X Prize competition, Micro-Space had previously developed an active aerospace program flying innovative liquid fueled rockets. A long history of flying small rockets with telemetry, tracking and control systems demonstrates its focus on the fundamental systems necessary for uncrewed - and eventually crewed - suborbital and orbital launch vehicle and satellite systems. While its operational systems are most appropriate for atmospheric research, the company claims to have produced modules which, if clustered, could power a "spartan" crewed launch.

Seventeen liquid fueled, bipropellant rockets were successfully flown by 2006, with altitudes to 11,000 feet. Hydrogen peroxide and methyl alcohol were the fuels.

Micro-Space competed in the 2006 Lunar Lander Challenge held in Las Cruces, New Mexico, part of the Centennial Challenges competitions sponsored by NASA, and was considered by event organizers as one of two favorites to win.

Micro-Space also built operational prototypes suitable for long duration life support and other needs of lunar and interplanetary missions, including Mars landing. The company was dissolved in 2011.

Micro-Space was manifested to fly two CubeSats on a "Ride Sharing" launch with EduSAT, Sich-2 and other spacecraft, to be flown on a Dnepr rocket into a near-polar Sun-synchronous orbit in October 2010. Payload integration for this satellite group was handled by Morehead State University, involving Dr. Ben Malphrus (Space Science Center director) and professor Bob Twiggs. Micro-Space also planned to deliver two similar spacecraft to Morehead State and the University of Colorado at Colorado Springs.

The complete, four satellite "PQ-Gemini ++" mission group, in addition to validating general satellite systems, was to be capable of demonstrating Micro-Space interferometric techniques to characterize orbital differences using only precision range data between ultralight spacecraft in preparation for autonomous rendezvous. Additional systems were to allow the relative positions, distance and rotational alignment of the four satellites to be continuously monitored. This information is necessary for the final, docking procedures. Other developmental steps were projected to follow, leading to ultralight sample return missions on the Moon and Mars.

In 2010 Micro-space was selected to negotiate a NASA Phase I SBIR contract entitled "Non-Radiated Field Link to Recharge, Reprogram, Test and Co-ordinate Aux. Payload Systems". Unfortunately, the untimely death of Richard P. Speck in October 2010 effectively halted all programs.

In 2007, Micro-Space was discussing return sample analysis and lunar prospecting with several organizations. Prospecting operations will be aimed at locating concentrations of extractable lunar gems and minerals. High grade titanium, rare-earth metals and helium-3 (a potential fusion reactor fuel) are all known to exist on the Moon. Low cost flight of concentrated ores to the Earth is feasible using Solar Powered, electromagnetic "Rail guns", and other technologies.

Propellant to complete rendezvous and docking was not allowed in the planned satellite cluster launch. Arrangements were being negotiated for launch 2011 of small Micro-Space spacecraft with propulsion systems to demonstrate the complete rendezvous and docking process as will be used with “Planetary Ascent Vehicles” carrying prospecting samples. Negotiations with this launch supplier also cover subsequent launch of a “Lunar Lander” and Lunar Transfer spacecraft, as well as the Planetary Ascent and Return vehicles.
