= Ansari X Prize =

Space competition and award

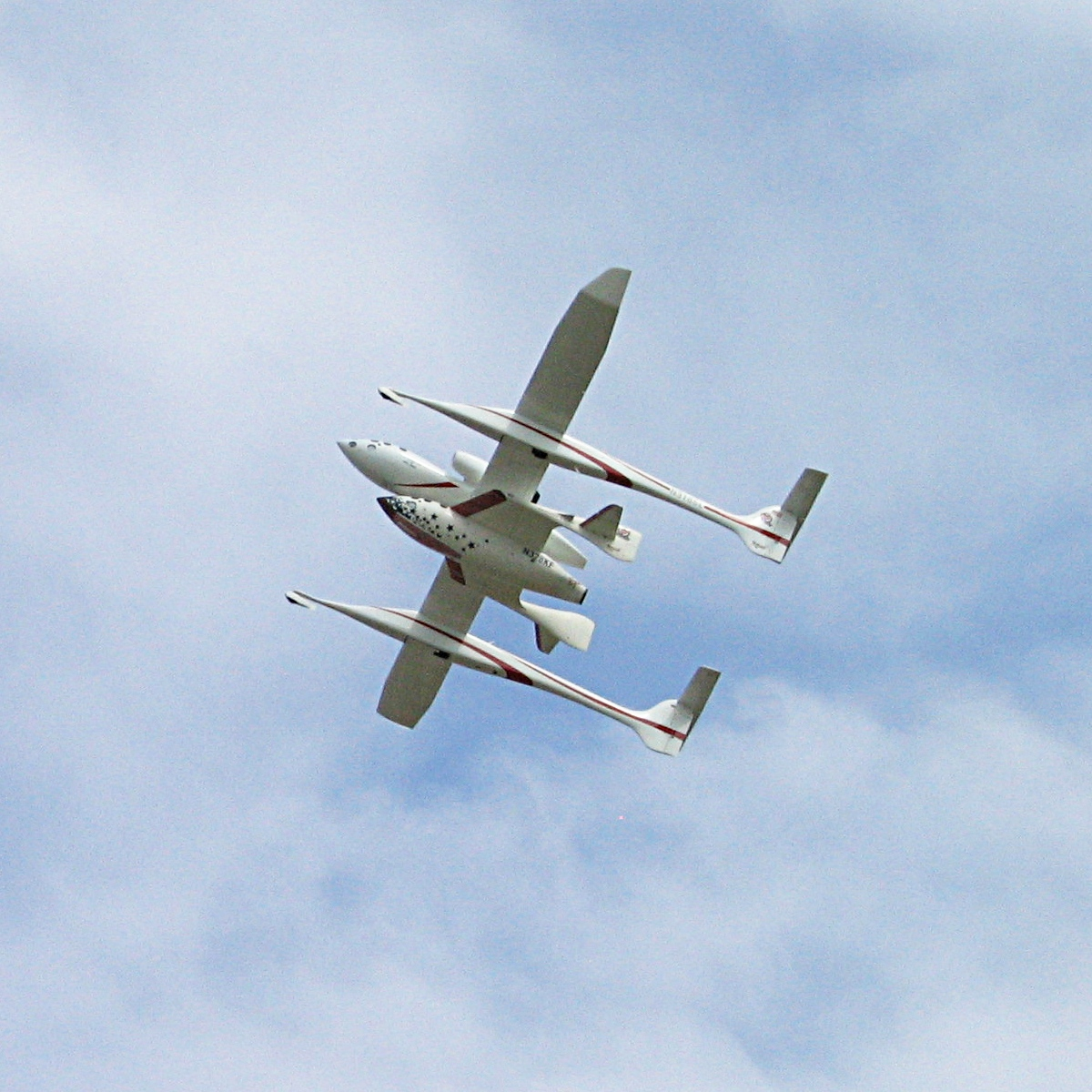
- The winning spaceplane SpaceShipOne being carried below its launch vehicle White Knight
- Awarded for: "build and launch a spacecraft capable of carrying three people to 100 kilometers above the Earth's surface, twice within two weeks"
- Country: Worldwide
- Presented by: X PRIZE Foundation
- Reward: US$10 million
- Final award: October 4, 2004
- Winner: Scaled Composites
- Website: ansari.xprize.org

The Ansari X Prize was a space competition in which the X Prize Foundation offered a US$10,000,000 (equivalent to $21,000,000 in 2025) prize for the first non-government organization to launch a reusable crewed spacecraft into space twice within two weeks. It was modeled after early 20th-century aviation prizes, and aimed to spur development of low-cost spaceflight.

Created in May 1996 and initially called just the "X Prize", it was renamed the "Ansari X Prize" on May 6, 2004, following a multimillion-dollar donation from entrepreneurs Anousheh Ansari and Amir Ansari.

The prize was won on October 4, 2004, the 47th anniversary of the Sputnik 1 launch, by the Tier One project designed by Burt Rutan and financed by Microsoft co-founder Paul Allen, using the experimental spaceplane SpaceShipOne. $10 million was awarded to the winner, and more than $100 million was invested in new technologies in pursuit of the prize.

Several other X Prizes have since been announced by the X Prize Foundation, promoting further development in space exploration and other technological fields.

== Motivation ==
The X Prize was inspired by the Orteig Prize—the 1919 prize worth 25,000 dollars offered by New York hotel owner Raymond Orteig that encouraged a number of intrepid aviators in the mid-1920s to fly across the Atlantic Ocean from New York to Paris—which was ultimately won in 1927 by Charles Lindbergh in his aircraft Spirit of St. Louis. In reading the 1953 book, The Spirit of St. Louis during 1994, Peter Diamandis realized that "such a prize, updated and offered ... as a space prize, might be just what was needed to bring space travel to the general public, to jump-start a commercial space industry."

Diamandis developed a fully formed idea for a "suborbital space barnstorming prize", and set an initial goal of finding backers to support a US$10 million prize. He named it the X Prize, in part because "X" could serve as a variable for the name of the person who might later back the prize; any craft built to win the prize would be experimental, and a long line of experimental aircraft built for the US Air Force had been so designated, including the X-15 that was, in 1963, the first government-built craft to carry a human into space; and because "Ten is the Roman numeral X".

The X Prize was publicly proposed by Diamandis in an address to the NSS International Space Development Conference in 1995. The competition goal was adopted from the SpaceCub project, demonstration of a private vehicle capable of flying a pilot to the edge of space, defined as 100 km altitude. This goal was selected to help encourage the space industry in the private sector, which is why the entries were not allowed to have any government funding. It aimed to demonstrate that spaceflight can be affordable and accessible to corporations and civilians, opening the door to commercial spaceflight and space tourism. It is also hoped that competition will breed innovation, introducing new low-cost methods of reaching Earth orbit, and ultimately pioneering low-cost space travel and unfettered human expansion into the Solar System.

NASA is developing a similar prize program called Centennial Challenges to generate innovative solutions to space technology problems.

== Contestants ==
Twenty-six teams from around the world participated, ranging from volunteer hobbyists to large corporate-backed operations:

- Acceleration Engineering
- Advent Launch Services – website
- ARCA – website
- Armadillo Aerospace – website
- American Astronautics Corporation (AERA) – website
- Bristol Spaceplanes Limited – website
- Canadian Arrow
- The da Vinci Project
- Pablo de Leon & Associates – website
- Discraft Corporation
- Flight Exploration
- Fundamental Technology Systems
- High Altitude Research Corporation – website
- IL Aerospace Technologies – website
- Interorbital Systems – website
- Kelly Space and Technology – website
- Lone Star Space Access Corporation – website
- Micro-Space, Inc. – website
- Len Cormier's PanAero, Inc. – website
- Pioneer Rocketplane – website
- Scaled Composites' Tier One project – Winning Team
- Space Transport Corporation
- Starchaser Industries – website
- Suborbital Corporation
- TGV Rockets – website
- Vanguard Spacecraft
- Whalen Aeronautics Inc.

Some sources mention two other companies:

- AeroAstro*
- Cerulean Freight Forwarding Co.,

but do not mention Whalen Aeronautics Inc.

== Winning team ==
The Tier One project made two successful competitive flights: X1 on September 29, 2004, piloted by Mike Melvill to 102.9 km; and X2 on October 4, 2004, piloted by Brian Binnie to 112 km. They thus won the prize, which was awarded on November 6, 2004. In press coverage, the winning team has been variously referred to as Mojave Aerospace Ventures, the corporation that funded the attempt; Tier One, the project name of Mojave's contest entry; and Scaled Composites, the manufacturer of the craft.

At least two documentaries were created to document the efforts of the winning team to win the prize. They included Black Sky: The Race for Space and Black Sky: Winning the X Prize. The documentaries chronicle the story of Burt Rutan and SpaceShipOne.

As of 2011, the trophy is on display in the Saint Louis Science Center in St. Louis, Missouri.

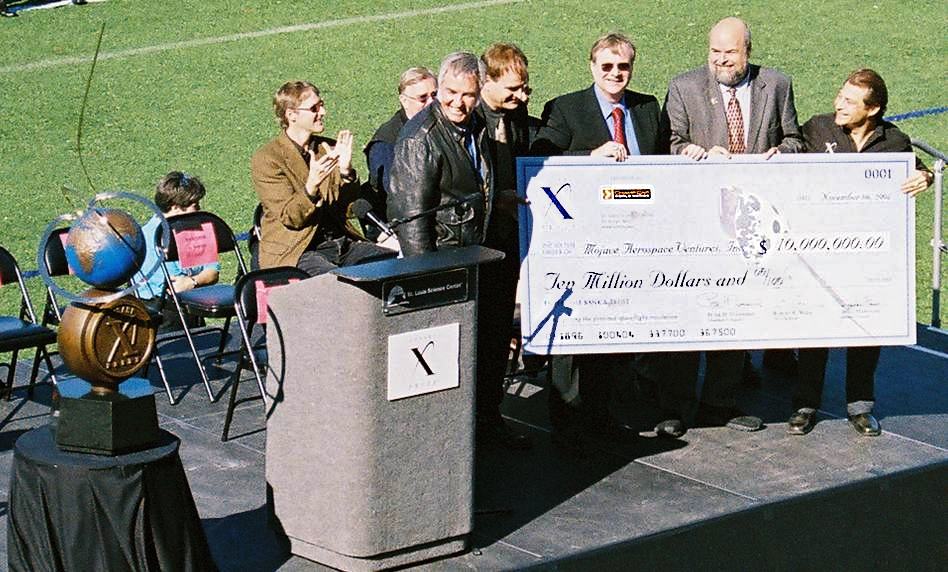
Representatives of the X Prize Foundation symbolically presented the ten million dollar prize to Burt Rutan and Paul Allen of Mojave Aerospace Ventures on November 6, 2004. The Ansari X Prize trophy is on the left.

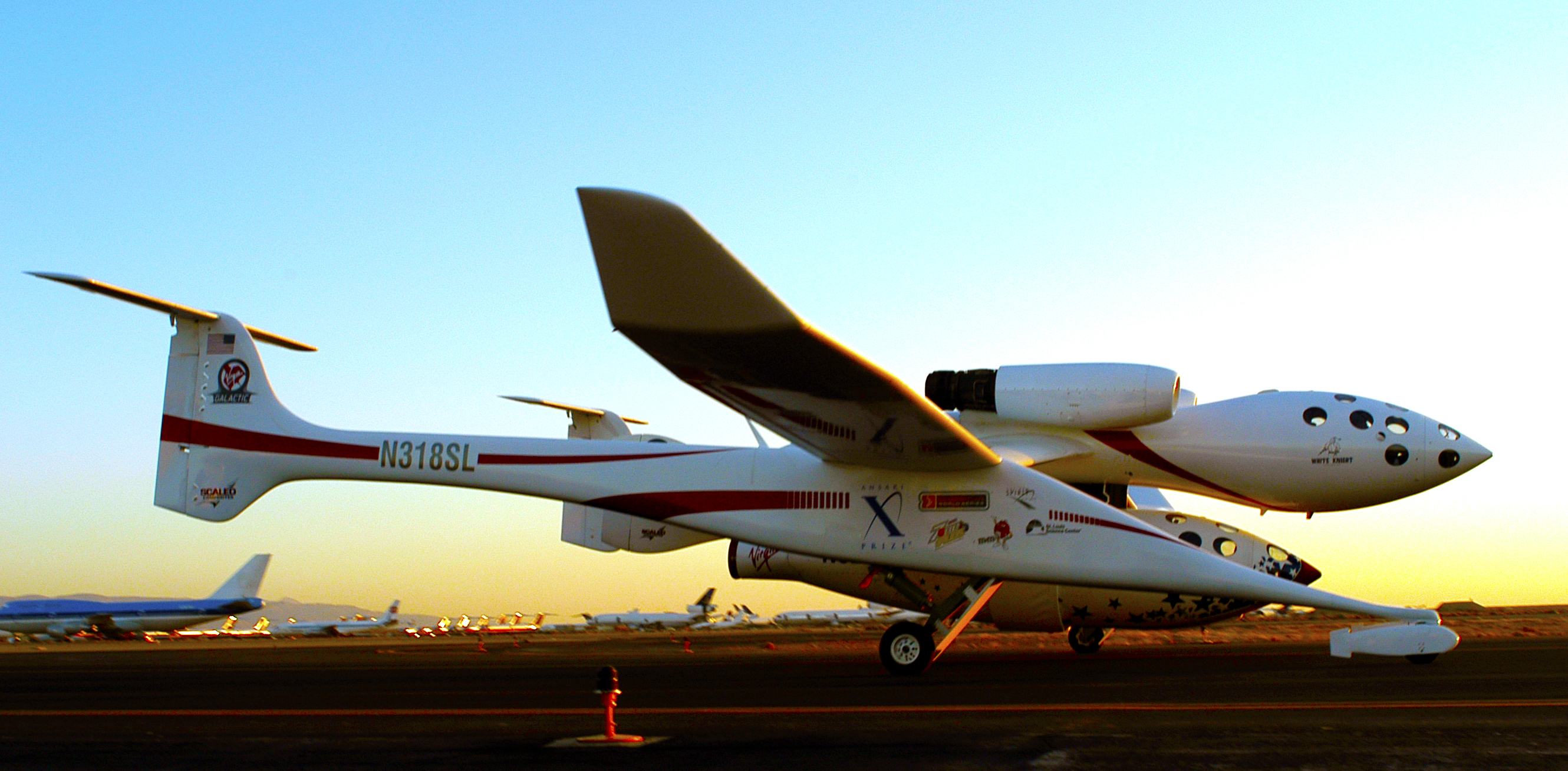
SpaceShipOne Flight 16P taxi pre launch

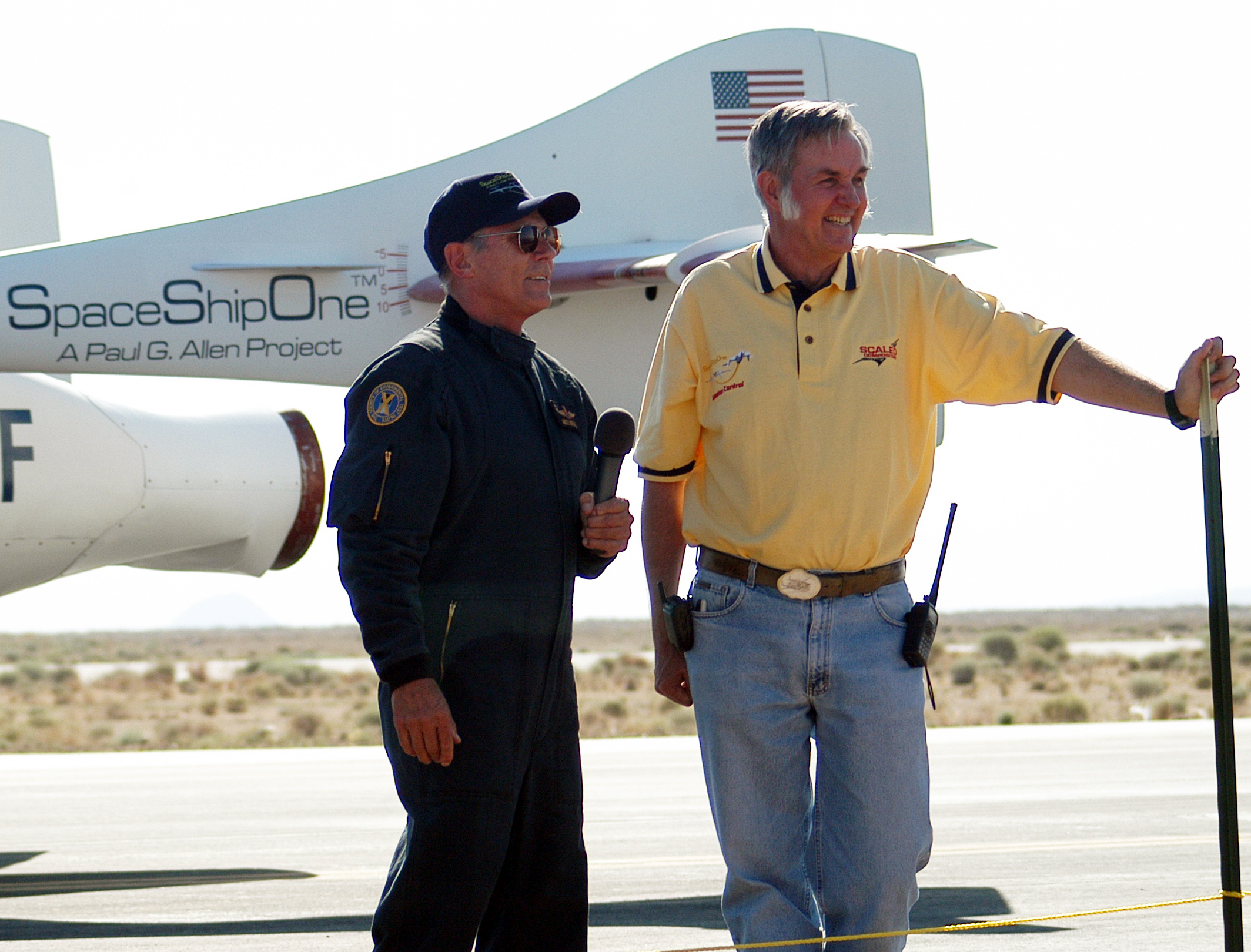
Mike Melvill and Burt Rutan speak to the media after the first flight into space.

== Unsuccessful attempts ==
Although only the Tier One team actually launched a spacecraft on a sub-orbital spaceflight, several other teams have conducted low-altitude tests or announced future plans to launch into space:

- ARCA launched Demonstrator 2B rocket on September 9, 2004, at Cape Midia Air Force Base in Romania. It was the first flight of a reusable monopropellant rocket.
- The da Vinci Project originally announced that their first flight would be on October 2, 2004, but this was postponed indefinitely on September 23, 2004, as they were unable to obtain a few necessary components in time. No flight ever occurred.
- The Canadian Arrow team conducted a successful full-power engine test in 2005 and announced on June 2, 2005, that it had received permission from the Canadian government to use Cape Rich as a future launch site.
- On August 8, 2004, Space Transport Corporation's Rubicon 1 and Armadillo Aerospace's unnamed test vehicle, in two separate uncrewed test launches, both crashed and were destroyed.
- On February 15, 2005, AERA Corporation (formerly American Astronautics) announced its plans to send seven paying passengers into space as early as 2006, a full year before the first announced speculative Virgin Galactic flight.

== List of major donors by amount ==
- Anousheh Ansari and Amir Ansari, the official sponsors of the competition.
- First USA (J.P. Morgan Chase), US$1,000,000
- New Spirit of St. Louis Organization
- Danforth Foundation, US$500,000
- Tom Clancy, $100K–US$500,000
- J.S. McDonnell (McDonnell Douglas)
- Andrew Taylor (Enterprise Rent-A-Car)
- Andrew Beal (Beal Bank)
- St. Louis Science Center

== Organization ==
With the Ansari X Prize, the X Prize Foundation (based in Santa Monica, CA) established a philanthropic model in which offering a prize for achieving a specific goal stimulates entrepreneurial investment that produces a tenfold or greater return on the prize purse and at least one hundredfold in follow-on investment and social benefit. The Foundation has developed into a non-profit prize institute that conceives, designs and manages public competitions for the benefit of humanity.

== Funding ==
The funding for the US $10,000,000 prize was unconventional. It came from a "hole-in-one insurance policy". It was "fully funded through January 1, 2005, through private donations and backed by an insurance policy to guarantee that the $10 million is in place on the day that the prize is won."

== Spin-offs ==
The success of the X Prize competition has spurred spin-offs that are set up in the same way. There have been two major spin-offs at this point, the first of which is the M Prize (short for Methuselah Mouse Prize), which is a prize set up by University of Cambridge biogerontologist Aubrey de Grey which will go to the scientific team that successfully extends the life or reverses the aging of mice, which would then eventually be available to humans. The second is the NASA Centennial Challenges, which consist of (among others) the Tether Challenge in which teams compete to develop superstrong tethers as a component to space elevators, and the Beam Power Challenge which encourages ideas for transmitting power wirelessly. An independent spin-off called the N-Prize was started by Cambridge Microbiologist Paul H. Dear in 2007, designed to foster research into low-cost orbital launchers.

The X Prize foundation itself is developing additional prizes: the Archon X Prize, to advance research in the field of genomics; the Automotive X Prize, an engineering competition to create a fuel efficient clean car; the Wirefly X Prize Cup, an annually held air & space exposition featuring space-related competitions and rocketry, and the Google Lunar X Prize, a competition for privately funded lunar exploration. Of several awards on offer, the largest—$20 million—will be awarded to the first privately funded team to produce a robot that lands on the Moon and travels 500 m (1,640 ft) across its surface.

There is also a possible "H-Prize", focused on hydrogen vehicle research, although this goal has been addressed by H.R. 5143, an X-Prize-inspired bill passed by the United States House of Representatives, which was later folded into the Energy Independence and Security Act of 2007.

== See also ==
Ansari X Prize:

- Tier One: SpaceShipOne + WhiteKnightOne
- Black Sky: The Race For Space (2004 telefim) Discovery Channel documentary about the Ansari X Prize
- How to Make a Spaceship (2016 book) by Julian Buthrie, about the Ansari X Prize

Similar topics:

- NASA Centennial Challenges
- Orteig Prize
- America's Space Prize
- Methuselah Mouse Prize, or M Prize (modeled after the Ansari X Prize)
- N-Prize, a low-budget orbital satellite insertion challenge
- List of space technology awards
- List of challenge awards
- List of awards named after people

Related technical topics:

- Specific impulse
- Tsiolkovsky rocket equation
- Delta-v
