= Orbit Award =

The Orbit Awards were given by the National Space Society and the Space Tourism Society to pioneers in the private space travel industry, and presented at the Annual International Space Development Conference

The actual award is a holographic crystal created by international artist, Eileen Borgeson and holography pioneer, Jeff Allen. ‘Orbit Awards’ were co-sponsored by EArt Gallery and Interior Systems, and were received by: Buzz Aldrin, Richard Branson, Paul Allen, Rick Searfoss, Robert Bigelow, The X PRIZE Foundation, Scaled Composites, Zero Gravity Corporation, Eric Anderson and Anousheh Ansari.

== See also ==
- List of space technology awards
