= Space competition =

Inducement prize contest in the field of space exploration

A space competition is an inducement prize contest offering a prize to be given to the first competitor who demonstrates a space vehicle, or a space exploration apparatus, which meets a set of pre-established criteria. It spurs pioneering development in private spaceflight.

== X PRIZE ==
The Ansari X PRIZE was a space competition in which the X PRIZE Foundation offered a US$10,000,000 prize for the first non-government organization to launch a reusable human spacecraft into space twice within two weeks. It was modeled after early 20th-century aviation prizes, and aimed to spur development of low-cost spaceflight. The prize was won on October 4, 2004, the 47th anniversary of the Sputnik 1 launch, by the Tier One project designed by Burt Rutan and financed by Microsoft co-founder Paul Allen, using the experimental spaceplane SpaceShipOne. $10 million was awarded to the winner, but more than $100 million was invested in new technologies in pursuit of the prize.

== Google Lunar X Prize ==
Google Lunar X Prize calls for teams to compete in successfully launching, landing, and operating a rover on the lunar surface. The prize awards US$20 million to the first team to land a rover on the Moon that successfully roves more than 500 meters and transmits back high-definition images and video. There is a $5 million second prize, as well as $5 million in potential bonus prizes for extra features such as roving long distances (greater than 5,000 meters), capturing images of manmade objects on the Moon, detecting ice on one of the Moon's craters, or surviving a lunar night. The X Prize offers the first prize until December 31, 2012, thereafter it offers $15 million until December 31, 2014.

== America's Space Prize ==
America's Space Prize is a US$50 million orbital spaceflight competition established and funded by hotel entrepreneur Robert Bigelow. The prize would have been awarded to the first US-based privately funded team to design and build a reusable crewed capsule capable of flying 5 astronauts to a Bigelow Aerospace inflatable space module. The prize expired January 10, 2010. There must be two flights within 60 days. The teams must be based in the United States.

== Other, sub-million dollar prizes ==
In addition, there are several minor space competitions, with prizes being less than one million dollars or its equivalent.

=== Centennial Challenges ===
Seeking to continue this incentive-based approach, in 2006 the X PRIZE Foundation organized the Wirefly X PRIZE Cup at Las Cruces International Airport in New Mexico. Cash awards were offered in three areas as part of the NASA Centennial Challenges Program: the Beam Power Challenge, the Tether Challenge, and the Northrop Grumman Lunar Lander Challenge.

Although no contestants fulfilled the criteria necessary to win any of the three challenges, the competition elicited promising technology developments and demonstrated their potential to the general public. Subsequent annual X PRIZE Cups are planned to encourage further innovation in the personal spaceflight industry, and are expected to feature cash prizes for vehicle developers who achieve milestones such as fastest launch turnaround time, maximum altitude, and fastest speed record.

=== Mars Prize Fund ===
The Mars Prize Fund was created to encourage a human Mars mission to occur sooner than was planned. Managed by The Mars Initiative, The Mars Prize Fund is crowdfunded by people across Earth and will be awarded to the lead organization that first lands one or more humans safely on Mars. https://marsinitiative.org/

As of September 2026, the Mars Prize Fund has raised $70,000 and is growing every month. Estimates put the cost of a Mars mission at roughly $100/mile, so every donor who hits this mark is given a Certificate of Recognition for sponsoring one ‘Mars Mile’ of humanity's journey to the Red Planet.

=== N-Prize ===
The challenge posed by the N-Prize is to launch a satellite weighing between 9.99 and 19.99 grams into Earth orbit, and to track it for a minimum of nine orbits. Most importantly, though, the launch budget must be within £999.99 (about $2000) - and must include all of the required non-reusable hardware and fuels. According to the full rules of the N-Prize, it is "intended to encourage creativity, originality and inventiveness in the face of severe odds and impossible financial restrictions" and "is aimed at amateurs, enthusiasts, would-be boffins and foolhardy optimists."

=== NewSpace Business Plan Competition ===
This competition for new business plans with space applications was founded in 2012. It was won by Space Ground Amalgam, LLC in 2012, and Generation Orbit in 2013.
