= SpaceCub =

SpaceCub was a design project for a homebuilt rocket. Between 1993 and 1994, Geoffrey A. Landis proposed that a vehicle designed to launch to the edge of space might be a feasible project for a "personal" spaceship, the equivalent of a Piper Cub for space. The insight was that a flight to "only" 100 km would reach the officially defined edge of space, and even though this is much easier a challenge than an orbital flight, such a suborbital flight would be of excitement to the public, and the pilot would be officially qualified as an astronaut. A small group of rocket enthusiasts, computer hobbyists, and science-fiction writers gathered together to do a preliminary design, with the ultimate goal of moving on to building a prototype, with (then) physics student David Burkhead leading the technical effort. The vehicle design was discussed in many venues, and presentations on the design progress were given in several conferences, such as the 1995 NSS International Space Development Conference, where it attracted considerable popular attention. The design was featured in print in places including the December 1994 Popular Mechanics, and the Brazilian popular magazine Istoé.

Although a full-scale prototype of the SpaceCub was never built, the design (and the publicity surrounding the project) brought public attention to the concept that a small vehicle to fly a private pilot into space might be possible, and in that way served to stimulate the X Prize, which adopted the SpaceCub's goal of a 100-km flight altitude as a target for a competition. In its way, the SpaceCub vehicle is a predecessor to many of today's concepts for space tourism.
