= Black Sky: The Race for Space =

2005 film

- Starring: Burt Rutan, Paul Allen, James Benson
- Production company: Vulcan Productions
- Distributed by: Discovery Channel
- Release date: October 3, 2004
- Running time: 143
- Country: United States
- Language: English

Black Sky: The Race For Space is a 2004 Discovery Channel documentary about Space Ship One, and how a small team backed by Paul Allen achieved human suborbital spaceflight and won the Ansari X Prize. It contains insights about how the rocketplane was built, the challenges they faced when they flew it, the vision of Burt Rutan about the future of this technology (tier two and three), and his thoughts about NASA and government. It won a Peabody Award in 2004.

== See also ==
- Orphans of Apollo, 2008 documentary on the tentative plan to privatize the space station Mir
- How to Make a Spaceship, 2016 book by Julian Guthrie about the Ansari X Prize
