= JP Aerospace =

American NewSpace company

- Industry: Aerospace
- Founder: John Marchel Powell; Michael Stucky; Scott Mayo
- Website: jpaerospace.com

JP Aerospace is an American company building air and space vehicles with the purpose of creating affordable access to space. Their main activities include high-atmospheric lighter-than-air flights carrying cameras or miniature experiments called PongSats and minicubes. They are also engaged in an Airship to Orbit project.

JP Aerospace was founded by John Marchel Powell, familiarly known as "JP", with Michael Stucky and Scott Mayo. JP Aerospace specializes in lighter-than-air flight, with the stated aim of achieving cheap access to space.

== Balloon flights ==
An early suborbital space launch attempt using a rockoon (balloon-launched high power rocket) at the Black Rock Desert in northwestern Nevada in May 1999 was unsuccessful. The event was covered by CNN. The CATS Prize expired without being awarded in November 2000.

In the early 21st century they developed a V-shaped high-altitude airship under a U.S. Air Force initiative to provide the rapid launch of battlefield communication and monitoring systems.

Since then, JP Aerospace has launched several balloons into the upper atmosphere, carrying mixed payloads for research students and media companies. Media clients have included The Discovery Channel, National Geographic, and Toshiba's 2009 television commercial Space Chair. In 2011, a twin-balloon utility airship is claimed to have set an altitude record of 95,085 feet (ca. 28,982 m) on October 22, 2011.

A PongSat is a small experiment housed in a table tennis or ping-pong ball. A MiniCube is slightly larger. JP Aerospace claim to have carried many hundreds or thousands of student PongSat projects to a near-space environment at low cost. The flights are typically crowdfunded.

Commercial flights, typically carrying cameras, have been made for a number of media organizations.

== Airships ==
JP Aerospace obtained a contract for development of military communication and surveillance airships designed to hover over battlefields at altitudes too high for conventional anti-aircraft systems. A prototype was completed in 2005 but was damaged while being prepared for flight and the contract was ended.

Other vehicles are still under development, and JP aerospace has subsequently flown several aerostats as testbeds for ATO hardware and techniques.

The JP Aerospace Twin Balloons Airship is an unmanned airship comprising two balloon envelopes side by side, with twin electric-powered propellers mounted midway along the connecting boom. On October 22, 2011 it is claimed to have flown to 95,085 feet (ca. 28,982 m), nearly 4 miles higher than any airship before.

== Airship to Orbit project ==
JP Aerospace is developing technology intended to launch airships into orbit.

The proposed system employs three separate airship stages to reach orbit. Multiple vehicles are needed because an airship made strong enough to survive the dense and turbulent lower atmosphere would be too small and heavy to lift payloads high enough. An orbital airship must be much larger and with thinner walls to maintain its buoyancy-to-weight ratio. The three stages are; the Ascender ground launcher, the Dark Sky permanent sky station, and the Orbital Ascender spacecraft. A fourth airship design similar to the record-breaking Tandem but based on air-filled beams will be required for the assembly of Dark Sky Station.

Because of the thin atmosphere at such high altitudes, to carry a useful payload very large volume and/or very strong but lightweight materials are required. The ISAS BU60-1 scientific balloon holds the world altitude record for an unmanned balloon as of 2009, at 53.0 km. The average density of BU60-1 over its gross volume was 0.00066 kg per cubic meter. To fly higher, this must be significantly improved.

=== Ascender ===
The Ascender airship would operate between the ground and the Dark Sky Station at 140,000 feet (ca. 42,672 m). A long, V-shaped planform with an airfoil profile would provide aerodynamic lift to supplement the airship's inherent buoyancy, with the craft driven by propellers designed to operate in a near vacuum. The Ascender would be larger than any airship yet built, but would be dwarfed by the later stages. It would be operated by a crew of three.

JP aerospace has developed two large-scale test models, the Ascender 90 and the Ascender 175. The number denotes the length of the airship in feet (ca. 27.4 m and 53.3 m). More recent airships have reverted to being named in sequence.

=== Dark Sky Station ===
The Dark Sky Station would be a permanent floating structure, remaining at 140,000 feet (ca. 42,672 m). It provides an intermediate stage allowing transfer of cargo or personnel between the Ascender stage and the orbital stage. It would also serve as the construction facility for the orbital component, which would be too fragile to travel lower.

The station could also be used as a relay station for telecommunications due to its high altitude.

=== Orbital Ascender ===
The Orbital Ascender airship would be the final flight stage from the station to orbit. It would initially rise as a lighter-than-air craft from the station at 140,000 feet to 180,000 feet (ca. 42,672 m to 54,864 m). The orbiter would have to be over a mile long to gain enough buoyancy.

At 180,000 ft it would accelerate forwards using lightweight, low power ion propulsion, enabling it to rise further with additional aerodynamic lift. This would be powered by solar panels which cover most of the upper surface of the airship. The V-shaped planform and airfoil profile would allow hypersonic flight by 200,000 feet, increasing to orbital speed (above Mach 20).

If hit by a meteorite or space debris, this would have little effect because the inner cells are "zero pressure balloons" saying "There is no difference in pressure to create a bursting force. All a meteorite would do is to make a hole. The gas would leak out staggeringly slowly..." (Page 112). They also say (page 109) that ""By losing velocity before it reaches the lower thicker atmosphere, the reentry temperatures are radically lower.... This makes reentry as safe as the climb to orbit". The skin would be made of nylon rip-stop polyethylene (page 111). On re-entry the orbital airship slows down at a very high altitude because it has such low mass with such a large cross section presented to the atmosphere (a low ballistic coefficient).

== See also ==
- Near space
- NewSpace
- Orbital Launch Proposals
- Space Fellowship
