= Amir Ansari =

Iranian-American engineer (born 1970)

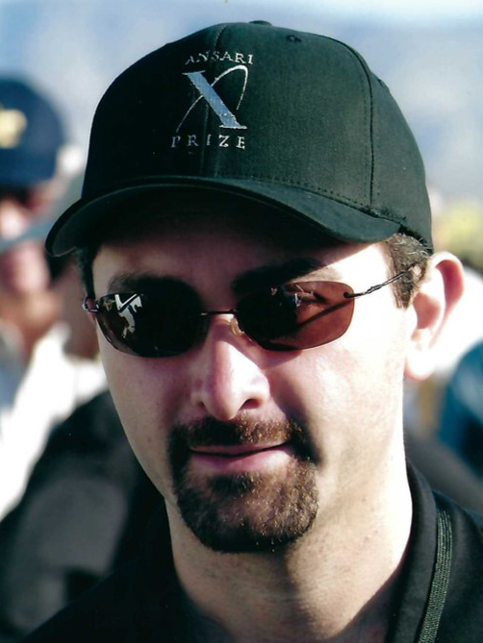
- Amir Ansari at the Ansari X Prize event, 2004
- Born: 1970 (age 55–56); Tehran, Iran
- Education: George Mason University
- Occupations: Engineer, entrepreneur, philanthropist
- Known for: Co-founding Telecom Technologies and Prodea Systems; sponsorship of the Ansari X Prize

Amir Ansari (born 1970) is an Iranian-American engineer, inventor, and entrepreneur. He is best known as a co-founder of the telecommunications company Telecom Technologies, Inc. and the digital services firm Prodea Systems. Ansari and his family were major sponsors of the Ansari X Prize, a $10 million competition for private spaceflight, and he serves on the board of directors of the Xprize Foundation. He has been involved in multiple technology ventures and philanthropic initiatives in telecommunications, education, and commercial spaceflight.

== Early life and education ==
Ansari was born in 1970 in Tehran, Iran, and immigrated to the United States as a child. He earned a Bachelor of Science degree in electrical engineering and computer science from George Mason University in Fairfax, Virginia.

== Career ==
=== Telecom Technologies, Inc. ===
In 1993, Amir Ansari co-founded Telecom Technologies, Inc. (TTI) alongside his brother Hamid Ansari and sister-in-law Anousheh Ansari. He served as the company's chief technology officer (CTO). TTI developed one of the industry's first softswitch platforms for voice over IP (VoIP), allowing telecom carriers to integrate traditional and next-generation IP networks. Under Ansari's technical leadership, the company’s VoIP technology helped reduce telephone costs and gained widespread industry adoption.

By 2000, the company employed nearly 220 people at its headquarters in Richardson, Texas. In January 2001, Sonus Networks acquired TTI in a stock-for-stock transaction by issuing 10.8 million shares. Following the merger, Anousheh Ansari became a vice president at Sonus, while Amir Ansari joined the Office of the CTO to support the deployment of the new voice infrastructure.

=== Prodea Systems and later ventures ===
After departing from Sonus, Amir Ansari and his family launched Prodea Systems in 2006, focusing on Internet of Things (IoT) and connected home technologies. As CTO, Ansari helped develop a unified platform—sometimes described as a “Residential OS”—that enabled consumers to manage smart-home devices and digital services through a single interface.

In 2020, he founded VaticX, a global hybrid accelerator that supports growth-stage startups with mentorship, market access, and funding. Ansari also entered academia as co-founder and inaugural executive director of xFoundry@UMD, an innovation incubator based at the University of Maryland’s E.A. Fernandez IDEA Factory. He leads student innovation and startup programs aimed at solving complex technology challenges.

== Philanthropy and space-related initiatives ==
On May 5, 2004, Amir and Anousheh Ansari made a multi-million-dollar donation to the Xprize Foundation, renaming its first major competition the Ansari X Prize. The $10 million challenge aimed to incentivize private space travel by requiring a reusable, crewed spacecraft to fly twice into space within two weeks. SpaceShipOne won the prize in October 2004, marking a historic milestone in commercial spaceflight.

Ansari currently serves on the Xprize Foundation's board of directors and its Vision Circle, helping shape incentive competitions that drive innovation across science and technology sectors.

In the mid-2000s, the Ansari family partnered with Space Adventures and Russia's federal space agency to create the Space Adventures Explorer, a commercial suborbital spacecraft. The goal was to build air-launched vehicles for private space tourism, with planned spaceports in the United Arab Emirates and Singapore. Although the initiative was eventually paused, it exemplified the family's pioneering vision in private space infrastructure.

Beyond space, Ansari has actively supported nonprofit initiatives in education and sustainable development. He frequently advocates for STEM education, leveraging his entrepreneurial experience to inspire innovation for social good.
