= Da Vinci Project =

Canadian spaceflight project

The da Vinci Project was a privately funded, volunteer-staffed attempt to launch a reusable crewed sub-orbital spacecraft. It was formed in 1996 specifically to be a contender for the Ansari X Prize for the first non-governmental reusable crewed spacecraft. The project was based in Toronto, Ontario, Canada and led by Brian Feeney.

The original da Vinci Project is no longer operating. A documentary was filmed throughout much of the project's life from 2000 through post-X Prize roundup footage in 2008. The documentary accumulated some 1000 hours or so of footage. It was a private undertaking by Michel Jones of Riverstone Productions, Toronto, and as of early 2009 was still in a preliminary stage of editing and completion.

The project last participated in the X Prize Cup 2005, displaying a mock-up of its Wild Fire MK Vl spacecraft.

== Spacecraft design ==
The project's design was a rocket-powered spacecraft to be air-launched from a helium balloon at an altitude of about 21 km (65,000 ft). The project scope included design and construction of both the spacecraft and the launching balloon. The chosen design can be described as a crewed rockoon.

== History and status ==
The project was established in 1996. It is named after Leonardo da Vinci, who, among innumerable other inventions, was the first recorded person to design an aircraft. The project was staffed entirely by volunteers.

The project unveiled a mockup of their spacecraft, Wild Fire, on August 5, 2004 at a hangar at Downsview Airport in Toronto. At this point, it was considered a contender for the Ansari X Prize, and Tier One had just given notice of their planned competitive flights. When announcing the unveiling, the da Vinci Project also appealed for funds to fly Wild Fire. An agreement was reached with GoldenPalace.com, and the project subsequently gave the required 60-day notice that they would make the Ansari X Prize competitive flights. GoldenPalace.com, known for its marketing gimmicks, was to place a soccer ball kicked out of the stadium by David Beckham during the 2004 Euro World Cup inside the space craft.

The da Vinci Project initially announced that it would fly first on October 2, 2004, launching from Kindersley, Saskatchewan. This was only three days after the first expected X Prize flight, by Scaled Composites, on September 29, 2004. However, on September 23, 2004 the da Vinci project announced that they would not be ready. Scaled Composites won the X Prize on October 4, 2004.

== Hardware ==
The rocket and support equipment was mostly COTS components with a hybrid propulsion system using nitrous oxide and a spin cast paraffin fuel engine in a re-loadable and expendable cardboard cartridge. The most notable development problem was finding a practical low cost solution to the thermal contraction of the liquid paraffin fuel when it cooled and solidified inside the cartridge inner casing. The capsule used two automotive racing seats and aviation BRS parachute systems and was designed and modeled with finite element software. The nozzle was carbon fiber exterior with a tough, thermally insulating inner coating. The combustion chamber was metallic, although a wound carbon fiber exterior was planned but never completed. The planned tracking system used a four car team with networked laptop computers using a hybrid cellular and shortwave radio with the capability of automatically predicting the landing spot so a support team could converge on the landing spot hand prior to landing. The highest forces were predicted to be at re-entry, peaking at approximately at up to 6G. Development, construction and testing continued in earnest until the second flight of the X Prize on October 4, 2004.

== Structure ==
The project had a small group of core area leaders and relied heavily on volunteer efforts. It followed a variety of business models including share ownership partners, technology partnerships, employee style volunteering, integrator as well as technology/IP aggregator. Many of the expensive components were donated by businesses in exchange for recognition on the website homepage, since removed.

== See also ==
- List of private spaceflight companies - A compiled list of private spaceflight companies
