= N-Prize =

International inducement prize for innovation toward space access

The N-Prize (the "N" stands for "Nanosatellite" or "Negligible Resources".) is an inducement prize contest intended to "encourage creativity, originality and inventiveness in the face of severe odds and impossible financial restrictions" and thus stimulate innovation directed towards obtaining cheap access to space. The competition was launched in 2008 by Cambridge biologist Paul H. Dear, and is intended specifically to spur amateur involvement in spaceflight as it is "aimed at amateurs, enthusiasts, would-be boffins and foolhardy optimists."

Dr. Dear died on 11 March 2020, and the prize was subsequently closed.

The challenge posed by the N-Prize is to launch a satellite weighing between 9.99 and 19.99 grammes into Earth orbit, and to track it for a minimum of nine orbits. Most importantly the launch budget must be under £999.99 including the launch vehicle, all of the required non-reusable launch equipment hardware, and propellant.

In order to be eligible for the awards the challenge initially had to be completed before 19:19:09 (GMT) on 19 September 2013, however later it was decided that the prize will remain open until won. Doing so will earn the winning team a prize of £9,999.99.

== List of competing teams ==
The official site of the N-Prize includes an animated page listing over fifty teams together with contact information and links to any team websites. Examples of teams that have entered the competition at one time or another and who also have or had web pages include:

- Nebula
- Epsilon Vee
- Vulcan
- Microlaunchers
- Cambridge University Spaceflight
- Potent Voyager
- Team Prometheus
- Team 9.99
- Kiwi 2 Space
- Qi Spacecraft
- Aerosplice
- WikiSat

== See also ==
- Ansari X Prize
- Rockoon
- List of space technology awards
