= Scaled Composites Tier One =

Suborbital human spaceflight program using the reusable spacecraft SpaceShipOne

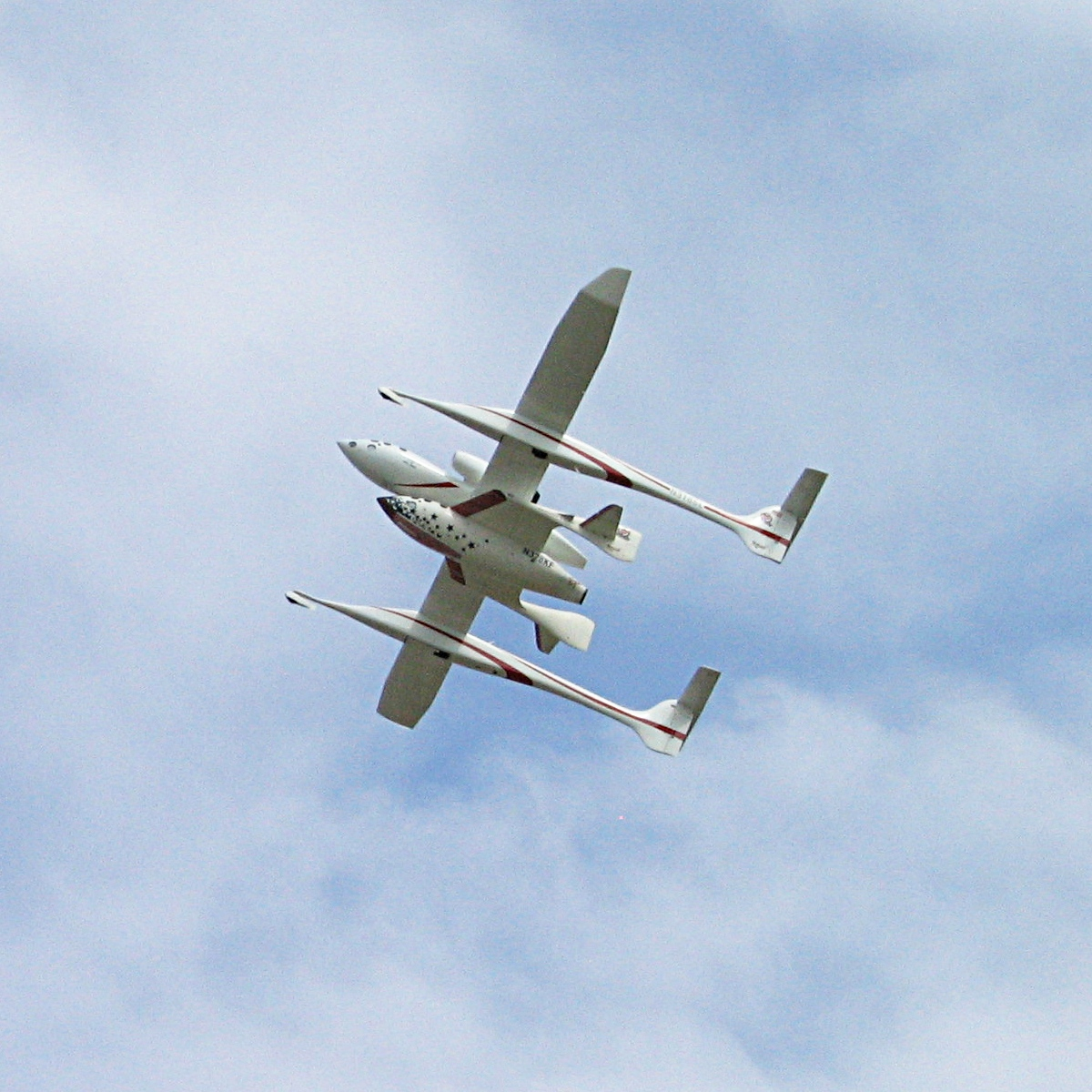
Space Ship One and White Knight

Tier One was a Scaled Composites' 1990s–2004 program of suborbital human spaceflight using the reusable spacecraft SpaceShipOne and its launcher White Knight. The craft was designed by Burt Rutan, and the project was funded with 20 million US dollars by Paul Allen. In 2004 it made the first privately funded human spaceflight and won the 10 million US dollars Ansari X Prize for the first non-governmental reusable crewed spacecraft.

The objective of the project was to develop technology for low-cost routine access to space. SpaceShipOne was not itself intended to carry paying passengers, but was envisioned that there would be commercial spinoffs, initially in space tourism. The company Mojave Aerospace Ventures was formed to manage commercial exploitation of the technology. A deal with Virgin Galactic could see routine space tourism in the late 2010s using a spacecraft based on Tier One technology. This led to Virgin Galactic's SpaceShipTwo program, which has concluded in June 2024 with only a few flights with tourists having taken place starting in 2023.

== Design ==
=== Program components ===
The design concept of Tier One was to air launch a three-person piloted spacecraft which climbs to slightly above 100 km (62 mi; 54 nmi) altitude using a hybrid rocket motor and then glides to the ground and lands horizontally. Scaled Composites lists the following components of the program:

- launch aircraft (White Knight)
- three-seater human-rated spacecraft (SpaceShipOne)
- hybrid rocket propulsion system
- mobile propulsion test facility
- flight simulator
- inertial-nav flight director
- mobile mission control center
- spacecraft systems
- pilot training program
- flight test program
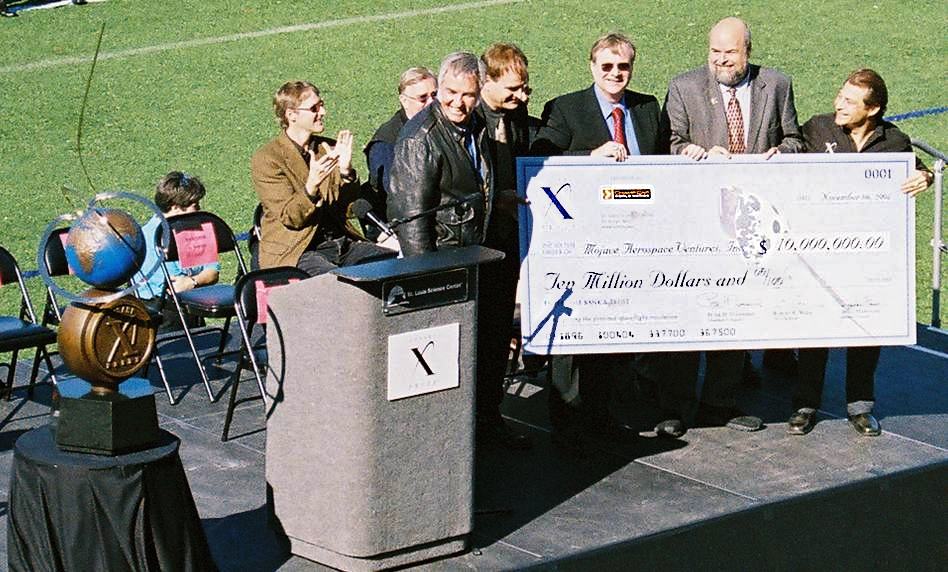
Representatives of the X Prize Foundation symbolically presented the ten million dollar prize to Burt Rutan and Paul Allen of Mojave Aerospace Ventures on November 6, 2004. The Ansari X Prize trophy is on the left.

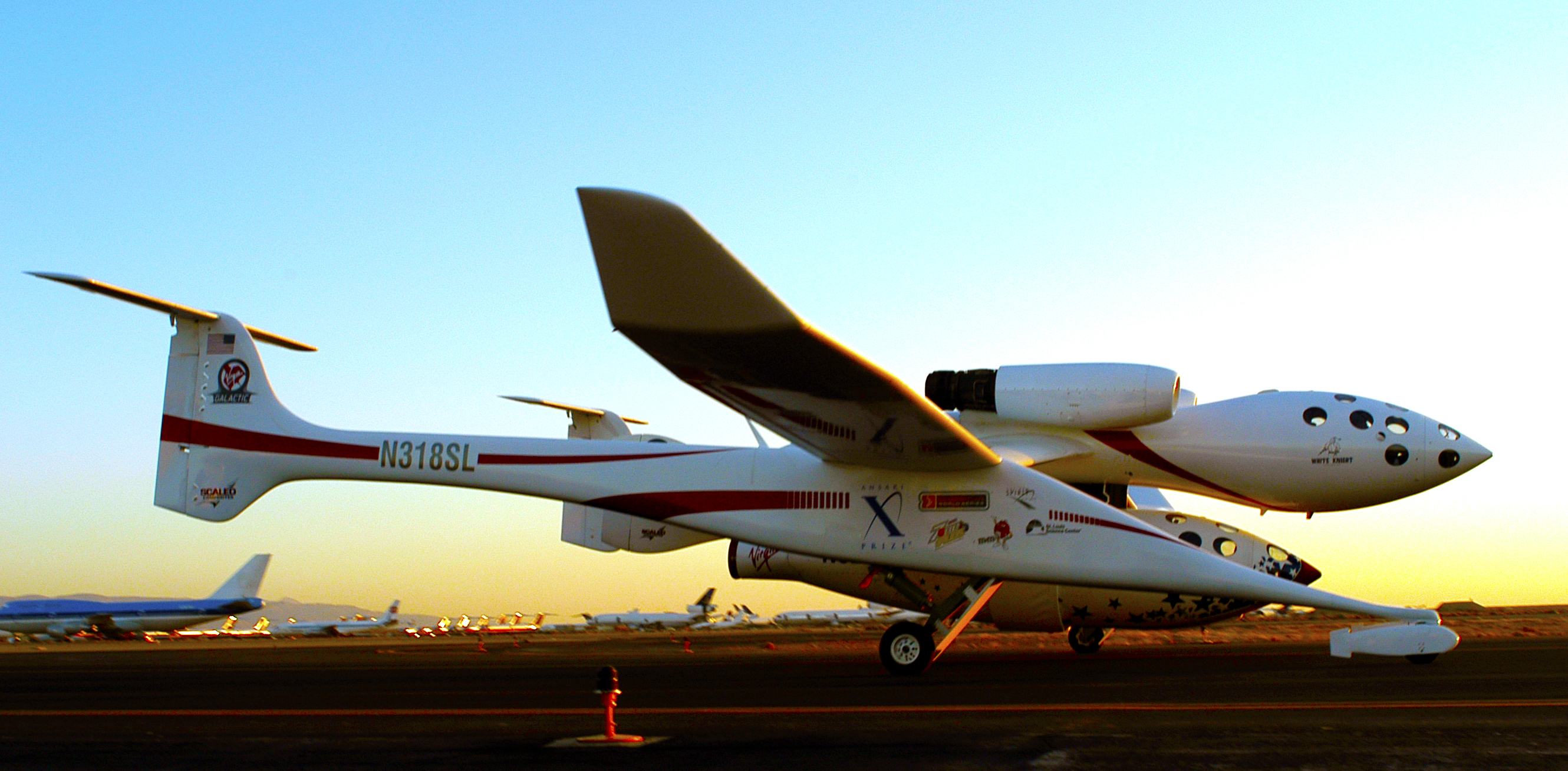
SpaceShipOne Flight 16P taxi pre launch

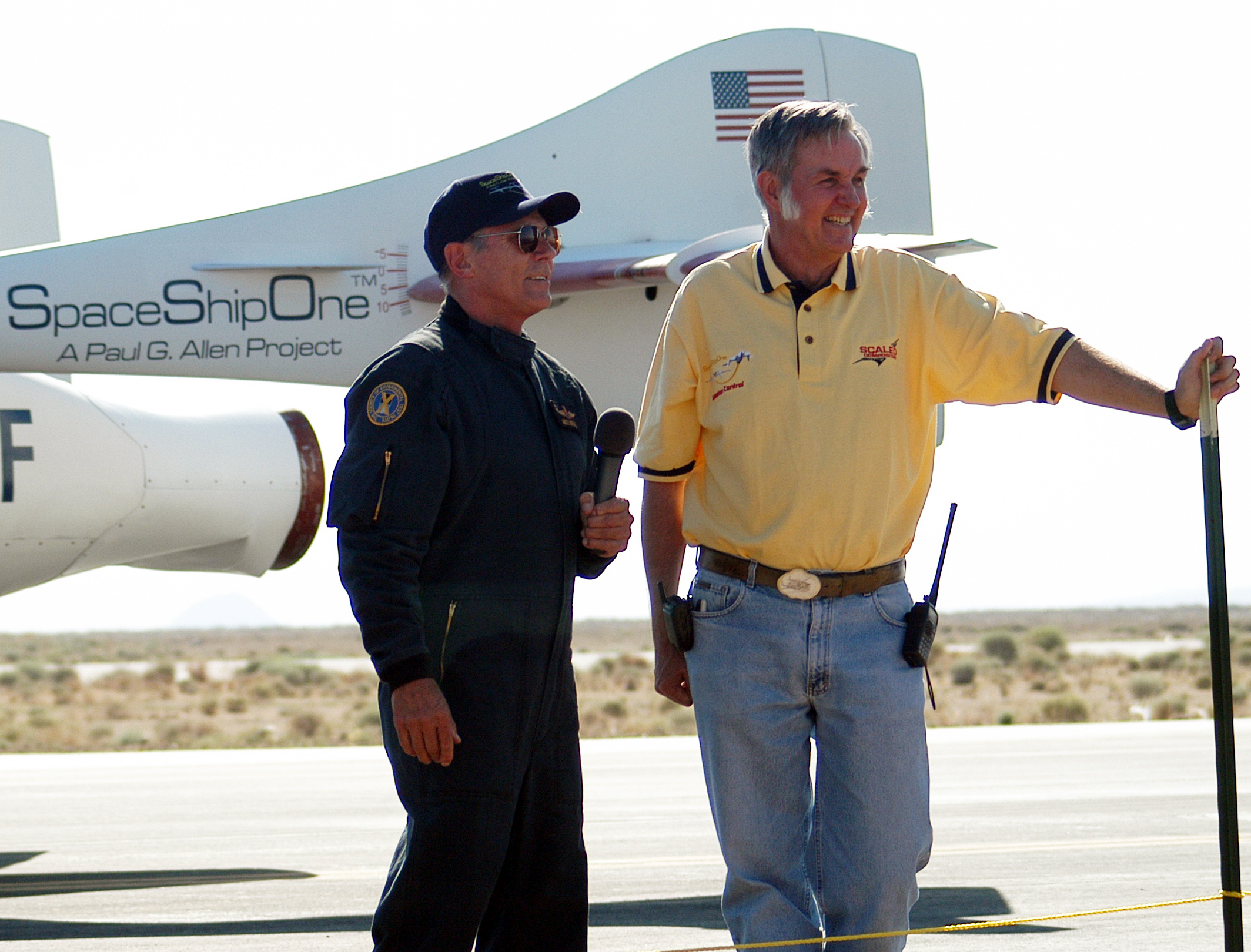
Mike Melvill and Burt Rutan speak to the media after the first flight into space

=== Mission control ===
In addition to an office-based mission control, Tier One has a mobile mission control center. This is relatively small, built into a large road-going truck. It bears the Scaled Composites logo, but no other overt indication of its link to Tier One. The vehicle performs a combination of support functions:

- telemetry monitoring and recording
- telecommunications
- auxiliary environment control for White Knight and SpaceShipOne

This control center is used to support both rocket motor ground tests and all flight tests of White Knight and SpaceShipOne. Its primary function is to monitor and record test data, and to this end it is equipped with computers and radio communication gear. SpaceShipOne's avionics displays are duplicated in mission control. Telemetry data is received on a data reduction system (DRS), which automatically directs radio antennas to point at the craft being monitored. The telemetry system has a range of about 280 km (170 mi).

The control center is equipped to communicate with Scaled Composites' offices, as well as the aircraft and spacecraft.

The control center maintains a temperature-controlled atmosphere for its staff, and can be hooked up to provide temperature control for the White Knight and SpaceShipOne cabins. The physical structure of mission control also provides easier access to the White Knight cabin.

=== Nitrous oxide delivery ===
Unlike the solid fuel, the nitrous oxide oxidiser is handled as a bulk commodity and pumped into the spacecraft's oxidiser tank in the field. Tier One therefore has a mobile delivery system for nitrous oxide, which they call MONODS (mobile nitrous oxide delivery system).

The MONODS is built on an open trailer, which can be carried by road in conventional manner. It consists principally of a 6.5 m^{3} (230 cu ft) tank, a temperature control unit, and a generator to power the temperature control unit. The nitrous oxide is stored at room temperature, at a pressure of 4.8 MPa (700 psi).

The MONODS is refilled from a commercial supplier, which uses 50 m^{3} (1,800 cu ft) tankers and delivers the nitrous oxide at about −17 °C (1 °F) and 2 MPa (290 psi). The MONODS heats the nitrous oxide to room temperature, increasing its pressure.

=== Propulsion testing ===
Tier One has a mobile thrust test stand, known as the test stand trailer (TST). The advantage of making it mobile is that all the mounting and instrumentation work can be done in the hangar, so that at the test site all that needs to be done is to fill the oxidiser tank (from the MONODS) and conduct the firing.

The test stand replicates the essential structural components of the spacecraft. It has an oxidiser tank and associated fittings identical to the one used in flight. This means that the motor test also automatically performs appropriate vibration, stress, and heat tests of the spacecraft structure. The crew cabin, however, is not replicated.

For ground-based thrust tests, a rocket nozzle with an expansion ratio of 10:1 is used, differing from the 25:1 nozzle used at altitude during actual flight.

The test stand is instrumented to record not only thrust but also side force and temperature and strain experienced by components. Data is recorded on a computer in a bunker at the test site. The data acquisition computer is remotely controlled from mission control.

=== Flight simulator ===
The SpaceShipOne flight simulator consists of a simulator program and a cockpit.

The flight simulator program aims to accurately simulate SpaceShipOne's behaviour under any circumstances and in all phases of flight. Rather than having a model of SpaceShipOne's overall flight behaviour, it uses computational fluid dynamics to model the air around the craft. It calculates the aerodynamic and other forces operating on the craft, taking into account the positions of its control surfaces. This simulation is based on the computer modelling that was used during the design process and refined using data from flight tests. This yields a highly accurate image of craft behaviour, even in unanticipated modes of flight. (This is one of the first modern aircraft to be designed without wind tunnel testing.)

The cockpit replica is on a static base, and so cannot accurately reproduce the equilibrioceptive and accelerative aspects of flight. However, White Knight is equipped to operate as a high-fidelity moving-base simulator. The simulator cockpit is an accurate copy of the SpaceShipOne cabin, including its avionics. It is the system of pilot plus avionics, not just the pilot, that is being simulated to. The flight simulator program drives the sensor inputs that are used by the avionics, and also drives twelve display computers which use commercial graphics software to generate high-resolution images of the outside view for the pilot. These views appear on eleven monitors and one projector screen. Stick force feedback is not simulated in real time.

Ground-based flight simulation is not only used for pilot training. It is also used to train ground crew, develop procedures, and test the avionics software and hardware.

== History and status ==
According to Scaled Composites, the concept for the program originated in April 1996, preliminary development began in 1999, and full development began in April 2001. It was initially kept secret, even after White Knight first flew on August 1, 2002. The program was announced to the public on April 18, 2003, when the program was ready to flight-test SpaceShipOne. Its first flight test, SpaceShipOne flight 01C, took place on May 20, 2003.

After months of glide tests, the first powered flight, SpaceShipOne flight 11P, was made on December 17, 2003. Further powered tests followed, reaching increasing altitudes, culminating on June 21, 2004 with the first privately funded human spaceflight, SpaceShipOne flight 15P. Ansari X Prize competitive flights followed. SpaceShipOne flight 16P on September 29, 2004 and SpaceShipOne flight 17P on October 4, 2004 were successful competitive flights, winning the X Prize.

The Tier One program run by Scaled Composites concluded after the retirement of SpaceShipOne, transitioning to a successor program for customer Virgin Galactic.

== Funding ==
The costs of development, construction, and operation of Tier One, although not publicly released, are estimated to be in the range of 20 million to 30 million US dollars, roughly two to three times the value of the Ansari X Prize award. The sole sponsor, initially secret, was revealed to be Paul Allen, a co-founder of Microsoft and the 48th richest person in the world. The revelation, on December 17, 2003, the same day as the program's first powered flight test, followed speculation that Allen was involved.

Some commentators have drawn comparisons between the relative inexpense of the Tier One program and the high cost of the Space Shuttle program, though the technological difficulties of the two programs are completely different. SpaceShipOne, because it flies suborbitally, does not need to reach the high speeds of the Space Shuttle (Mach 3 vs. Mach 25), nor the same altitude (100 km (62 mi) suborbital vs. 400 km (250 mi) orbit). SpaceShipOne also does not carry the same crew (3 members vs. 7) or payload (negligible vs. 25 tons), and makes much shorter flights (a few minutes vs. several days). The SpaceShipOne program is a technical achievement more on a par with the X-15 than the Shuttle.

Inflation adjusted comparisons of the SpaceShipOne program with that of the X-15 budget, indicate that the Tier One program cost 1/100 that of the X-15 program, although the three X-15 aircraft made almost 200 test flights in their entire test program, typically exploring hypersonic flight between mach 4-7. Only a few dozen X-15 flights specifically sought to reach peak altitudes rather than achieve top speeds, though only two flights ever reached altitudes near those achieved by SpaceShipOne. On the other hand, the Tier One project also paid for construction of the White Knight mothership within its budget, while NASA had nearly free use of a pre-existing USAF B-52 bomber modified to perform drop tests of experimental aircraft of many kinds (currently in use for PegasusXL launches).

== Publicity ==
Tier One was initially developed secretly, as is Scaled Composites' policy with new programs. On April 18, 2003 the program was publicly announced, and SpaceShipOne and White Knight were demonstrated to the media at a rollout attended by between 550 and 600 people. Media interest was so intense that what had been intended as a Family and Friends Day on April 24, 2003 was turned into a second media day.

Scaled Composites again courted publicity by announcing in advance the final test flight, SpaceShipOne flight 15P, intended to be the program's first spaceflight. About 11,000 people went to Mojave Spaceport to watch the flight, which was also televised. The flight was run as an airshow, with both the principal craft and the chase planes making takeoffs and landings in front of the crowd, and celebratory flybys when the test succeeded. The flight was not only a technical success but also a popular success, stimulating intense public interest in spaceflight.

== Future ==
During an interview in the documentary Black Sky: The Race For Space, Rutan stated that Tier One will cover suborbital flights, Tier Two will cover orbital flights, and Tier Three will cover flights beyond Earth's orbit (including flights to the moon and other planets). In the same documentary he displayed designs for an orbital craft based on SpaceShipOne, which had a rocket roughly twice SpaceShipOne's length mounted to the ship's rear.

== Commercial aspects ==
The stated objective of the Tier One program is to demonstrate suborbital human spaceflight operations at low cost. Before Burt Rutan began considering this project, there were three major barriers to the goal of affordable suborbital spaceflight:

- the dangers and costs of liquid propulsion fuels (they explode);
- the uncontrollable nature of solid fuel rocket motors (can not be turned off);
- the difficulties in getting back without burning up in the atmosphere.

Tier One itself is not intended to carry paying passengers, and US Government permits would be required if it did intend to do so. It is a technology testbed, and it is expressly intended that the technology developed in the program will later be used in commercial spaceflights. To that end, Allen and Rutan created a company, Mojave Aerospace Ventures, which owns the project's intellectual property and manages all commercial exploitation of it.

Scaled Composites initially expressed a hope that by about 2013 it would be possible for members of the public to experience a suborbital flight for about the price of a luxury cruise. On September 25, 2004, a deal was struck with Virgin Galactic to develop the Virgin SpaceShip based on a scaled-up version of SpaceShipOne. These spacecraft are to be built by The Spaceship Company.
