= Geoffrey Notkin =

American actor, author, and entrepreneur

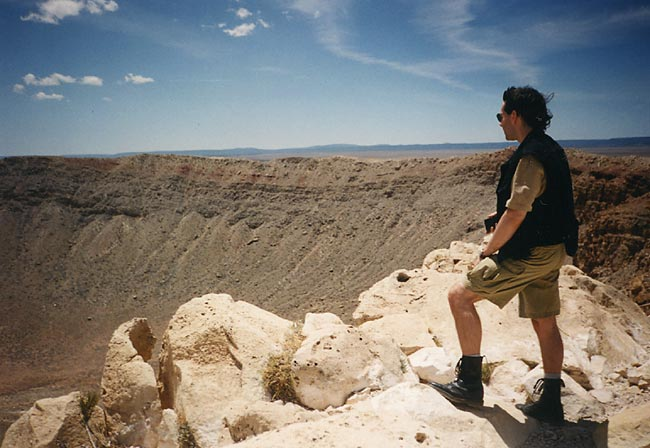
- Notkin at the rim of Meteor Crater in Flagstaff, Arizona
- Born: Geoffrey Notkin; February 1, 1961 (age 65); New York City
- Education: School of Visual Arts (BFA)
- Occupations: Actor, science writer, musician, photographer
- Years active: 1977–present
- Known for: Meteorite Men; STEM Journals
- Website: geoffnotkin.com

Geoffrey Notkin (born February 1, 1961) is an American actor, author, and entrepreneur. Notkin is known as one of the hosts of Meteorite Men, a documentary reality television series from Science Channel, which ran for three seasons. He is the president of the National Space Society, and holds a seat on the National Space Society Board of Governors. He is a long-time member of The Explorer's Club. In 2013, Notkin's Twitter account was nominated for a Shorty Award, honoring the best in social media. Notkin has also been interviewed on the Today show, Coast to Coast, and NASA Edge TV, and is a regular guest speaker at TusCon, an intimate science fiction, fantasy, and horror convention held annually in Tucson, Arizona.

== Early life ==
Notkin was born in New York City, but spent his childhood in and around London, England. Notkin spent several of his formative years in Purley, Surrey and attended school in Croydon and St John's Wood.

His parents were Sam Notkin, a twice-decorated World War II veteran who worked for the Port Authority, and Gay Flint Notkin, who worked for the American Embassy in Paris, the Rockefeller Foundation in New York, and the State Department. Notkin credits his father, an amateur astronomer, for his interest in space and meteorites.

Notkin left England at age 19 and lived in New York City, later attending New York City's School of Visual Arts (SVA), where he studied under renowned cartoonists Will Eisner and Harvey Kurtzman. Notkin eventually became the editor of Will Eisner's Gallery of New Comics for SVA.

After graduating college, Notkin worked at RAW Books & Graphics for owners Art Spiegelman and Françoise Mouly. Notkin later became a production assistant to Art Spiegelman while he was creating his graphic novel, Maus, for which Spiegelman later won the Pulitzer Prize. Notkin inspired one of Spiegelman's Garbage Pail Kids, "Deaf Geoff."

Notkin worked as a geologist for a year with an American oil exploration company based in London.

== Career ==
=== Music ===
In 1976, at age 15, Notkin attended his first concert with childhood friend Neil Gaiman, to which he attributes his love of music. In 1977, age 16, Notkin was the drummer for a punk rock band, Ex-Execs, whose members included Graham K. Smith, Al Kingsbury, and Gaiman. In fact, the lead character in Gaiman's short story and film, How to Talk to Girls at Parties, was inspired by Notkin.

As part of the punk rock scene in London and New York, Notkin performed at The Rock Garden in Covent Garden, the Fulham Greyhound, CBGB, The Stone Pony, and The Knitting Factory. Notkin remained a professional musician for over 20 years and worked with many artists, among them singer-songwriter Lach, with whom he formed a band called Proper iD; drummer Billy Ficca of Television; and Anne Husick of Band of Susans. Notkin appeared on four albums with Lach, including Blang! in 1997, produced by Richard Barone, which Billy Ficca also appeared on. Other albums Notkin performed on are:

- Contender (1989)
- Kids Fly Free (2001)
- Lach Today (2004)

=== Meteorite hunting ===
Notkin's first meteorite hunt was in 1994 at Meteor Crater in Northern Arizona, followed in 1997 by a joint expedition to the Imilac strewnfield in the Atacama Desert with Steve Arnold, whom he met through email. Notkin has participated in meteorite hunting expeditions across the United States, including the famed Odessa Meteor Crater, Gold Basin in Arizona, and Brenham, Kansas, where Steve Arnold found the main mass of the Brenham meteorite.

Meteorite hunting lead Notkin to attend his first Tucson Gem & Mineral Show in 1998, which he has attended every year since and where his meteorite company, Aerolite Meteorites, now exhibits.

"I was so taken in with the experience of the city and the gem show," Notkin said. "As a kid, I would implore my parents to stop at roadside rock shops. Coming here for the first time, it was like a whole city of rock shops. Since then, I haven't missed a show in 22 years."

=== Aerolite Meteorites, Inc. ===
In 2005, Notkin established Aerolite Meteorites, an international meteorite company offering a wide range of products, from entry-level to museum quality specimens. Aerolite has supplied a genuine iron meteorite for use in The Wolverine (2013), though footage of the meteorite was ultimately cut from the film. Aerolite also supplied an iron meteorite weighing 88 pounds (40 kg) as a birthday present for Sting.

Notkin and his company, Aerolite Meteorites, are supporters of Beads of Courage, a Tucson-based charity that aims to provide supportive arts-based care programs for children coping with serious illness. Notkin is a Carry a Bead celebrity participant and carried handcrafted beads with him while filming episodes for STEM Journals.

=== Meteorite Men ===
Notkin co-hosted the critically acclaimed Science Channel show Meteorite Men with Steve Arnold, a fellow meteorite hunter. The show ran for three seasons and shot episodes in 11 countries, including Chile, Sweden, Poland, and Australia.

Arnold and Notkin first met via email correspondence before embarking on a meteorite hunting expedition in the Atacama Desert in Chile in 1997. Notkin's written account of this trip was published in two parts in distinguished mathematician and meteorite specialist Joel Schiff's ‘’Meteorite’’ magazine in May 1998 and August 1998.

Meteorite Men won two bronze Telly Awards for Season 1 and Season 2.

=== Stem Journals ===
Stem Journals is a science educational television show on Cox7 Arizona which Notkin hosted from 2013 to 2014. In 2014, the show won a Rocky Mountain Emmy and Bronze and Silver Telly Awards.

=== In Spaceflight ===
In 2012, Notkin hand-selected a meteorite to be donated by his company, Aerolite Meteorites, Inc., as a part of the first-place trophy for the third annual Student NewSpace Business Plan Competition, which took place at the SpaceVision conference, organized by SEDS-USA.

In 2013, Notkin was named "Stellar Partner of the Year" by Challenger Space Center Arizona for his work in supporting STEM education programs at the center, as well as for his exhibit, "They Came from Outer Space," which was featured in the main exhibit room at the center for two years.

On November 14, 2015, Notkin gave a TEDx Talk at Institut Le Rosey in Switzerland titled Meteorites: Life, Death, and Hope on Earth.

In 2015, Notkin emceed the regional edition of NASA FameLab, a global competition featuring early career scientists with the intent to nurture the skills necessary to communicate science-related topics to a public audience. The competition was held in Arizona at Phoenix Comicon 2015.

Notkin holds a position on the Board of Governors of the National Space Society and is often a keynote speaker at the International Space Development Conference, an annual spaceflight event hosted by the NSS. He is also writes a column for Ad Astra magazine, the official publication of the NSS, titled "Throwing Pebbles at the Sky."

In addition to being president of the National Space Society and holding a position on its Board of Governors, Notkin also serves on the Board of Directors of the Astrosociology Research Institute and as an adviser to Deep Space Industries. Notkin is also currently involved with Megafonzie, a new multi-platform science network.

Asteroid 132904, discovered at Mount Palomar in California by astrophysicist and fellow meteorite specialist Robert Mason, was named "Notkin" in honor of his work in science education.

Notkin has participated in several spaceflight events and conferences, notably Space Rocks. The pilot event took place on April 22, 2018, at the O2 Arena in London and celebrated advances in spaceflight and the art, music, and culture they inspire. Space Rocks won Best Event at the 2018 Progressive Music Awards, hosted by Prog Magazine.

Notkin is also involved with Taking Up Space, an organization dedicated to expanding educational and vocational opportunities for Native American girls by keeping them interested in STEM fields and ultimately sending them to Space Camp. In 2018, Notkin was the emcee for a fundraising event held in Tucson, Arizona, featuring guitarist Gabriel Ayala.

Other spaceflight events with which Notkin has been associated include:

- Star Stuff
- Spacefest
- AZ SciTech Festival
- Planetary Defense Conference

== Film and television ==
Year	Title	Credited as				Notes	Ref.
Year	Title	Writer	Director	Producer	Role	Notes	Ref.
2001	The Impressionists				Himself	TV mini-series documentary	
2006	Cash & Treasures				Himself	TV series	
2007	Wired Science				Himself	"Face Reader", episode #1.4	
2007	How Earth Made Us				Himself	Documentary	
2009	How the Earth Was Made				Himself	"Asteroids"	
2009	Radio Free Albemuth			Associate Producer		Film adaptation	
2010	American Chopper: The Series				Himself	"Meteorite Men Bike"	
2009–2012	Meteorite Men				Host	TV series	
2013	Spacing Out!				Himself	"A Redefined Habitable Zone"	
2013	NASA Edge				Himself	"Planetary Defense"	
2013	Ancient Aliens				Himself	"Mysterious Relics"	
2013–2015	The STEM Journals				Host	TV series	
2016	Neil Gaiman: Dream Dangerously			Executive Producer	Himself, art department	Documentary	
2017	Action Scientist Asteroid Day Diary				Himself	Video documentary short	
2018	Revenge of Zoe			Producer and Music Supervisor	Customer #7	Feature film	
2018	First to the Moon: The Story of Apollo 8			Producer		Documentary	

== Books ==
Year	Title	Publisher	ISBN	Notes	Reference
2006	Duty, Honor, and Valor	Wheatmark	9781587366802	"As We Say in French," p. 198-205	
2011	Meteorite Hunting: How to Find Treasure From Space	Stanegate Press	9780984754847	Meteorite Hunting: How to Find Treasure From Space won a Bronze Independent Publisher's (IPPY) Award in 2012.	
2012	Rock Star: Adventures of a Meteorite Man	Stanegate Press	9780984754823		
2015	My Incredibly Strange and Amazing Real-Life Adventures in the World of Comic Books	Stanegate Press	9780984754878	Illustrations by Roman Casillas	
2019	How To Find Treasure From Space: The Expert Guide to Meteorite Hunting and Identification	Stanegate Press	9780984754885	Illustrations by Antonia Andros, photographs by Geoff Notkin and Christian B. Meza	

=== Other publications ===
Notkin has also written articles for digital and print international publications, including:

- Geology.com
- Sky & Telescope
- Meteorite magazine
- MeteoriteBlog.org

== See also ==
- Tucson Gem & Mineral Show
- Coliseum Mineral, Fossil, Gem, and Jewelry Show
- Meteorite hunting
- Spaceflight
