= Space Pioneer Awards =

Space Pioneer Awards or NSS Space Pioneer Awards are the annual awards given by National Space Society, an independent non-profit educational membership organisation, to individuals and teams who have opened the space frontier.

The awards are given in 13 categories. Generally, three or more Space Pioneer awards are given per year, so not every category is awarded each year.

== Categories ==
The 13 categories in which award could be given are:

1. Business / Corporate
2. Business / Entrepreneur
3. Compelling Art
4. Educator / Education
5. Government Service (Non-legislative)
6. Government Service (Legislative)
7. Mass Media
8. Public Awareness
9. Scientist / Engineer
10. Service to the Space Community
11. Space Development
12. Special Merit
13. Wide Media

=== List of recipients ===
- 1988 - Craig Covault [Wide Media]
- 1988 - Thomas Rogers [Scientist/Engineer]
- 1988 - Doug Morrow, Richard MacLeod, U.S. Space Foundation [Mass Media]
- 1988 - Rep. George Brown, Jr. [Government Service (Legislative)]
- 1988 - Kamil Naguib, World Aerospace Education Foundation [Education]
- 1988 - Dermot Burke and the Princeton Ballet for “A Tribute” [Compelling Art]
- 1988 - Byron Lichtenberg [Business/Entrepreneur]
- 1988 - Gilbert W. Keyes, Boeing [Business/Corporate]
- 1989 - Wendell Mendell [Scientist/Engineer]
- 1989 - Sen. Jake Garn [Government Service (Legislative)]
- 1989 - The Challenger Center [Education]
- 1989 - Pat Rawlings [Compelling Art]
- 1989 - James Bennett [Business/Entrepreneur]
- 1989 - 3M Corporation [Business/Corporate]
- 1990 - Lyman Spitzer, Jr. [Scientist/Engineer]
- 1990 - Rep. Ron Packard [Government Service (Legislative)]
- 1990 - Virginia's Center for Innovative Technology [Business/Entrepreneur]
- 1990 - Orbital Sciences Corporation [Business/Corporate]
- 1991 - K. Eric Drexler [Space Development]
- 1991 - Women in Aerospace [Public Awareness]
- 1992 - Sen. Barbara Mikulski [Government Service (Legislative)]
- 1992 - Barbara Morgan [Education]
- 1992 - Westinghouse Electric Corporation Commercial and Civil Space Division [Business/Corporate]
- 1993 - Dr. Daniel Goldin [Special Merit]
- 1993 - McDonnell Douglas Space Systems Delta Clipper Team [Business/Corporate]
- 1994 - Tim Kyger [Special Merit]
- 1994 - Dr. Stewart Nozette [Scientist/Engineer]
- 1995 - Dr. Mark Albrecht [Special Merit]
- 1995 - General Daniel Graham [Special Merit]
- 1995 - Glenn Heinmiller [Mass Media]
- 1996 - Peter Diamandis [Special Merit]
- 1996 - Jeff Kluger [Mass Media]
- 1996 - Charlie Chafer [Business/Entrepreneur]
- 1997 - Lori Garver [Special Merit]
- 1997 - Mars meteorite team [Scientist/Engineer]
- 1997 - Rep. James Sensenbrenner, for Commercial Space Act of 1997 [Government Service (Legislative)]
- 1997 - Greg Allison [Business/Entrepreneur]
- 1998 - Alan Binder [Scientist/Engineer]
- 1998 - George French for MoonLink [Business/Entrepreneur]
- 2001 - Dr. Robert Farquhar, Mission Director, and the Near Earth Asteroid Rendezvous (NEAR) Mission Team [Scientist/Engineer]
- 2001 - Leonard David [Mass Media]
- 2004 - Randall Severy [Special Merit - Space Activist of the Year]
- 2004 - Gary Pearce Barnhard [Special Merit - Space Activist of the Year]
- 2004 - Rep. Sherwood Boehlert [Government Service (Legislative)]
- 2005 - Dr. Boris Smeds, ESA, for Cassini/Huygens mission [Scientist/Engineer]
- 2005 - Mars Exploration Rover Team, accepted by Dr. Steven Squyres [Scientist/Engineer]
- 2005 - Paul Allen [Business/Entrepreneur]
- 2006 - Michael Griffin [Space Development]
- 2006 - JAXA HAYABUSA (MUSES-C) Mission Team [Scientist/Engineer]
- 2006 - Elon Musk [Business/Entrepreneur]
- 2007 - Heinz-Hermann Koelle [Special Merit]
- 2007 - Kenneth Cox [Space Development]
- 2008 - Patricia Grace Smith [Government Service (Non-legislative)]
- 2008 - Al Globus [Education]
- 2008 - Anita E. Gale [Education]
- 2008 - "The Caballeros" Col. Mike Hornitschek, USAF, Col. M.V. “Coyote” Smith, USAF, Lt. Col. Peter Garretson, USAF, Lt. Col. Paul Damphousse, USMC, and Gen. James Armor (Ret.) [Space Development]
- 2009 - Russell L. Schweickart [Historic Space Achievement]
- 2009 - Brian G. Marsden [Service to the Space Community]
- 2009 - John C. Mankins [Space Development]
- 2009 - Indian Space Research Organization (ISRO) [Science and Engineering]
- 2010 - NASA-Ames LCROSS Mission Team [Science and Engineering]
- 2010 - George T. Whitesides [Service to the Space Community]
- 2010 - Ray D. Bradbury [Mass Media]
- 2011 - George T. Whitesides [Service to the Space Community]
- 2011 - Gordon R. Woodcock [Lifetime of Service to the Space Community]
- 2011 - Paul Spudis [Scientific or Engineering Paper]
- 2011 - X-51A Waverider Team [Science and Engineering]
- 2011 - Robert Bigelow [Space Development]
- 2011 - Elon Musk [Business Entrepreneur]
- 2015 - Indian Space Research Organisation (ISRO), (Mars Orbiter Mission)
- 2018 - Thomas Mueller [Science and Engineering]
- 2019 — Eileen Collins [Historic Space Achievement], Gerald Griffin [Service to the Space Community], Jeffrey Manber [Entrepreneurship], Miles O'Brien [Mass Media], Dr. Martine A. Rothblatt [Entrepreneurship], Peter G. Wilhelm [Science and Engineering], Alfred M. Worden [Historic Space Achievement]
- 2020 - Isaac Arthur [Education via Mass Media], Steve Jurvetson [Space Entrepreneurship], Dr. Peggy Whitson [Current Space Achievements], Mission Juno Team, Dr. Scott J. Bolton [Science and Engineering], Dr. Phil Plait [Mass Media]
- 2021 — Dr. Robert D. Braun [Science and Engineering], Robert Manning [Science and Engineering]
- 2022 — Peter Beck, Rocket Lab [Science and Technology], Kathryn Lueders [Non-Legislative Government Service], Ingenuity Mars Helocopter Team [Science and Technology]
- 2023 — Jared Isaacman [Historic Space Achievement], Dr. Pascal Lee [Science and Engineering], Dr. David Livingston [Mass Media]
- 2024 — Rod Pyle [Mass Media in Print], Brian McManus [Electronic Mass Media], José M. Hernández [NASA Service and Science]

== See also ==
- List of space technology awards
