= L5 =

L5 or L-5 may refer to:

== Entertainment ==
- L5 (band), French female pop music group
- L5 Games, video games developer published by Gravity Interactive
- Gibson L5, electric guitar
- "Home on Lagrange (The L5 Song)", a filk song

== Science ==
- Haplogroup L5 (mtDNA), human mitochondrial DNA haplogroup
- L5, the fifth lumbar vertebra
- Lagrangian point 5 in an astronomical solar system
- Lp space for p=5
- Ribosomal protein L5, a human gene
- Ubiquitin carboxyl-terminal hydrolase L5, a human gene

== Transportation ==
- GPS L5, a GPS signal
- Stinson L-5 Sentinel, aircraft used by the United States Army Air Forces in World War II
- Barcelona Metro line 5
- HMS L5, a 1917 British L class submarine
- Junkers L5, a 1920s German six-cylinder, water-cooled, inline aircraft engine
- PRR L5, an American electric locomotive
- SP&S Class L-5, an 1897 steam locomotives class
- Strv L-5, a 1929 Swedish tank designed by Landsverk
- USS L-5 (SS-44), a 1916 United States Navy L-class submarine
- L5, an S-Bahn line of the Léman Express in Switzerland

== Other uses ==
- L5 Society, a society promoting Dr. Gerard K. O'Neill's vision of space colonization
- ISO/IEC 8859-9 (Latin-5), an 8-bit character encoding

== See also ==
- 5L (disambiguation)
- Level 5 (disambiguation)
