= Pat Rawlings =

American illustrator and artist

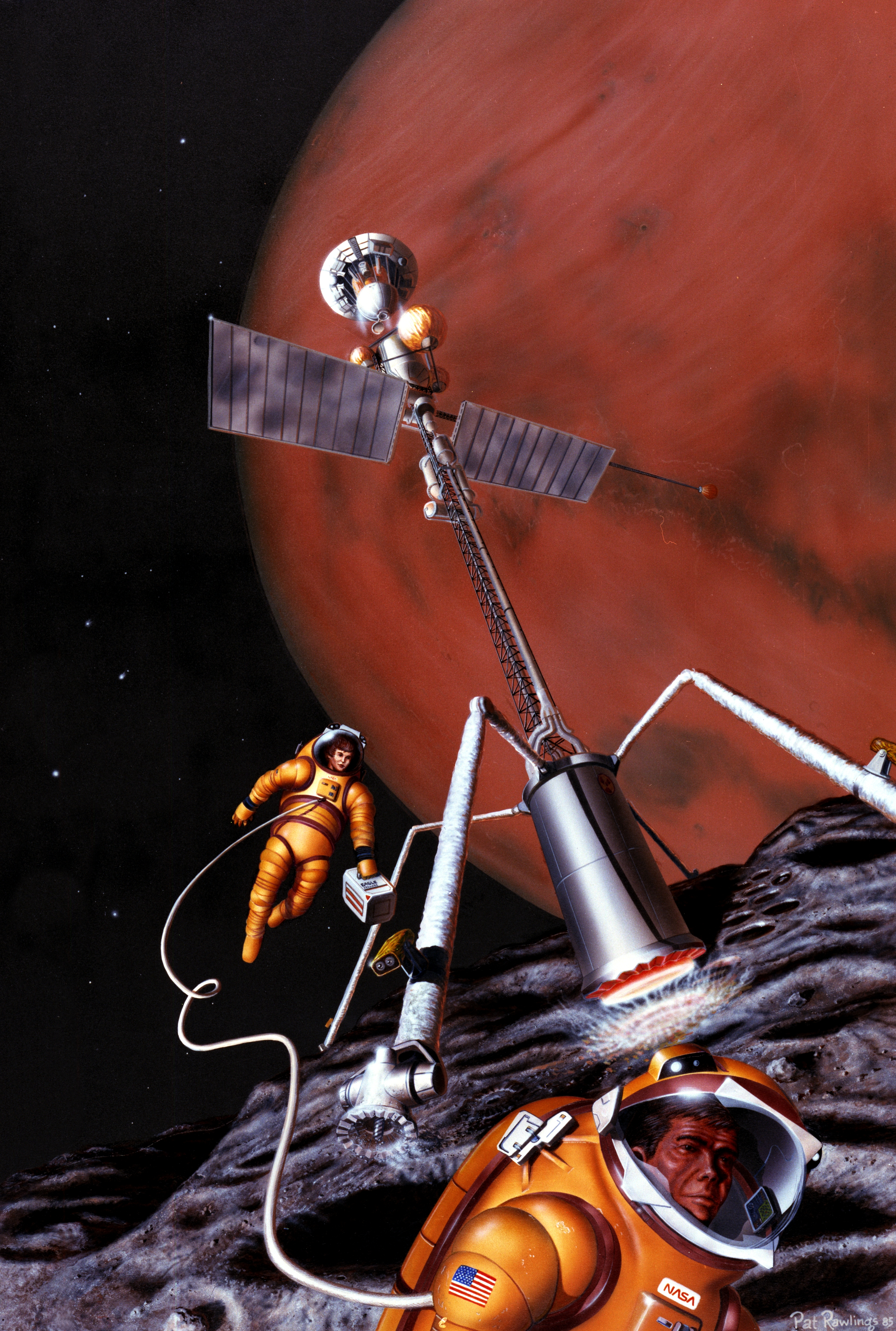
Fuel is mined from Phobos with the help of a nuclear reactor. (Pat Rawlings, 1986)

Patrick Rawlings (born 1955) is an American technical illustrator and space artist. Since 1970s his illustrations related to spaceflight featured in hundreds of books and magazines, as well as in film and television. His process combines traditional art and digital art; he refers to the result by the term "tradigital art", originally coined by Judith Moncrieff.

Pat Rawlings is a B.A. in Art earned from the University of Houston–Clear Lake. He is a Charter Fellow, and Trustee of the International Association of Astronomical Artists.

He is the 1989 recipient of the Space Pioneer Awards from the National Space Society in "Compelling Art" category.

He lives in the Texas Hill Country with his wife Linda.
