= L55 =

L55 or variation, may refer to:

- Aer Lualdi L.55, a helicopter
- Daihatsu L55, a kei-car
- Junkers L55, a V-12 engine
- Rheinmetall Rh-120, L55 subtype; a 120mm gun
- 5.2 cm SK L/55 naval gun, a naval gun
- Scania-Vabis L55, a truck
- L55 train set (bullet train), an E3 Series Shinkansen
- HMS L55, an L-class submarine of the British Royal Navy
- HMS Winchester (L55), a W-class destroyer of the British Royal Navy

== See also ==
- L5 (disambiguation)
- LLV (disambiguation)
- I55
- 155 (disambiguation)
- 55 (disambiguation)
