= YurView Arizona =

Cable TV channel in Arizona, United States

- Country: United States
- Broadcast area: Arizona
- Headquarters: Atlanta, Georgia, United States

Programming
- Language: English
- Picture format: 1080p/720p (HDTV); 480i (SDTV/16:9 letterboxed)

Ownership
- Owner: Cox Communications

History
- Launched: October 1, 1981
- Former names: ASPN (1981–1996); Cox Sports (1996–1998); Cox 9 (1998–2004); Cox 7 (2004–2017)

Links
- Website: www.yurview.com/arizona/

YurView Arizona (formerly known as Cox 7) is an American cable television channel serving Phoenix, Arizona, United States. The station is owned by Cox Communications. The station's studio facilities are located on the northwest end of Phoenix. The transmission signal is available to Cox cable television subscribers in central and southern Arizona, which includes the Phoenix and Tucson metro areas. It is on channel 4 on Cox's Phoenix-market systems and channel 7 on Cox's systems in southern Arizona.

== History ==
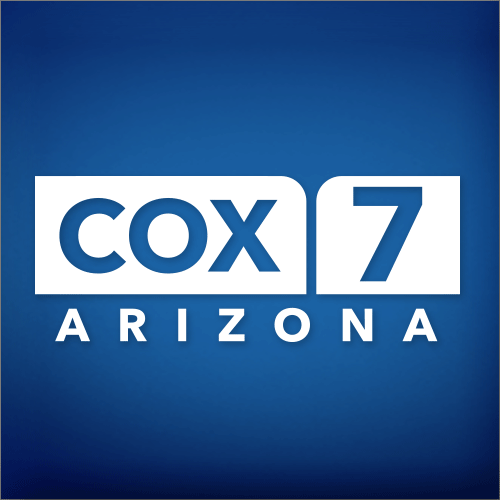
Former logo as "Cox 7," used from 2010 to 2017.

=== Arizona Sports Programming Network ===
What is today YurView Arizona was established on October 1, 1981 as the Arizona Sports Programming Network (ASPN) by American Cable (a division of the Times Mirror Company), one of Cox's predecessors in Phoenix, after it signed a 13-year rights agreement with the Phoenix Suns. The channel also aired Phoenix Inferno soccer and Arizona State Sun Devils athletic events. The next year, it added a slate of high school football games on tape delay; in 1983, it then aired the first live high school football telecast in Arizona since 1964.

ASPN converted from a premium service to basic cable in 1986. The network also added baseball games from the San Diego Padres and San Francisco Giants. By 1993, however, it was not available on all Valley cable systems, prompting smaller providers with 33,000 subscribers to sue Dimension Cable—American's successor—to seek access to its 34 Suns games. In 1994, Cox acquired Times Mirror's cable operation, including Dimension Cable and ASPN.

=== Shift in focus ===
In 1996, Liberty Media acquired the rights to the relocating Phoenix Coyotes NHL team and the 1998 expansion Arizona Diamondbacks baseball franchise for $90 million, launching Fox Sports Arizona with the rights. However, Fox Sports and Cox—which had bought Dimension—were at loggerheads in a carriage dispute that threatened to leave cable viewers on the largest system in town unable to see the Coyotes. Fox Sports Arizona and ASPN, which was renamed Cox Sports at the same time the new regional sports network launched, shared a channel; this meant that satellite viewers who only received Fox Sports Arizona programming did not get Suns games even though they were on one channel on cable.

Cox Sports rebranded as "Cox 9" on November 1, 1998, becoming a full-time channel on channel 9. Retaining the Suns and high school football, Cox 9 became a general-interest channel airing previews of channels only available on Cox's digital service and community programming. The Suns moved to Fox Sports in 2003. A further lineup shuffle in 2004 moved Cox 9 to channel 7 as "Cox 7".

=== Rebranding as YurView ===
In March 2017, Cox Communications rebranded its local origination channels under the YurView banner, as part of a nationwide effort by Cox to bring all of their community access channels under a unified brand. In Phoenix, YurView moved to channel 4, allowing KAZT (channel 7 in Prescott) to use cable channel 7 for the first time.

Production and post-production of most of YurView's original programming is produced at Cox Creative Studios.

== Sports programming ==
=== Arizona Rattlers ===
In 2012, YurView became the official broadcast partner of the Arizona Rattlers. In 2013 the partnership was renewed through the 2015 Arena Football League season. Rattlers games can be seen by Cox cable television subscribers in Central and Southern Arizona. Games are also available online on Cox7.com. The broadcast team includes Dale Hellestrae, Kevin Ray, Chris Harris and Lindsey Smith.

=== Grand Canyon Antelopes ===
In October 2013, Cox Communications and Grand Canyon University (GCU) reached an agreement to form a comprehensive partnership that made Cox7 the exclusive carrier of GCU's inaugural Division I men's basketball season. The broadcast team for the men's basketball games included Barry Buete, Rex Chapman and Matt Rosen.

In addition to men's basketball, YurView coverage of GCU sports showcased many of the other Lopes programs. Additional coverage began with a women's volleyball match against Idaho on Nov. 21, women's basketball vs. Chicago State on Jan. 30, and the baseball home opener against Hofstra on Feb. 21.

Prior to the 2014-15 Grand Canyon Antelopes men's basketball season, an extension of the contract was reached. YurView's coverage of GCU games now extended through the end of the 2015–2016 season, the Lopes' third in Division I.

GCU games moved to KUTP "Fox 10 Xtra" for the 2019–20 season, expanding their distribution beyond cable viewers.

=== Arizona Diamondbacks ===
After Diamond Sports Group, as part of its bankruptcy proceedings, terminated its contract to show Arizona Diamondbacks games on Bally Sports Arizona (the former Fox Sports Arizona), Major League Baseball took control of the team's telecasts and reached its own deals with cable and satellite providers. On Cox's systems in Phoenix and Tucson, Diamondbacks games are carried on YurView.

== Original series ==
=== STEM Journals ===
An Arizona-produced program hosted by Geoff Notkin, who was previously a co-host of Science Channel's Meteorite Men, and focuses on STEM-related material targeted towards middle and high school students. STEM Journals highlights recent developments in science, technology, engineering, and math and exploring STEM-related careers. Episodes showcase professionals in STEM fields and how their professions improve our communities.

=== Step Outside ===
The longest running program currently on YurView, Step Outside is hosted by Arizona landscape architect Pete Curé. The show provides viewers with gardening inspiration through tours of beautiful yards, gardens and landscape projects. Pete Curé also shares his wealth of botanical knowledge in providing tips for plant care and maintenance.

=== Su Vida ===
Su Vida hosted by Vanessa Ramirez and JR Cardenas, celebrates Southwest Hispanic culture, lifestyle, family and food. Su Vida focuses on the Hispanic community of Arizona with culturally impactful stories and information.
