= Glen Wilson =

Glen Wilson may refer to:

- Glen P. Wilson (1923–2005), executive director of the National Space Society
- Glen Wilson (footballer) (1929–2005), English footballer
- Glen Wilson (harpsichordist) (born 1952), American classical harpsichordist
- Glen Wilson (squash player) (born 1971), squash coach and former squash player from New Zealand

== See also ==
- Glenn Wilson (disambiguation)
