= National Space Institute =

Former American space advocacy group

National Space Institute logo which remained unchanged when NSI merged with the L5 Society to become the present-day National Space Society

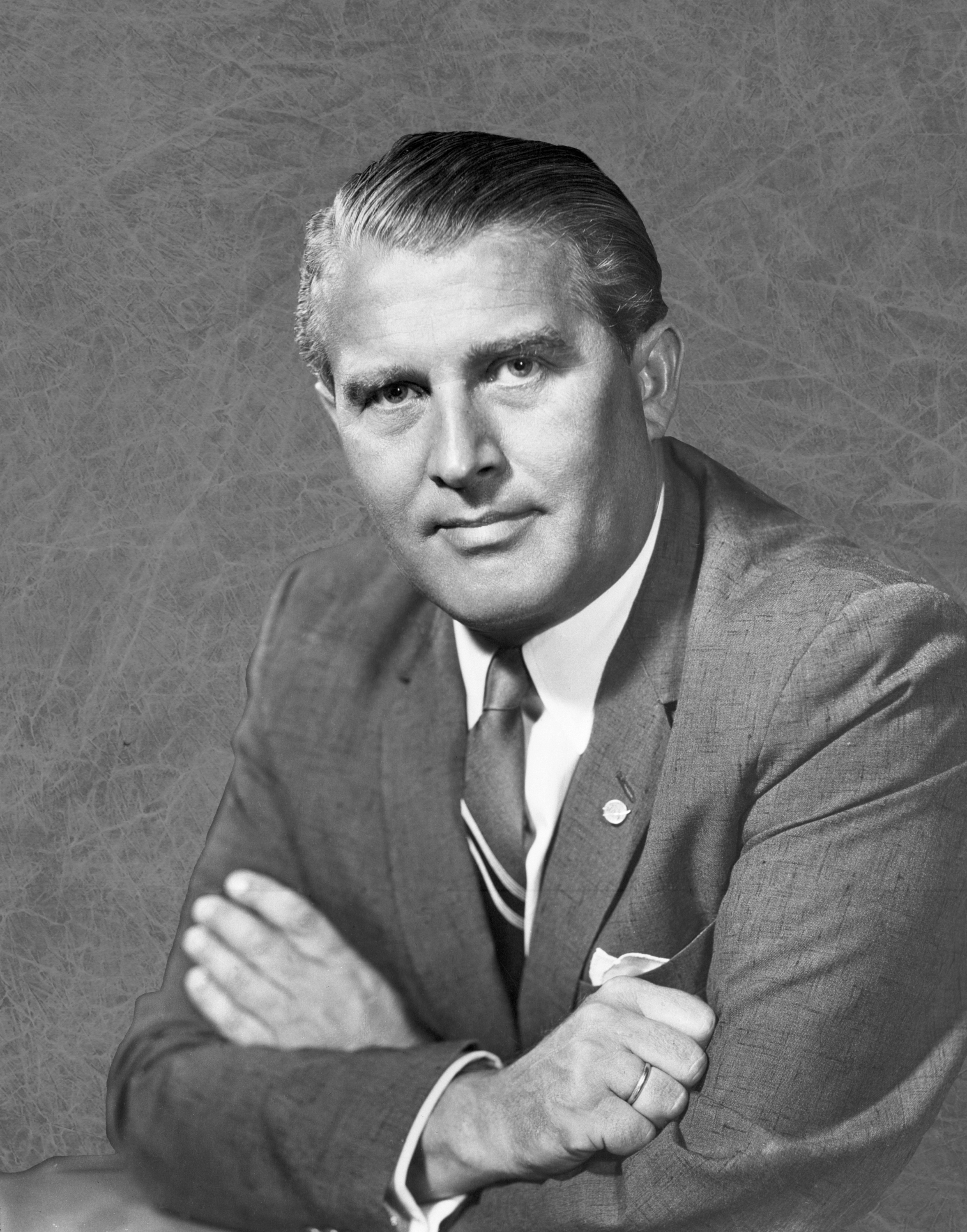
Wernher von Braun (1912-1977), founder of the National Space Institute, forerunner of the present-day National Space Society

The National Space Institute was a space advocacy group, the first of its kind, established by Wernher von Braun to help maintain the public's support for the United States space program. It has since merged, in 1987, with the L5 Society founded by fans of the Space Colonization and Industrialization work of Gerard K. O'Neill, to become the present-day National Space Society.

== Founding ==
In its earliest stages of formation in June 1974, NSI was first known as the "National Space Association", but was renamed from "Association" to "Institute" in April 1975. Von Braun was the NSI's first president, but shortly became chairman, with journalist and former ABC-TV 20/20 host Hugh Downs as president. Charles C. Hewitt was the first executive director.

Downs later recalled the beginning of the organization:

"Long before the launch of Apollo 17, the last [Apollo] Moon mission, Wernher von Braun recognized that something had to be done to keep the importance of ongoing space activity before the public mind. The sort of organization that could do such a job would need to be independent enough to view critically all aspects of NASA policy and implementation."

At the first annual meeting of the organization, in July 1975, von Braun said:

"The main role of the National Space Institute will be that of a catalyst between the space techonologist and the user. It will attempt to bring to the attention of people the new opportunities offered by advances made in space experiments and space techniques. It will study the feasibility of the application, and the potential uses of space technology as it relates to other human activities."

Initial members serving on the NSI board of directors and governors were a veritable "Who's Who" list that included comedian and entertainer Bob Hope, singer/songwriter John Denver, oceanographer Jacques-Yves Cousteau, "Original 7" Project Mercury astronaut and Senator John H. Glenn Jr., Apollo 8 astronaut Frank Borman, Apollo 11 astronauts Buzz Aldrin and Michael Collins, Michael DeBakey, Star Trek creator Gene Roddenberry and actress Nichelle Nichols.

Toward the end of 1975, von Braun commented on the state of the general public's interest in the space program.

"I'm fully aware that public interest is a very fickle thing. One day, the word is 'Moon or bust,' and the next day it is 'let's clean up the rivers.' People get so much information today that the priorities in [their] minds swing back and forth. The Apollo flights to the Moon were demonstrations of immense capabilities and potential, but in some respect they may be compared with Lindbergh's flight across the ocean. I think space is now entering a maturing period where it will be less gee-whiz, less sensational, but it will become more a part of everyday life -- just like the airlines. ... There were great men long before the first big rockets were built. And we are just building on their legacy. We want to make sure that this legacy can now be passed on to the next generation, the people who will really pick the fruits of the trees we have planted. I think the silliest part of the dacay of the public interest in space is that ... we planted the orchard, and we nourished it and fertilized it and watered it and gave it all our tender loving care. And now, the time comes when the fruits can be picked – and they don't want to play the fruit pickers! That is where I think the young generation can make the greatest contribution – pick the fruits."

== Relationship with Omni magazine ==
After some years of publishing a newsletter that became known as INSIght, the Institute entered into an arrangement with the publishers of Omni magazine whereby all members except life members would receive that magazine as part of their membership. Omni editor Ben Bova joined the NSI board, then became vice president and finally succeeded Downs as president. He continued as president after the Omni arrangement was discontinued and an agreement was made with Palmer Publications to make their monthly general space interest magazine Space World the official NSI member magazine.

When von Braun died in June 1977, Hugh Downs became Chairman of the Board and, after a time, Ben Bova assumed the presidency. After Hewitt departed in 1980, Courtney Stadd served for a period as General Manager. The Institute was then led until 1984 by executive director Mark R. Chartrand, followed by Glen P. Wilson.

== Merger ==
Under Bova and Wilson, the arrangements for merger with the L5 Society were concluded, and the name change to National Space Society was announced in advance of the merger, with vague explanations to the members. Since the merger, it has been claimed that the name change took place upon the merger, but the historical record to the contrary is clear. Following the merger, Wilson was succeeded by his assistant, Lori Garver. The merged organization has continued to use the NSS name and logo after a joint membership vote was taken in 1987 to determine whether or not to change it to the "Space Frontier Society."

A more complete history of the National Space Institute is contained in a series of articles published in the November/December 1994 issue of Ad Astra, the magazine of the NSS.

== See also ==
- Space advocacy
