= George Landwehr von Pragenau =

Austrian-American rocket scientist and inventor

- Born: January 5, 1927; Austria
- Died: July 11, 2013 (aged 86); Huntsville, Alabama, U.S.
- Spouse: Helga Stork
- Children: 7
- Awards: NASA Inventor of the Year (1985)
- Scientific career
- Institutions: Army Ballistic Missile Agency, Marshall Space Flight Center

George Landwehr von Pragenau (January 5, 1927 - July 11, 2013) was an Austrian-American engineer and rocket scientist. Brought to the U.S. by the Army for his work with transistors, he was heavily involved with the testing of the Saturn I and Saturn V rockets and the Space Shuttle. In 1985 he received NASA's Inventor of the Year Award for his work in stabilizing the Shuttle's fuel pumps.

== Biography ==
=== Early life ===
Von Pragenau was born January 5, 1927, in Austria. He developed a "bug for flying" at the age of 8, an interest he attributed to watching rich youths from Vienna fly gliders from a hill on the Hungarian border. After Austria was occupied by Germany, von Pragenau joined the Luftwaffe, both from his fascination with flight and from a desire to avoid being sent to the Eastern front. Though he heard rumors of plans to train the Austrian pilots to fly rocket planes, by the end of World War II his experience was only with flying gliders as a trainee pilot.

After the end of the war, von Pragenau studied at a university in Vienna while living in the Russian-controlled zone of Austria, receiving an MS in electronics and electronics communications. In the 1950s, von Pragenau learned to work with the transistors being produced by Philips; his work experience drew the attention of the U.S. Army, which was looking for transistor experts to work on the American rocket program. At the recommendation of one of his professors, von Pragenau submitted his name to the embassy in Vienna; he was investigated by Dr. Heinz-Hermann Koelle and accepted into the program. Given the choice between traveling to Huntsville, Alabama or Dayton, Ohio, von Pragenau chose Huntsville, as he shared a common language with the German team already established there.

=== ABMA career ===
Von Pragenau arrived in the U.S. in 1957 or 1958, where he began work at the Army Ballistic Missile Agency. Though his interest was more in space travel, he was employed in the missile program indirectly under Dr. Walter Haeussermann. Von Pragenau designed circuitry, dealing with frequency standards and high voltage generators, that would replace the vacuum tubes in use at the time.

In 1960 von Pragenau's lab moved to the new Marshall Space Flight Center. Still interested in flight, von Pragenau sought to join Dr. Koelle's team in working on advanced rocket configurations for space flight. Von Pragenau's lab director initially refused to release him but ultimately allowed him to join Koelle's team. By 1969 von Pragenau was employed within the Flight Dynamics branch of the Astrionics Lab.

=== MSFC career ===
At the MSFC, von Pragenau began work on testing the Saturn I rocket. Tests at the time often used scale models built by the Langley Research Center, which von Pragenau believed introduced inaccuracy in results. Full-scale models used in testing were suspended using cables to replicate motion, but the cables resonated in ways that also negatively affected the accuracy of test data. Von Pragenau identified how the existing test systems could not produce reliable stability data and developed a stability calculation to improve them, also identifying elements of the rocket that were insufficiently rigid. For his efforts, he was appointed director of dynamic testing. Von Pragenau considered the issues with Saturn I his "fiercest situation" and called solving them his "first... feather in the hat of a rocketeer."

After his success in the Saturn I program, von Pragenau began work on the Saturn V. To avoid the issues that arose in the previous program from simulating movement with cables, he designed a dynamic launch pad for the rocket to allow the friction-free simulation of free flight motion in all directions. Though he was heavily involved in the design of the Saturn V's testing, he took little part in the actual firing tests of the rocket. After the first Saturn V flight, pogo oscillations were observed in the rocket's liquid oxygen tanks; von Pragenau led a tiger team to solve the oscillations before the launch of the Moon rocket.

Von Pragenau next worked on the Space Shuttle program. He reprised his work with a tiger team to develop a solution to pogo oscillations in the Shuttle's fuel. In 1985 he received the NASA Inventor of the Year Award for successfully stabilizing the Space Shuttle LOX pumps.

In the next several years, von Pragenau filed two patents for new Shuttle stack designs; the first was filed in 1974 and granted in 1975, while the second was filed in 1982 and granted in 1984. Both reoriented the stack more vertically, like a rocket, with the Solid Rocket Boosters placed together at the bottom and the LOX tanks oriented lower to improve stability. The second patent held the SRBs together with a connecting thrust structure and in place with slide rails on either side; the whole structure could be jettisoned using pyrotechnic bolts once the SRBs were empty. Neither design was ultimately adopted by NASA.

After the Challenger disaster, von Pragenau again proposed an updated design for the Space Shuttle. He also conceived a solid twist seal to replace the Shuttle's rubber seals, a design which he offered to Thiokol; the company chose to retain its rubber seals, instead using a "double clutch" system to prevent hot gasses from reaching them. After NASA forbade von Pragenau from presenting his designs to the American Institute of Aeronautics and Astronautics, he became frustrated and left, retiring from the MSFC in April 1991.

Von Pragenau continued to work in the private sector after leaving NASA. In 1995 he founded a one-man company called Provident Technology. Provident received two contracts with NASA for testing, using damping seals von Pragenau had proposed during his time at the MSFC.

=== Personal life ===
In early 1961, von Pragenau was introduced by a Mrs. Schlidt to Helga Stork, a recent arrival from Germany who worked in the Schlidts' house. The two spent the summer together alongside a number of von Pragenau's NASA colleagues. On New Year's Eve 1961, von Pragenau proposed to Stork; the couple married in March of the following year.
