= STEM Journals =

2013 American educational TV series

- Genre: Educational
- Presented by: Brad Piccirillo, Geoffrey Notkin
- Country of origin: United States
- Original language: English
- No. of seasons: 3
- No. of episodes: 21

Production
- Executive producers: JC Collins, Leslie Woodruff, Gretchen Burnett, Geoffrey Notkin, David Routt
- Producers: Frank Kraljic, David Routt
- Production location: American Southwest
- Running time: 25-30 minutes

Original release
- Network: Cox7
- Release: February 5, 2013 – October 5, 2014

STEM Journals is an American educational television program. It was broadcast in 2013–2014 and was hosted by Brad Piccirillo and Geoffrey Notkin. The show dealt with topics in the fields of science, technology, education and mathematics ("STEM"), and introduced scientists, institutions and projects in those fields, such as OSIRIS-REx and the Catalina Sky Survey.

In 2013, "Forces of Flight" won a Rocky Mountain Emmy in the Teen Program/Special category. In 2014, "Action Sports" and "Forensics" won a Rocky Mountain Emmy Award in the Educational-Program Special category.

"Forensics," written and directed by David Routt, won a Silver Telly Award. "Action Sports," written and directed by Frank Kraljic, won a Bronze Telly Award. STEM Journals is an American educational science television program hosted by Brad Piccirillo and Geoffrey Notkin for children interested in science, technology, engineering, and math (STEM). The program aired on Cox7 for three seasons and won two Telly Awards.

== Season 1 ==
No.	Title	Original release date
1	"Arachnids"	February 5, 2013
Brad explores the creepy-crawly world of scorpions, spiders, mites, ticks, and other multi-legged insects.
2	"Volcanology"	February 12, 2013
Brad joins three volcanologists in Northern Arizona, where over 600 volcanoes making up the San Francisco Volcanic Field are located, to explore the impressive forces which have helped shape the Earth.
3	"Cognition"	February 19, 2013
Brad joins cognitive scientists at the Arizona State University campus and at Brain State Technologies corporate campus to study how magic, sports, and brain trauma help shape our understanding of the human brain.
4	"Rocks"	February 26, 2013
Brad joins geologists to examine rocks: the building blocks of Earth.
5	"Diseases"	April 2, 2013
Brad joins Veterinary Disease Specialists and Outbreak Epidemiologists in search of infectious diseases in fox and prairie dog populations, coming face-to-face with the Black Death in Arizona.
6	"Nutrition"	April 14, 2013
Brad explores the basics of nutrition - how farmers' markets can help people find enough fruits and vegetables to balance their diets, while supporting organic growers; the importance of whole grains and sustainable seafood sources; plus, he gets an unexpected surprise at a dairy farm.
7	"4 Forces of Flight"	April 28, 2013
Brad learns about The 4 Forces of Flight - Lift, Thrust, Drag and Gravity - that all flying things must obey. He explores jobs such as rocket scientist, flight test engineer and gets a lesson in drag while sitting on a bicycle in a wind tunnel.

== Season 2 ==
No.	Title	Original release date
1	"Archeologists"	October 11, 2013
Archaeology is the study of human history and prehistory. By studying our past, we are able to create a more sustainable future! Join Geoff as he goes on an archaeological dig to learn more about the human history of Arizona. Geoff Notkin ventures to Mesa Grande to dig up some interesting facts about the history of the Hohokam and then takes his findings to the AZ Museum of Natural History to analyze the artifacts.
2	"Light"	October 20, 2013
Geoff visits the University of Arizona, Northern Arizona University, and the Catalina Sky Survey to explore alien life on faraway planets to near-Earth asteroid defense initiatives.
3	"Astronomers"	October 27, 2013
Geoff visits the University of Arizona, Northern Arizona University, and the Catalina Sky Survey to explore alien life on faraway planets to near-Earth asteroid defense initiatives.
4	"Biomechanics"	November 3, 2013
Geoff explores the mechanics that allow our bodies to kick a soccer ball or whip up some eggs, and how we devise the technology that enables to study those movements.
5	"Water"	November 13, 2013
Geoff travels throughout Arizona to learn more about H2O and explore some the interesting research being done with water.
6	"Forensics"	December 1, 2013
Geoff Notkin gets a lesson in deadly diseases, takes a shot at ballistics analysis, and goes on a CSI adventure to learn more about forensics!
7	"Civil Engineering"	April 28, 2013
Brad learns about The 4 Forces of Flight - Lift, Thrust, Drag and Gravity - that all flying things must obey. He explores jobs such as rocket scientist, flight test engineer and gets a lesson in drag while sitting on a bicycle in a wind tunnel.

== Season 3 ==
No.	Title	Original release date
1	"Action sports"	April 13, 2013
Entrepreneurs and engineers come together to create innovative designs for outdoor activities and sports.
2	"Nanotechnology"	October 20, 2013
Geoff explores the word of microscopic technological advances, and how this nanotechnology is leading to huge developments in energy, medicine, materials, and more.
3	"Social Insects"	April 27, 2014
Geoff explores the world of social insects: bees, ants, wasps, and termites. Geoff visits the Arizona State University bee labs to learn more about these insects' amazing cooperative lives before joining a University of Arizona entomologist to locate termites in the desert.
4	"Atmospheric Sciences"	November 3, 2013
Geoff joins students to learn about atmospheric sciences before traveling to Winslow, Arizona to Meteor Crater with a team of atmospheric sciences researchers to study weather in and around the crater, and how that informs what we know about our own planet's atmosphere.
5	"OSIRIS-REx"	September 14, 2014
Two years from mission launch for OSIRIS-REx, Geoff meets with engineers in Tucson, Arizona associated with University of Arizona, the University of Denver, and Colorado's Lockheed Martin Space Systems to discuss taking the first steps to building the spacecraft.
6	"Paleontology"	September 28, 2014
Geoff unearths fossils dating from 50 and 150 million years ago in the heart of Wyoming's dinosaur fossil country. International paleontologists work together to excavate a suspected fossilized Diplodocus dinosaur. Meanwhile a researcher at Arizona State University studies stromatolites, the most ancient record of life on Earth, as a potential analogue for prehistoric Martian life.
7	"Young Innovators"	October 5, 2014
What is the next "Big Idea" and who will develop it? Geoff meets bright, young innovators trying to solve puzzles that will advance science and technology as well as mentors from Arizona State University's SCENE program, who encourage their students to become professional scientists and shape their research to exhibit at the Intel International Science and Engineering Fair. Outside the classroom, makerspaces and hackerspaces like TechShop are the playground for today's makers, who will become tomorrow's difference makers.

Guests:

- Dr.Sian Proctor - explorer, scientist, and STEM communicator. Dr. Sian Proctor was a finalist for the 2009 NASA Astronaut Program. She teaches geology, sustainability, and planetary science at South Mountain Community College.
- Prof. Susanne Neuer - oceanographer and associate professor at Arizona State University.
- Dr. Dante Lauretta - Professor of planetary science and cosmochemistry at the University of Arizona's Lunar and Planetary Laboratory and currently serving as Principal Investigator on NASA's OSIRIS-REx mission
- Dr. Stephen Pratt - is an associate professor at the ASU School of Life Sciences and
- ASU doctoral candidate Job Bobek,
