= Chris Pancratz =

Christopher Michael Pancratz (October 31, 1950 – August 2, 2003) was the Chairman of the Executive Committee of the National Space Society. He died August 2, 2003, of cancer.

Pancratz also operated a health care industry consulting business in the Northern Virginia area called PAN Development Associates (PANDA), from the late 1990s until shortly before his death, in which he was CEO and principal consultant.

Pancratz was active in community service, and served on the board of trustees of the Jaycees.

"The loss of Chris Pancratz robs the NSS of a valuable resource-and individual who combined the qualities of understanding and enthusiastically supporting the exploration of space, plus personal energy and organizational drive." – Hugh Downs, Chairman of the NSS Board of Governors
