= Glen P. Wilson =

Glen Parten Wilson Jr. (1923–2005) worked on the Senate space and astronautics committee, the National Aeronautics and Space Administration (NASA) and was executive director emeritus of the National Space Society, a space advocacy group.

Born in Waco, Texas and raised in Houston, he was an aviation electronics technician in the Navy during World War II and also worked for Lockheed Aircraft Co. in Burbank, Calif.

He was an aeronautical engineering graduate of the University of Texas at Austin, where he also received his master's degree and doctorate in psychology.

Wilson was working in his native Texas when he was summoned in 1955 with his wife to join the Washington office of then-Sen. Lyndon B. Johnson (D-TX), the majority leader. Wilson was a staff assistant, and his wife was a secretary, and they shared mutual friends with Johnson.

A Johnson protégé, Wilson soon joined the staff of the Senate's Special Committee on Space and Astronautics. His function initially was to interview specialists and analyze technical data so the committee had guidelines as it wrote the National Aeronautics and Space Act of 1958 and created the National Aeronautics and Space Administration.

He later was involved in research and development, technology assessment and policy planning. He remained with the committee until its termination in 1977 as part of a Senate reorganization.

The next year, NASA hired him to develop the Shuttle Student Involvement Program to spur student interest through suggestions on possible experiments to conduct aboard the shuttle. Before retiring in 1982, he received NASA's Exceptional Service Medal.

From 1984 to 1988, Wilson was executive director of what is now the National Space Society, a nonprofit organization that promotes space-related activities. He oversaw his group's merger with the like-minded L5 Society. He continued to serve on the board until his death January 8, 2005 at a hospice in Fort Worth, TX.
