= LLV =

LLV may refer to:

- Grumman LLV (Long Life Vehicle), an American light transport truck model
- Lockheed Launch Vehicle, former name for Athena (rocket family)
- Lüliang Airport (IATA airport code LLV), Lüliang in Shanxi Province, China
- Llandovery railway station (station code LLV), Llandovery, Carmarthenshire, Wales, UK
- General Motors LLV (Vortec 2900), a motor engine
- Luxor Las Vegas, a hotel and casino on the Las Vegas Strip in Paradise, Nevada
- LLv, squadron designator for the Finnish Air Force

== See also ==
- LV (disambiguation)
- LL5, a type of LL chondrite
- L55 (disambiguation)
