= Meteorite Men =

- Meteorite hunters Steve Arnold and Geoff Notkin
- Genre: Documentary; Reality
- Presented by: Steve Arnold; Geoffrey Notkin
- Country of origin: United States
- Original language: English
- No. of seasons: 3
- No. of episodes: 23 (including pilot)

Production
- Executive producer: Eric Schotz
- Producers: Sonya Gay Bourn; Ruth Rivin; Kathy Williamson; Bob Melisso; James Rowley
- Production locations: American Southwest; American Midwest; Texas; Canada; Chile; Sweden; Australia
- Camera setup: Randall Love; German Abarca; Tim Murphy; Dave Marlin
- Running time: 45–48 minutes

Original release
- Network: Science Channel
- Release: May 10, 2009 – January 23, 2012

Meteorite Men is a documentary reality television series featuring meteorite hunters Geoff Notkin and Steve Arnold. The pilot episode premiered on May 10, 2009. The full first season began on January 20, 2010, on the Science Channel. The second season premiered November 2, 2010, and the third season began November 28, 2011. Professors and scientists at prominent universities including UCLA, ASU, UA, Edmonton, and other institutions, including NASA's Johnson Space Center, are featured.

== Summary ==
The show follows two meteorite hunters, Steve Arnold and Geoffrey Notkin, as they travel around the world scouring the Earth's surface for meteorites.

Arnold's background lies primarily in business, while Notkin is a passionate collector and science writer. In the pilot episode of Meteorite Men, Notkin and Arnold travel to the farmlands of Brenham, Kansas, where Arnold located and recovered the largest oriented pallasite ever found.

Meteorite Men has won two bronze Telly Awards. The show has also spawned a modern-day "gold rush" as thousands of amateur meteorite hunters now scour the globe each year in search of meteorites.

Some of the specimens found on the show were sold to collectors, while others were donated to university collections.

== Notable finds ==
=== Brenham - the World's Largest Oriented Pallasite ===
The Meteorite Men pilot was filmed at a strewn field in Brenham, Kansas at the same location where in October 2005, Arnold and geologist Philip Mani had located and recovered a 650 kg mass of Brenham, which became known as largest oriented pallasite ever found. To find the meteorite, Arnold used a metal detector he created himself and a unique mapping technique.

=== Morasko, Poland ===
In 2011, Arnold and Notkin found two irons, weighing approximately 544 grams (0.544 kg) and 34 kilograms (34,000 g), at 30 centimetres (0.98 ft) and 156 centimetres (5.12 ft) deep, respectively, while filming Episode 1 of Season 3 of Meteorite Men in the Morasko Meteorite Nature Reserve in Poland. The discovery of these specimens below the depth of previously recorded finds suggested that further, more detailed surveys should be conducted with improved metal detecting equipment. Furthermore, the larger specimen was found embedded in a Miocene clay, which proves that it fell at that exact spot and was not transported by glaciers, disproving an earlier theory.

== Episodes ==
=== Season 1 (2010) ===
No.	Title	Original release date
1	"The Buzzard Coulee Fireball and Whitecourt Crater, Canada"	January 20, 2010
The Meteorite Men visit Alberta, Canada in search of meteorites around Whitecourt Crater after the Buzzard Coulee Fireball.
2	"Odessa Meteorite Crater, Texas"	January 27, 2010
The Meteorite Men search for pieces of a 63,000-year-old impact near Odessa, Texas, with new detectors.
3	"Tucson Ring Mystery, Southern Arizona"	February 3, 2010
The Meteorite Men hunt for pieces of the elusive Tucson Ring in Southern Arizona.
4	"The Gold Basin, Arizona"	February 10, 2010
The Meteorite Men follow the work of Professor Jim Kriegh into a strewn field in Arizona inside National Park boundaries. After the hunt, Geoff and Steve take their samples Dr. Laurence Garvie at Arizona State University for further study.
5	"The Dry Lake Bed, Nevada"	February 17, 2010
The Meteorite Men hunt around dry lake beds in the Great Basin of Nevada.
6	"Ash Creek Fall, Texas"	February 14, 2010
On February 15th, 2009 at around 11AM local time, a small asteroid entered the atmosphere and broke up over West, Texas.

=== Season 2 (2010) ===
No.	Title	Original release date
1	"Alpha Site, Kansas"	November 2, 2010
The Meteorite Men return to their top-secret location in eastern Kansas where a rare pallasite meteorite contains extraordinary gem-quality olivine crystals.
2	"Imilac, Chile"	November 9, 2010
The Meteorite Men return to the Imilac strewn field in Chile's Atacama Desert, where they first hunted together some 13 years ago, and the Vaca Muerta ("dead cow") strewn field near the small town of Taltal where the rarest of meteorites, the mesosiderite, can be found.
3	"Monturaqui, Chile"	November 16, 2010
This 1,509-foot-diameter (460-meter-diameter) crater is one of the best-preserved meteorite craters on the planet. Measuring 34 meters (112 feet) deep, the Monturaqui crater is often compared with the Bonneville crater on Mars. In the vast and arid Atacama Desert, San Juan is a newly discovered meteorite gold mine, where numerous different meteorites have been recovered, including the coveted carbonaceous chondrite.
4	"Dugway, Utah"	November 23, 2010
On Nov 18, 2009, a fireball streaked across the midnight sky over western Utah. Using NEXRAD Doppler weather radar images and eyewitness testimony, the Meteorite Men track the strewn field down to Dugway Military Base. Military officials grant Geoff and Steve exclusive access to the base's dangerous ammunitions-testing grounds to search for remnants of the majestic fireball.
5	"Mifflin, Wisconsin"	November 30, 2010
On April 14, 2010, a fireball lit up the night sky. The sonic boom was heard for miles. As it was perhaps the most publicized meteorite fall in history, swarms of meteorite hunters flooded the scene in hopes of securing a piece of this famed fireball.
6	"Muonionalusta, Sweden"	December 7, 2010
With a terrestrial age estimated at more than 800,000 years old, the Muonionalusta meteorites have endured thousands of years' worth of glaciations and melting periods. As a result, thawing ice sheets have migrated the meteorites miles from their original impact site, making Muonionalusta among the largest and most challenging strewn fields on the planet.
7	"Henbury, Australia"	December 14, 2010
The Henbury meteorite strewn field consists of 12 craters that stretch across central Australia's outback. This engraved record of an ancient meteorite shower 4,700 years ago served as the inspiration for Aboriginal folklore and a shadow of dark superstition.
8	"Mundrabilla, Australia"	December 21, 2010
Located in the desolate and dangerous Nullarbor Plain, the Mundrabilla iron meteorites are known for their zoomorphic shapes. Roughly 700,000 years ago, the massive meteoroid showered along a strewn field more than 80 kilometers (50 mi) long. The largest masses, which tipped the scales at 16 tons and 6 tons, were recovered in 1966.

=== Season 3 (2011–12) ===
No.	Title	Original release date
1	"Morasko, Poland"	November 28, 2011
Poland was hit with a meteorite 5,000 years ago which resulted in a scarred landscape and seven craters. Geoff and Steve receive exclusive access to investigate the Morasko crater field for the first time.
2	"Return to Sweden"	December 5, 2011
Geoff and Steve venture north of the Arctic Circle on a quest for ancient buried space rocks near the site of the Muonionalusta site they visited in 2010.
3	"Return to Whitecourt"	December 12, 2011
The hosts return to Canada to retrieve materials from the Whitecourt crater before poachers can compromise the site.
4	"Dronino"	December 19, 2011
Geoff and Steve make the journey to Russia in search of one of the most rare and valuable meteorites on the planet-the Dronino ataxite.
5	"Mojave"	December 26, 2011
Geoff and Steve for meteorites at two locations in the Mojave Desert.
6	"Sahuarita"	January 9, 2012
The guys go to Arizona in search of an unclassified meteorite.
7	"Homestead"	January 16, 2012
Steve and Geoff explore the strewnfield in Homestead, Iowa, where numerous large meteorites fell in 1875.
8	"Pultusk"	January 23, 2012
In the season finale Geoff and Steve return to Poland where, along with their friend Marcin, they investigate the Pultusk meteorite fall from 1868.

== Cultural impact ==
Meteorite Men has been cited as a possible reason behind the spike in interest regarding meteorites and meteorite hunting in the early 2010s. Dr. Laurence Garvie of the Center for Meteorite Studies at Arizona State University has stated that after his appearance on the show, he and his colleagues received about a half-dozen boxes of rocks each week from viewers who believed they had found a meteorite.

=== The Sterley pallasite ===
In approximately 1950, a farmer came across a 1,724.8 gram mass while plowing a field. The specimen, which displayed regmaglypts and fusion crust, was not fully classified until 2012, when the son of the finder, after watching Meteorite Men, took the specimen to Dr. Laurence Garvie at the Center for Meteorite Studies, ASU, for further analysis. The entire mass was then acquired by Ruben Garcia of Mr. Meteorite and Geoffrey Notkin of Aerolite Meteorites and Meteorite Men.

=== Steve Curry incident ===
In 2012, Detective Ryan Piotrowski of the Grand Junction Police Department charged Steve Curry with misdemeanor theft and fraud for selling false meteorites. Piotrowski had seen Meteorite Men and became intrigued by the case when it landed on his sergeant's desk.
