= 5L =

5L or 5-L can refer to:

== Transportation ==
- AeroSur (IATA code)
- 5L, a model of Toyota L engine
- Curtiss F-5L, see Felixstowe F5L
- SSH 5L (WA), former name of U.S. Route 12 in Washington
- Atlantic coast F-5L, see Felixstowe F.5
- Auster J/5L, a model of Auster Aiglet Trainer
- British Rail Class 202 Diesel-electric multiple units (6L) when reduced to a five-carriage configuration
- British Rail Class 203 Diesel-electric multiple units (6B) when reduced to a five-carriage configuration by the removal of their buffet cars

== Science and technology ==
- ORC5L
- TAF5L
- 5L, a model of HP LaserJet 5
- AIX 5L, see IBM AIX

== Other uses ==
- The Horns of Nimon (production code: 5L), a 1979–80 Doctor Who serial

== See also ==
- L5 (disambiguation)
