= Heinz-Hermann Koelle =

German aeronautical engineer (1925–2011)

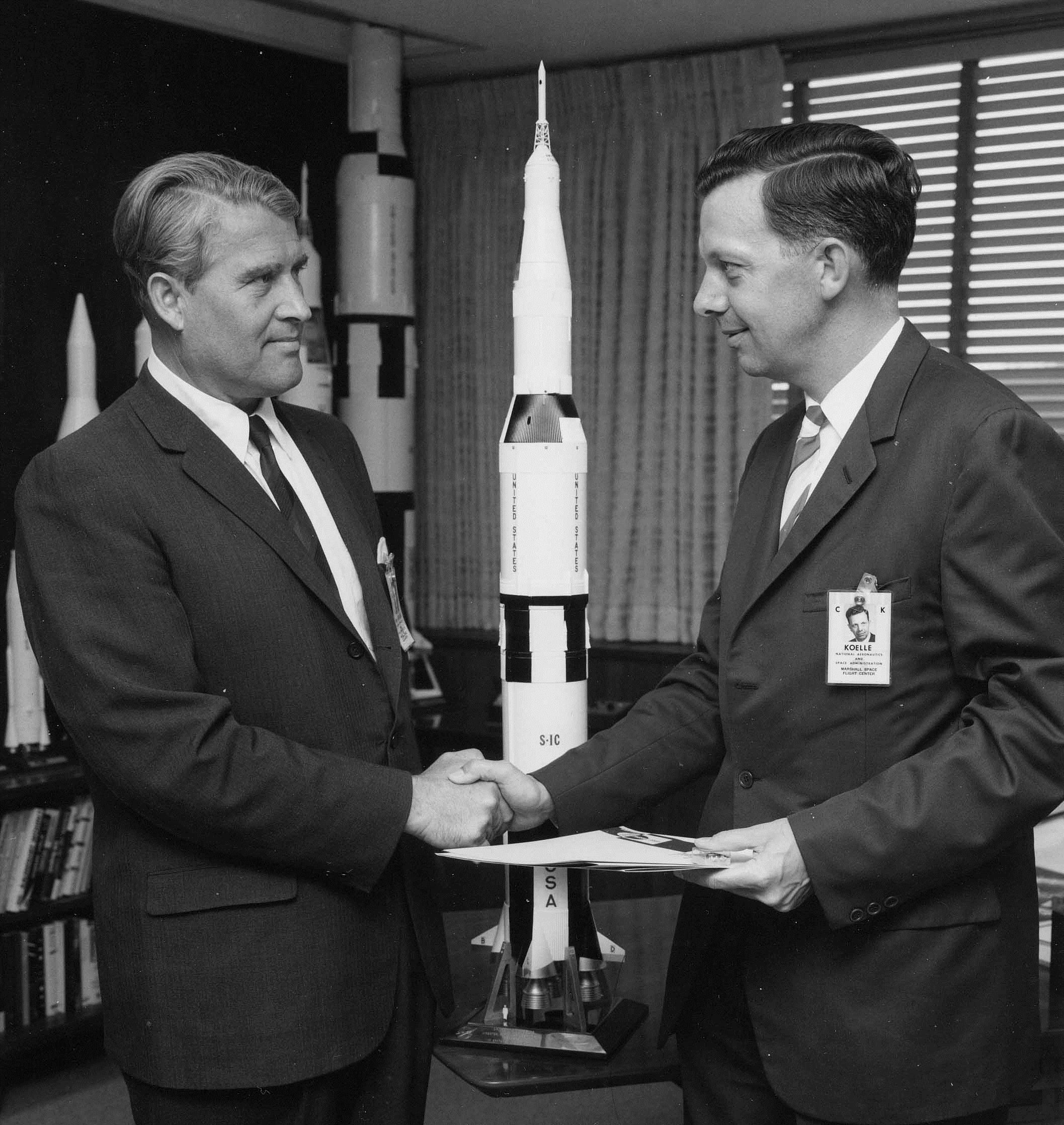
Wernher von Braun (left) and Hermann Koelle

Heinz-Hermann Koelle (22 July 1925, in Danzig, Free City of Danzig – 20 February 2011, in Berlin, Germany) was a German aeronautical engineer who made the preliminary designs on the rocket that would emerge as the Saturn I. Closely associated with Wernher von Braun's team at the Army Ballistic Missile Agency (ABMA), he was a member of the launch crew on Explorer 1 and later directed the Marshall Space Flight Center's involvement in Project Apollo. In 1965, he accepted the Chair of Space Technology at Technische Universität Berlin.

== Early life ==
Koelle was born in 1925 in the Free City of Danzig, son of a lieutenant-colonel in the police. After Germany annexed Danzig in 1939, Koelle joined the Luftwaffe and served as a pilot during the war. During his time in a prisoner of war camp after the war, Koelle turned his back on military matters and turned to the field of civilian spaceflight.

In 1948 he re-formed the pre-war German Society for Space Travel, which brought him into contact with von Braun and many others of the former Peenemünde team. In 1951 he and another ex-pilot helped von Braun publish his book Mars Project in Germany, arranging a publisher to take it on.

He started studying mechanical engineering at the University of Stuttgart, and led the Astronautical Research Institute between 1952 and 1954, when he received his Dipl.-Ing. On his graduation, von Braun invited him to join the ABMA team at the Redstone Arsenal in Huntsville, Alabama.

== ABMA and MSFC ==
Koelle arrived in the U.S. in April 1955, three months before President Dwight D. Eisenhower announced that country's intent to launch a satellite during the International Geophysical Year in 1957. He took charge of Preliminary Design Section of the Structures and Mechanics Laboratory. The section had the task of carrying out "blue-sky" studies into conversions and modifications of various missiles for use as space launchers. Over time the section grew from 4 to 70 people as their studies on what was then known as "Super-Jupiter" evolved into the "Juno V" and finally into the Saturn I. Koelle's last job for the Army involved a feasibility study for a lunar base under Project Horizon.

When ABMA became part of NASA in 1960, the Redstone Arsenal became the Marshall Space Flight Center (MSFC) and the Preliminary Design Section became the Future Projects Office. The Office served to coordinate between MSFC and NASA as a whole, as well as continuing to study new missions based on the Saturn rockets. In 1960 Koelle became a naturalized American citizen. He took his doctorate in Engineering at Technische Universität Berlin in 1963.

== Chair of Space Technology ==
As Koelle watched the conduct of the Vietnam War force reduction in NASA budgets, he concluded that the rapid progress he had participated in was no longer possible, and decided to look for other work. In 1965 he accepted a teaching position at TU Berlin. Following the death of Eugen Sänger (1964), the University offered him the Chair of Space Technology in 1965, a position he held for 30 years.

He received the 1952 Medal of the French Aeroclub and the 1963 Hermann Oberth Gold Medal.

In 2007 he received the Space Pioneer Awards of the National Space Society.

== Family ==
He married Elisabeth Trautmann in 1951; they had three daughters, Ingrid, Karin and Patricia.

== Works ==
- Handbook of astronautical engineering, Editor Heinz Hermann Koelle, McGraw-Hill, 1961
- Prospects of a settlement on the moon: development, operation, cost, benefits, Institut für Luft und Raumfahrt (Berlin), 2002
