= Glenn Wilson =

Glenn Wilson may refer to:

- Glenn Wilson (psychologist) (born 1942), specialist in personality
- Glenn Wilson (baseball) (born 1958), former Major League Baseball outfielder
- Glenn Wilson (tennis) (born 1967), New Zealand professional tennis player
- Glenn Wilson (footballer) (born 1986), former professional football defender. Not to be confused with Glen Wilson (British footballer) (1929–2005)
- Glenn Wilson (murder victim), a man murdered in 2008 and identified in 2015
- Glenn Wilson (rugby) (born Scotland, circa 1949) founder and former captain of the Israel rugby union team 1972-1978
- Glenn Wilson, candidate in the United States House of Representatives elections in Michigan, 2010 and owner of an Internet service provider company

== See also ==
- Glen Wilson (disambiguation)
