= NSS Space Settlement Contest =

International annual design competition

- Current season, competition or edition: 2026 NSS Space Settlement Contest
- Formerly: NASA Space Settlement Contest
- Sport: Design competition
- Founded: Al Globus; Tugrul Sezen
- First season: 1994
- Organizing body: National Space Society
- Motto: "Per Aspera Ad Astra"
- No. of teams: 4,920 teams (2026)
- Countries: 26 countries and regions: United States; Canada; India; China; Brazil; Colombia; Peru; Panama; Ireland; Iceland; United Kingdom; France; Belgium; Spain; Poland; Romania; Bulgaria; Morocco; Turkey; Syria; Iran; United Arab Emirates; South Korea; Taiwan; Bangladesh; Pakistan; Kazakhstan; Indonesia; Thailand
- Most recent champion: Canada (2026)

The NSS Gerard K. O'Neill Space Settlement Contest (formerly the NASA Ames Space Settlement Contest) is an annual design competition by the National Space Society for middle and high school students across the world. Held annually, students use physics, biological, and geological concepts to develop space settlement designs. These designs are composed in research papers and submitted for judging in February, with results usually announced the following month in March. Contenders can compete in three categories: as individuals, as part of a "small group" of up to six students, or as part of a "large group" of up to twelve students.

The contest, renamed in the honor of American physicist Gerard K. O'Neill in 2023, is one of the most prestigious international aerospace competitions in the world, garnering over 4,900 submissions – totaling over 23,000 students – in 2026. Teams are judged and awarded with First, Second, and Third Place Prizes separately based on their grade and team size; small group projects are graded separately than large group projects, while sophomore teams are graded separately than senior teams. One team each year, regardless of grade or team size, is awarded the "Grand Prize" and crowned that year's champion. The contest's 32nd year ran in 2026, with Canada's Central Peel crowned champions.

== History ==
The contest originates from physicist O'Neill's work on space exploration and was co-founded by NASA Ames Research Center scientist Al Globus and public school teacher Tugrul Sezen in 1994. The inaugural contest received 23 submissions from 60 students, with submissions and student numbers increasing in the following years to 601 students in 2007. In 2007, NASA Ames and the National Space Society (NSS) signed a Space Act Agreement to further the contest's growth.

By 2018, the contest, now operated in conjunction with San Jose State University and the NSS, had expanded internationally and received some 2,500 submissions from over 10,000 students. During this time period, the annual budget for the competition was roughly $1 dollar per student, with Globus remarking that the contest was designed to be "effective and extremely low cost". In 2019, contest sponsorship was fully transferred to the NSS and renamed in 2023 to the NSS Gerard K. O'Neill Space Settlement Contest, in honor of O'Neill.

== Competition ==
Registration opens on December 1 every year and typically ends sometime in mid-February the following year. There is a $15 registration fee, but this can be waived in cases of financial hardship.

=== Components ===
The contest focuses on creativity, design, and teamwork. Submissions must relate to a free-floating space settlement, and cannot be attached to a planet or moon, although mining activities may occur on such celestial bodies. Submissions also cannot include any AI-generated work, which includes images and research. Students may submit work including:

- Designs
- Original research
- Essays
- Stories
- Models (e.g. through Tinkercad or SolidWorks)
- Artwork

=== Awards and prizes ===
At the end of the season, the top three teams are invited to give individual lectures at the annual International Space Development Conference (ISDC) in June.

- Grand Prize (Champion): If the team attends the ISDC, they receive the $5,000 Herman Rubin Memorial Scholarship.
- Artistic Merit: $500 scholarship
- Literary Merit: $500 scholarship

== Champions ==
| Year | Champion |
|---|---|
| 1994 | United States |
| 1995 | United States |
| 1996 | Argentina |
| 1997 | United States |
| 1998 | United States |
| 1999 | United States |
| 2000 | Ireland |
| 2001 | United States and Austria (tie) |
| 2002 | United States |
| 2003 | Romania |
| 2004 | Romania |
| 2005 | Romania and India (tie) |
| 2006 | United States and Belgium (tie) |
| 2007 | Romania, Uruguay, and Turkey (tie) |
| 2008 | Romania |
| 2009 | India and Canada (tie) |
| 2010 | United States |
| 2011 | India |
| 2012 | United States and Romania |
| 2013 | United States |
| 2014 | India and Bulgaria |
| 2015 | United States |
| 2016 | South Korea |
| 2017 | India |
| 2018 | Romania |
| 2019 | United States |
| 2020 | United States |
| 2021 | United States |
| 2022 | Ireland |
| 2023 | United States |
| 2024 | India |
| 2025 | Romania |
| 2026 | Canada |
| 2027 | TBD |
