= Morasko Meteorite Nature Reserve =

Impact crater reserve in Poland

Morasko craters
- Location within Europe
- Location: Poland; 52°29′24″N 16°53′47″E

Impact crater structure
- Confidence: Confirmed
- Diameter: 100 m (330 ft)
- Depth: 11 m (36 ft)
- Impactor diameter: 115
- Age: 5 Ka

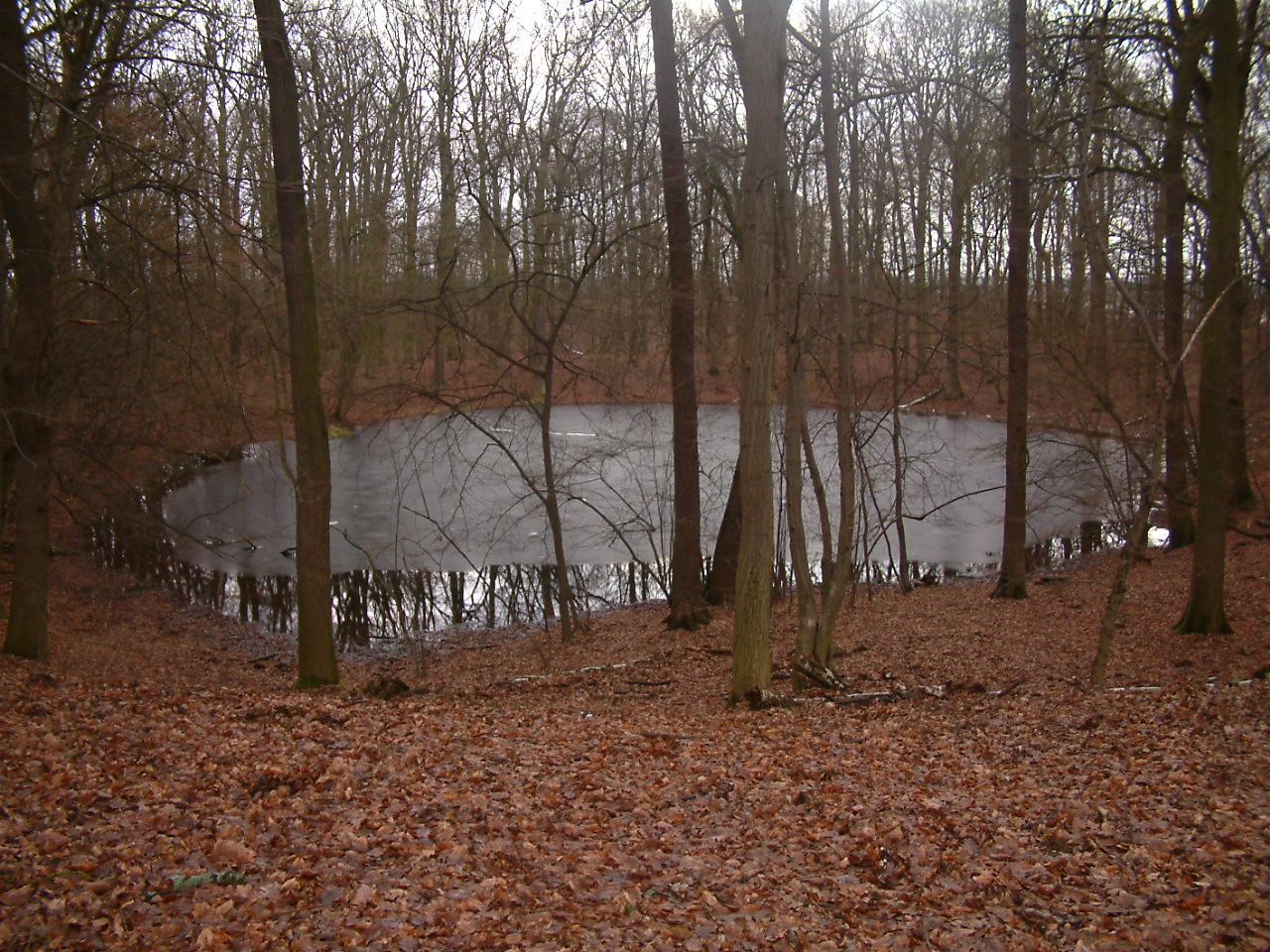
One of the craters in winter

The Morasko meteorite nature reserve (Polish: Rezerwat przyrody meteoryt Morasko) is located in Morasko, on the northern edge of the city of Poznań, Poland. It contains seven meteor craters. The reserve has an area of 55 hectares (136 acres) and was established in 1976.

== Natural environment ==
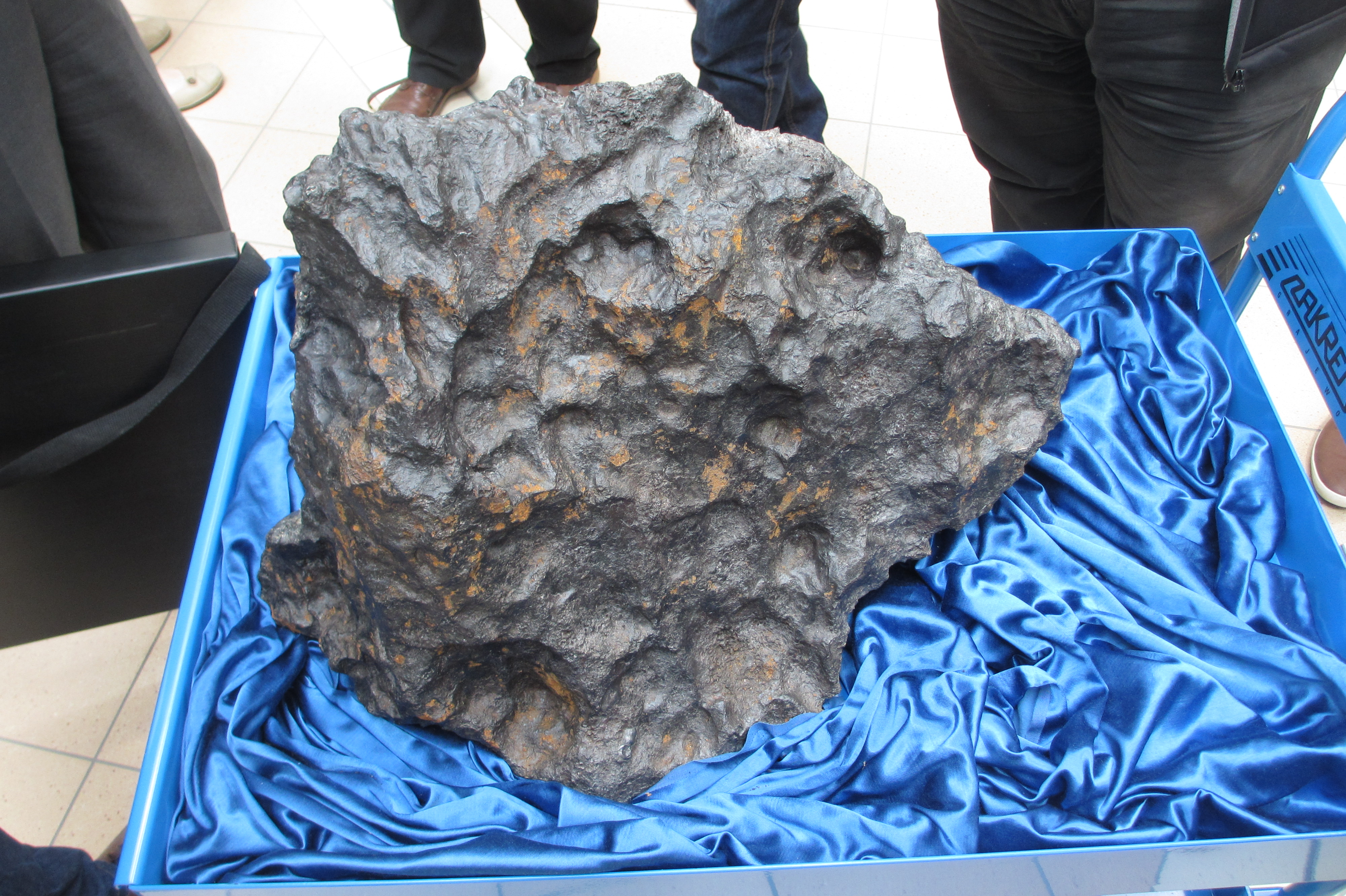
261.8 kilograms (577 lb 3 oz) heavy fragment of a meteorite at Morasko

The land of the reserve is covered by a forest of oak and hornbeam trees, among which grow a number of uncommon plant species, including

- Martagon or Turk's cap lily (Lilium martagon)
- Wild ginger (Asarum europaeum)
- Tropical hornwort (Ceratophyllum submersum)

Some uncommon birds can also be found here, including

- The European nightjar (Caprimulgus europaeus)
- The black woodpecker (Dryocopus martius)

== Impact craters ==
The largest of the seven craters on the reserve has a diameter of about 100 metres (330 feet), and is about 11 metres (36 feet) deep. Five of the craters, including the largest, contain lakes. The date of formation is estimated to be about 5,000 years ago (Holocene).

The first meteorite found at Morasko was uncovered in 1914 by German soldiers working on the construction of a military fortification. Since then, many further fragments have been found, including one weighing 78 kilograms (172 lb) in 1956.

In September 2006, Krzysztof Socha, a meteorite-hunter from Kielce, working for the Geology department of the city's Adam Mickiewicz University, uncovered with the aid of a metal detector a meteorite weighing 164 kilograms (362 pounds). At the time this was the largest meteorite discovered in Poland. Analysis showed that the meteorite contained, apart from iron-nickel alloy, a small quantity of silicates (pyroxenes) not occurring on Earth.

In October 2012, a meteorite weighing about 300 kilograms (660 lb) was recovered from a depth of 2.1 metres (6 feet 11 inches).

Adam Mickiewicz University is considering founding an educational centre, to draw attention to the reserve and the subject of meteorite discovery.

== Points of note ==
- The reserve contains the 154-metre-high Mount Moraska, the highest point in Poznań.
- The local bus lines 188 and 902 have stops a short distance from the reserve.
