= First to the Moon: The Story of Apollo 8 =

- Directed by: Paul Hildebrandt
- Produced by: Paul Hildebrandt; Jon Martin; Geoffrey Notkin
- Music by: Alexander Bornstein
- Release date: December 2018
- Country: United States
- Language: English

First to the Moon: The Story of Apollo 8 is a 2018 documentary film about the second crewed spaceflight mission in the United States Apollo space program, which launched on December 21, 1968. Apollo 8 was the first crewed spacecraft to leave low Earth orbit, reach the Moon, orbit it, and return safely to Earth. The film was released in December 2018 and has been screened at The Explorers Club in New York City, the Kansas Cosmosphere, and Arizona State University.

== Synopsis ==
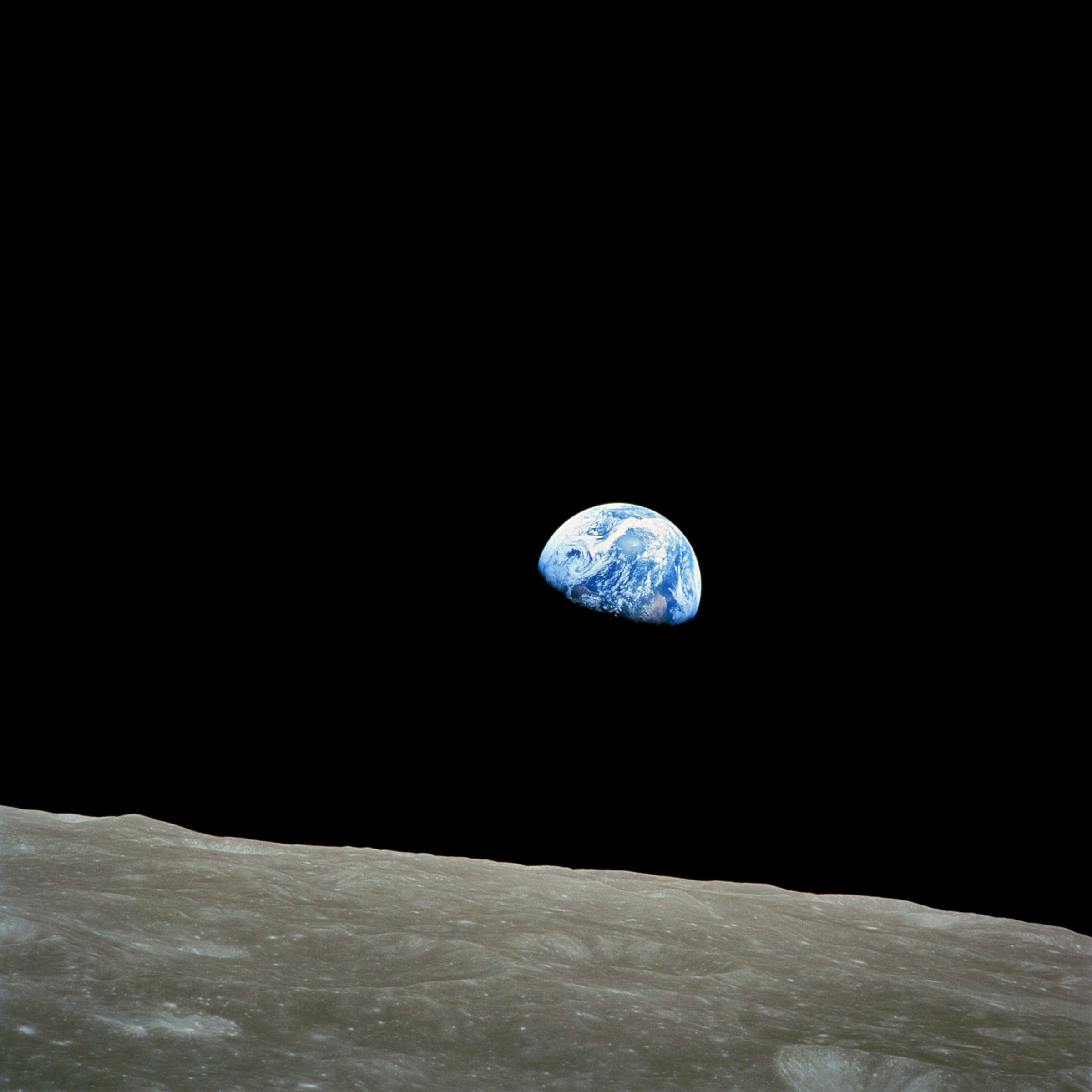
The Earthrise photograph, taken by Bill Anders.

The film follows the Apollo 8 mission and its crew, featuring archival material from NASA, the National Archives, and the astronauts' own personal collections. In a revelation, the documentary discloses that the famed Earthrise photograph captured by Bill Anders was unplanned.

== Reception ==
On Rotten Tomatoes, First to the Moon scored a 100% on based on 8 reviews.

== Participants ==
- Frank Borman, Commander
- Bill Anders, Lunar Module Pilot
- Jim Lovell, Command Module Pilot
