= Home on Lagrange (The L5 Song) =

1977 song by William Higgins and Barry Gehm

"Home on Lagrange (The L5 Song)" is a filk song, written in 1977 by William S. Higgins and Barry D. Gehm, intended to be sung to the tune of Home on the Range. It was inspired by the idea of placing large, self-contained space colonies into stable equilibrium at the L_{4} or L_{5} Lagrange points, which had been advocated by Gerard O'Neill. The song's lyrics satirize the enthusiasm of space-colony advocates.

A U.S. copyright has been registered on "Home on Lagrange (The L5 Song)." Higgins and Gehm originally published it in the magazine CoEvolution Quarterly in 1978. It was subsequently republished in many other media, including the NESFA Hymnal and the L5 Society magazine L5 News. It was anthologized in The Endless Frontier, a collection of stories about space colonization. The song was also quoted by historian W. Patrick McCray in his book The Visioneers. Today, it can be found at various websites on the Internet, often without attribution.

The chorus of "Home On Lagrange:"

Home, home on Lagrange,
Where the space debris always collects,
We possess, so it seems, two of Man's greatest dreams:
Solar power and zero-gee sex.
