= International Space Development Conference =

The International Space Development Conference (ISDC) is the annual conference of the National Space Society (NSS). Now in its 41st year, these conferences connect the general public and the NSS membership with leaders of contemporary space efforts. The ISDC provides a nexus for industry, government, scientists, advocates, and the public to meet and discuss the latest issues in space technology, science, policy, commerce, medicine, exploration, settlement and much more. Winners of the annual NSS Space Settlement Contest attend and give lectures at the conference, with several interesting activities and programs. With National Space Society's major goal being to accelerate the process of space exploration and development they also foster astronautics for students by encouraging them and getting them involved.

== 1982 ==
The first ISDC was held in Los Angeles in 1982. The CoChairmen were Jerry Pournelle and Milton Stevens, and most of the convention staff were volunteers from the Los Angeles Science Fantasy Society (LASFS), although it was emphasized that the conference was professional in nature, and would not be a science fiction convention. The Professional Guest of Honor was Fred Haise of Apollo 13, then CEO of Grumman. Attendees included Buzz Aldrin, Max Hunter, General Daniel Graham, Dick Rutan, and a number of space oriented professionals. Science Fiction author Robert Heinlein was the "fan guest of honor". It was intended as a one of a kind convention, but was successful enough that the attendees acclaimed it the "First Annual" Space Development Conference and voted to hold the second meeting in Houston with Art Dula as chairman.

== 2013 ==
The 32nd International Space Development Conference, was held at the La Jolla Hyatt Regency, San Diego, California, May 23–27, 2013. The conference theme is "Global Collaboration in 21st Century Space", inviting all nations of earth to join in the greatest human endeavor, to become an interplanetary species. ISDC 2013 was chaired by Dave Dressler of the "San Diego Space Society". The opening keynote speaker was Bas Lansdorp, CEO of Mars One. Former Indian president Dr. A. P. J. Abdul Kalam spoke at the Friday night Gala dinner about an international initiative involving six nations to build a Space Based Solar Power system (SBSP). Several astronauts presented at ISDC such as Buzz Aldrin, Christopher Ferguson and Mae Jemison.

== 2011 ==
The International Space Development Conference covers several broad areas of study related to building a spacefaring civilization, including transportation to and through space, technology needed to live and work in space, and Earth-based activities to advocate for or educate others about space development. The overall theme for ISDC 2011 is "From the Ground Up," emphasizing the tools, resources, and social activities that must be accomplished to make a spacefaring civilization a reality. Participants are encouraged not just to describe an ideal "future state," but to think about the technical, economic, or advocacy steps that must be accomplished to achieve a specific goal.

Although the northern Alabama region was hit by tornadoes April 27, resulting in widespread damage and many deaths and injuries, ISDC planners found that local electrical power had been restored to the Von Braun Center and Embassy Suites venues in Huntsville, and restored to the rest of the area within a week or two. Therefore, ISDC 2011 occurred on scheduled. Robert Bigelow, founder and president of Bigelow Aerospace, was the ISDC's Honored Keynote speaker at the Governors' Dinner and Gala. Mr. Bigelow also received the NSS Space Pioneers award for Space Development. The Space Pioneer Award for Science and Engineering was presented to the X-51A WaveRider Team while the prestigious Wernher von Braun award went to the JAXA Hayabusa Team. The von Braun award was presented by Frederick I. Ordway III.

== 2007 ==
Official ISDC 2007 logo "From Old Frontiers to New"

The theme for ISDC 2007 was "From Old Frontiers to New: Celebrating 50 Years of Space Flight" and was hosted by The National Space Society of North Texas chapter of Dallas, Texas over the Memorial Day weekend of May 24–28, 2007.

For the third straight year the presenting sponsor for ISDC '07 was the National Aeronautics and Space Administration (NASA). 2007's ISDC held two pre-conference events; the Symposium on Space Venture Finance on Thursday, May 24 and the bi-annual meeting of the Aerospace Technology Working Group (ATWG) from May 22 – 24.

ISDC 2007 included programs, presentations and exhibits focused on space exploration and settlement, astronomy and scientific research, commercial space ventures, space tourism, and other exciting topics.

The conference also featured displays of real spaceflight hardware, such as Armadillo Aerospace’s historic 'Quad' rocket vehicle. The Quad vehicles were built by space entrepreneur John Carmack and his Armadillo Aerospace team from Mesquite, Texas. One of the Quads, named "Pixel," recently competed in the Wirefly X Prize Cup in Las Cruces, New Mexico.

ISDC 2007 was held in Addison, Texas (metro Dallas area) at the Intercontinental Hotel. Speakers included NASA Johnson Space Center director Michael Coats, U.S. Congressmen Nick Lampson and Ralph Hall, Apollo 17 astronaut and former U.S. Senator Harrison Schmitt, Alex Tai, chief operating officer of Virgin Galactic, local space entrepreneur John Carmack, NASA astronaut Dr. Shannon Lucid, Mars Exploration Rover project leader Dr. Steve Squyers, Mars exploration visionary Robert Zubrin, lunar advocate Dr. Paul Spudis, Space Adventures CEO Eric Anderson, and legendary science fiction author Ben Bova.

Events included speaker tracks on Frontier Transport, Moon and Cislunar (between Moon and Earth) Space Development, The Martian Frontier, International Space Station (ISS) Science, Space Business & Law, Space Medicine, Space Sociology, Space Settlement, Education, faster than light travel, and Solar Power Satellites.

Other conference events included DPRG robot challenges, a game room, the premiere of "Postcards from the Future" and other space movies, filk singing, a kids program, book signings, a space art show and sale, and space-related exhibits. Some exhibits and the space art show were free to the public. For more information see the official website:

=== ISDC public webcasts ===
ISDC 2007 was broadcast "live" from Dallas via streaming video from May 25 through May 28, 2007 – courtesy of the helloWorld website. Available to anyone with access to a computer and internet connection, the general public was able to follow key remarks and presentations by running their computer's mouse or cursor over the TV broadcast tower graphic entitled "Shows" and clicking the "On the Air Now!" link. Archived files of past ISDC conferences can also be reviewed via the IslandOne website.

== 2006 ==
"...And we had the most successful ISDC ever..."

Although typically held over the Memorial Day holiday weekend, ISDC '06 was moved up to the first weekend in May to coincide with Space Day activities sponsored nationwide by Lockheed Martin.

The "Silver Anniversary" conference was held May 4 through May 7, 2006 in Los Angeles, California – coming full circle to the very first ISDC 25 years earlier. Held at the LAX Sheraton Gateway Hotel, this was also the first ISDC to be jointly co-sponsored with the Pasadena, California-based Planetary Society. Speakers and special guests included Buzz Aldrin, Burt Rutan, Elon Musk, Hugh Downs, Dennis Tito, Gregory Olsen, Bill Nye, Kim Stanley Robinson, Dr. Neil deGrasse Tyson and dozens of others from various scientific, entrepreneurial and artistic fields.

For a listing of papers scheduled to be presented at the conference, access the ISDC Archives, ISDC2005: Your Ticket to Space, or the ISDC 2006 Call for Papers.

Additionally, the National Space Society teamed up with the Space Tourism Society to host the 2nd annual ORBIT Awards, celebrating leadership in space tourism on the occasion of the fifth anniversary of Mr. Dennis Tito's historic flight as the world's first private space traveler, and the 25th anniversaries of STS-1, the first Space Shuttle mission and the ISDC.

== 2005 ==
ISDC 2005 was held in Washington, D.C. May 19–25, 2005 at the Sheraton National Hotel with the NSS Space Pioneers Awards banquet held at the National Air and Space Museum's Udvar-Hazy Center at Dulles Airport, hosted by NSS Board of Governors chairman and former ABC-TV "20/20" host Hugh Downs and the Honorable Norman Mineta, Secretary of Transportation.

NSS members met and debated aerospace pioneers like Burt Rutan, Elon Musk, and Peter Diamandis, while hearing the latest on the explorations of Saturn, Mars and extrasolar planets. A few of the many highlights: Presenting sponsor Transformational Space brought a new twenty-foot mockup of its new space vehicle, the t/Space CXT.

The Spaceward Foundation erected a forty-foot model of its upcoming space elevator competition. IMAX director Mark Cowen wowed the crowd with the inside story of NSS Governor and Academy Award winning actor-producer Tom Hanks' latest IMAX film release, Magnificent Desolation: Walking on the Moon 3D. Apollo 9 astronaut Rusty Schweickart announced a bold new plan to study the threat of Near Earth Object 2004MN4.

NASA's Centennial Challenges program announced a new prize competition for producing oxygen from Moon rocks. Virgin Galactic's Will Whitehorn shared the latest plans for their new personal spaceflight experience. Burt Rutan of Scaled Composites received the coveted Wernher von Braun award from German rocket engineer and Project Apollo space pioneer Konrad Dannenberg, then shared his personal vision of the future.

== Past conferences ==
Previous ISDCs have rotated around the United States and Canada in the following major cities:

- 1982 – Los Angeles, California
- 1983 – Houston, Texas
- 1984 – San Francisco, California
- 1985 – Washington, D.C.
- 1986 – Seattle, Washington
- 1987 – Pittsburgh, Pennsylvania
- 1988 – Denver, Colorado
- 1989 – Chicago, Illinois
- 1990 – Anaheim, California
- 1991 – San Antonio, Texas
- 1992 – Washington, D.C.
- 1993 – Huntsville, Alabama
- 1994 – Toronto, Canada
- 1995 – Cleveland, Ohio
- 1996 – New York City, New York
- 1997 – Orlando, Florida
- 1998 – Milwaukee, Wisconsin
- 1999 – Houston, Texas
- 2000 – Tucson, Arizona
- 2001 – Albuquerque, New Mexico
- 2002 – Denver, Colorado
- 2003 – San Jose, California
- 2004 – Oklahoma City, Oklahoma
- 2005 – Washington, D.C.
- 2006 – Los Angeles, California
- 2007 – Addison, Texas
- 2008 – Washington, D.C.
- 2009 – Orlando, Florida 2009 conference website
- 2010 - Chicago, Illinois
- 2011 - Huntsville, Alabama
- 2012 - Washington, D.C.
- 2013 - San Diego, California
- 2014 - Los Angeles, California
- 2015 - Toronto, Ontario
- 2016 - San Juan, Puerto Rico
- 2017 - St. Louis, Missouri
- 2018 - Los Angeles, California
- 2019 - Arlington, Virginia
- 2020 - Cancelled due to Covid
- 2021 - Virtual available on YouTube
- 2022 - Arlington, Virginia
- 2023 - Frisco, Texas (Dallas area)
- 2024 - Los Angeles, California
- 2025 - Orlando, Florida
- 2026 - Tysons Corner, VA (DC area)
- 2027 - Los Angeles, California

== See also ==
- List of astronomical societies
