= L5 Society =

Society promoting space colonization

The original L5 Society logo.

The L5 Society was founded in 1975 by Carolyn Meinel and Keith Henson to promote the space colony ideas of Gerard K. O'Neill.

In its early years, the L5 Society was deeply rooted in 1970s counterculture, driven by utopian goals of establishing space-based settlements as havens for communal living, environmental preservation, and social experimentation. However, internal tensions eventually rose over the potential weaponization of this space infrastructure. Ultimately, the Society's focus gradually shifted away from utopian settlements and more toward space commercialization and the Reagan administrations conservative space agenda.

During the 1980s, the L5 Society's advocacy for large-scale space infrastructure heavily influenced the development of the Strategic Defense Initiative (SDI). In 1981, L5 board member Jerry Pournelle helped form the Citizens' Advisory Council on National Space Policy, a group heavily populated by L5 members that drafted influential reports laying the intellectual groundwork for President Ronald Reagan's 1983 SDI announcement. Similarly, when Lt. Gen. Daniel O. Graham founded the High Frontier missile defense lobbying project, he recruited extensively from the L5 Society's grassroots membership. This ideological overlap led several space settlement advocates into formal defense roles. Planetary scientist Stewart Nozette translated his early L5 concepts for asteroid mining into dual-use space architectures as an SDIO program manager. Working alongside SDIO Deputy for Technology Michael D. Griffin, Nozette helped spearhead the SDI-funded Clementine mission, which successfully tested advanced missile detection sensors while mapping the Moon.

In 1987, the L5 Society merged with the National Space Institute to form the National Space Society.

== Name ==
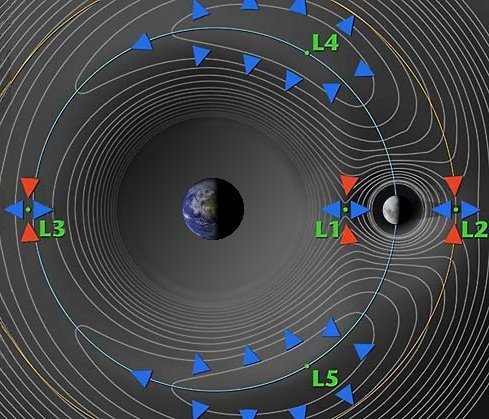
A diagram showing the five Lagrangian points in a two-body system, with one body far more massive than the other (e.g. Earth and Moon). In this system L_{3}–L_{5} will appear to share the secondary's orbit, although they are situated slightly outside it.

The name comes from the L_{4} and L_{5} Lagrangian points in the Earth–Moon system proposed as locations for the huge rotating space habitats that O'Neill envisioned. L_{4} and L_{5} are points of stable gravitational equilibrium located along the path of the Moon's orbit, 60 degrees ahead or behind it.

An object placed in orbit around L_{5} (or L_{4}) will remain there indefinitely without having to expend fuel to keep its position, whereas an object placed at L_{1}, L_{2} or L_{3} (all points of unstable equilibrium) may have to expend fuel if it drifts off the point.

== History ==
=== Founding of L5 Society ===
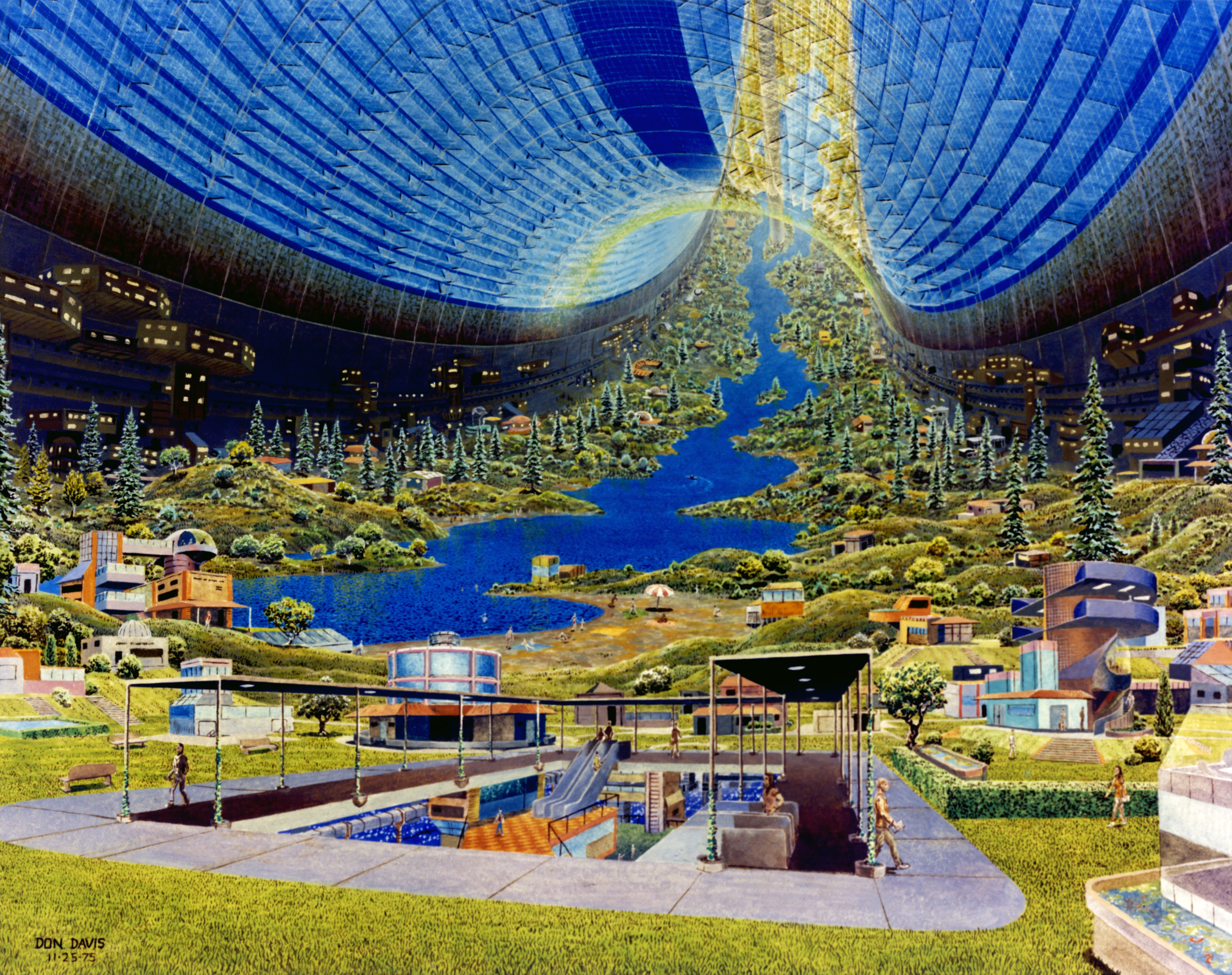
Artist's conception of a space habitat called the Stanford torus, by Don Davis.

O'Neill's first published paper on the subject, "The Colonization of Space", appeared in the magazine Physics Today in September 1974. A number of people who later became leaders of the L5 Society got their first exposure to the idea from this article. Among these were a couple from Tucson, Arizona, Carolyn Meinel and Keith Henson. The Hensons corresponded with O'Neill and were invited to present a paper on "Closed Ecosystems of High Agricultural Yield" at the 1975 Princeton Conference on Space Manufacturing Facilities, which was organized by O'Neill.

At this conference, O'Neill merged the Solar Power Satellite (SPS) ideas of Peter Glaser with his space habitat concepts.

The Hensons incorporated the L5 Society in August 1975, and sent its first four-page newsletter in September to a sign up list from the conference and O'Neill's mailing list. The first newsletter included a letter of support from Morris Udall (then a contender for US president) and said "our clearly stated long range goal will be to disband the Society in a mass meeting at L_{5}."

The Society had a highly eclectic membership; by 1984, one congressman observed that the membership was "five percent Democrat, five percent Republican, and ninety percent anarchist."

=== Moon Treaty ===
The peak of L5's influence was the defeat of the Moon Treaty in the U.S. Senate in 1980 ("... L-5 took on the biggest political fight of its short life, and won"). Specifically, L5 Society activists campaigned for awareness of the provisions against any form of sovereignty or private property in outer space that would make space colonization impossible and the provisions against any alteration of the environment of any celestial body prohibiting terraforming. Leigh Ratiner [a Washington lawyer/lobbyist] "played the key role in the lobbying effort, although he had energetic help from L-5 activists, notably Eric Drexler and Christine Peterson."

Although economic analysis indicated the SPS/space colony concept had merit, it foundered on short political and economic horizons and the fact that the transport cost to space was about 300 times too high for individuals to fund when compared to the Plymouth Rock and Mormon colonies.

=== Merger with National Space Institute ===
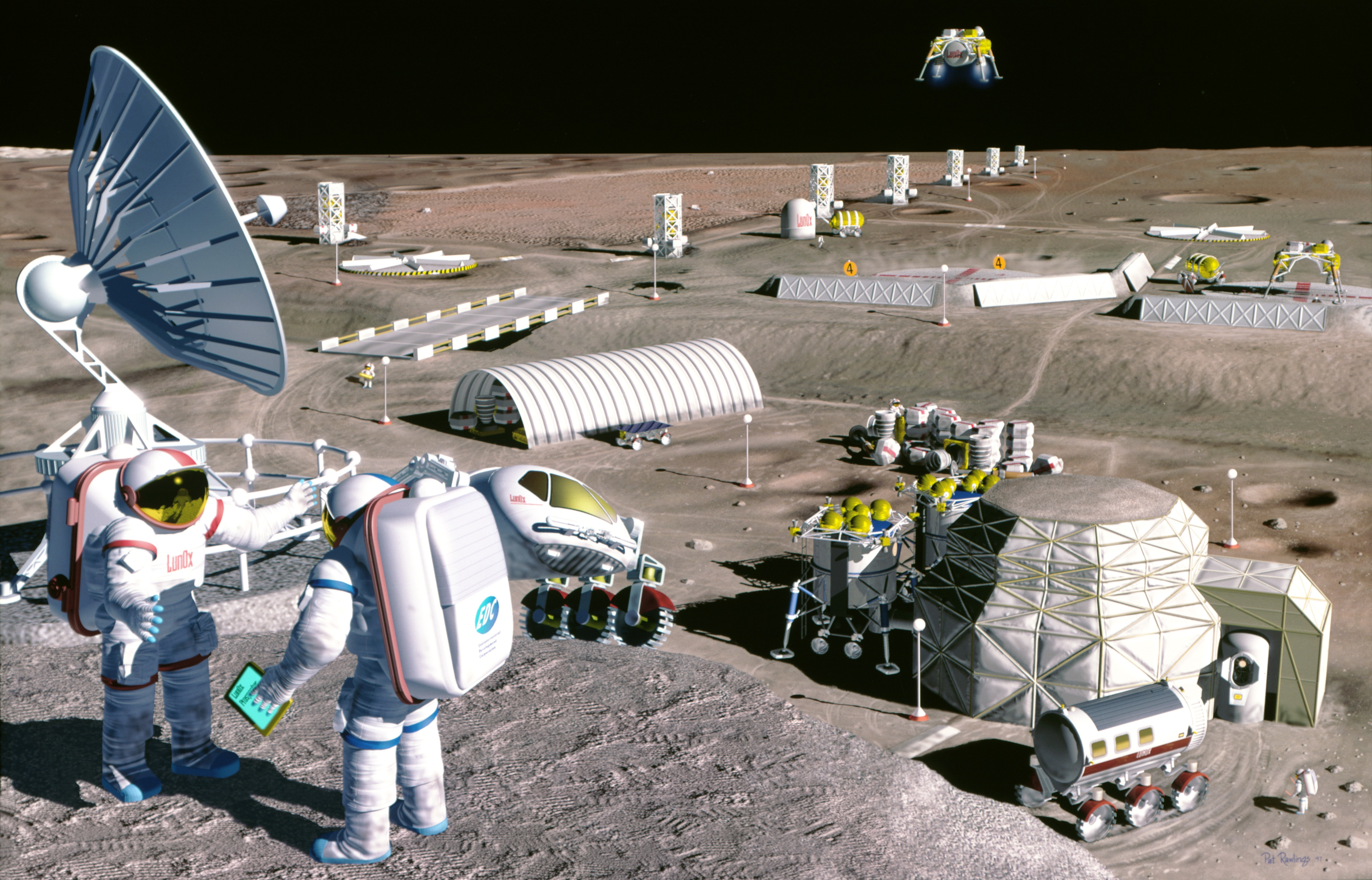
NASA concept art from 2001 of an envisioned lunar mining facility.

In 1986, the L5 Society, which had grown to about 10,000 members, merged with the 25,000 member National Space Institute, to form the present-day National Space Society. The National Space Institute had been founded in 1972 by Wernher von Braun, the former German rocket engineer of the WW II Nazi V-2 rocket/ballistic missile program, and of NASA's Marshall Space Flight Center and Project Apollo program manager.

While the L5 Society failed to achieve the goal of human settlements in space, it served as a focal point for many of the people who later became known in fields such as nanotechnology, memetics, extropianism, cryonics, transhumanism, artificial intelligence, and tether propulsion, such as K. Eric Drexler, Robert Forward, and Hans Moravec.

=== L5 News ===
The L5 News was the newsletter of the L5 Society reporting on space habitat development and related space issues. The L5 News was published from September 1975 until April 1987, when the merger with the National Space Institute was completed and the newly formed National Space Society began publication of its own magazine, Ad Astra.

== See also ==
- List of objects at Lagrangian points
- Home on Lagrange (The L5 Song)
- Planetary chauvinism
- Space advocacy organizations
- Space colonization topics
