= The Rock Garden =

Music venue in London, England

Coordinates: 51.5122°N 0.1225°W

The Rock Garden was a music venue located at 6/9 The Piazza, Covent Garden in London.

Opening in 1976, the basement venue hosted thousands of live music acts and became popular with up-and-coming punk rock and new wave artists of the time. It has been widely reported that U2 played their first London gig at the venue and that Dire Straits had a weekly residency at the club for a number of months. The Smiths played their first ever London show at the Rock Garden on the 23 March 1983. Talking Heads played the band’s first UK gig at the Rock Garden on 13 May 1977. Other artists that performed at the venue include: The Faces of Murpy, Iron Maiden, Symposium, The Police, XTC, Legacy of Lies, Adam and The Ants, Patti Smith and Suede and 101, former English punk rock band from London.

In 1990s it become a nightclub and music venue called The Gardening Club. In August 2010, Apple opened an Apple Store across 1-7 The Piazza, Covent Garden on the former site of the Rock Garden restaurant and the Gardening Club.
