= Level 5 =

Level 5, Level-5, Level Five, or Level V may refer to:

== Gradings ==
- Level 5, the lowest level of capability for a US trauma center (see Trauma center#Level V)
- Level 5, the highest level of automation in a self-driving car (see Autonomous car#Classification)
- Level 5, the highest level of security in US federal prisons (see Incarceration in the United States#Security levels)
- Level 5, a gradation in English rugby union system#Level 5
- Level 5, a gradation in English football league system#Promotion and relegation rules for the top eight levels
- Level 5, a gradation in German football league system#Regional association league systems

== Other ==
- Level Five (film), a 1997 French art film by Chris Marker
- Level-5 (company), a Japanese video game company founded in 1998
  - Level-5 Osaka Office, subsidiary developer of the company
- Level Five (EP), a 2001 EP by King Crimson
  - "Level Five", a song by King Crimson
- "Level 5" (King Gizzard & the Lizard Wizard song), 2026
- "Level 5: Judgelight", by fripSide, 2010
- Level 5 Motorsports, an American racing team founded in 2006
- STANAG 4569 protection level
