= Ad Astra (magazine) =

Quarterly magazine of the National Space Society

- Ad Astra, 2021, cover story: "Clash of the Titans"
- Frequency: Quarterly
- Founded: 1989; 36 years ago
- Company: National Space Society
- Country: United States
- Based in: Washington DC
- Language: English
- Website: adastramagazine.com
- ISSN: 1041-102X

Ad Astra is the quarterly magazine of the National Space Society (NSS). The name literally means "To the Stars".

== History ==
The magazine came into being following the merger of the L5 Society and the National Space Institute which became the NSS in 1987. The magazine was established in 1989. It is based in Washington DC. Currently, Ad Astra has a quarterly circulation of approximately 52,000 (print and digital).

Imaginova, publisher of Space.com, published Ad Astra from 2005 to 2008. From 2008 until the company closed, the magazine was published by MM Publishing. The magazine was briefly published by Space.com until 2010, then reverted to internal publication by NSS contractors. Since 2017, Rod Pyle has been Editor-in-Chief with Aggie Kobrin serving as the Director of Publications and Publication manager.

Regular columnists include John F. Kross, Rod Pyle, Pascal Lee, Melissa Silva, Jordan Strickler, Jeff Stepp, Frank White (of the Overview Effect), Dale Skran, Nancy Atkinson, Elizabeth Howell, and Leonard David. Casey Suire is the Senior Reviews Editor. The magazine features the artwork of James Vaughan. The Ad Astra staff includes Editor-in-Chief Rod Pyle, Managing Editor Aggie Kobrin, Assistant Editor Melissa Silva, Copy Editor Shaun Kobrin, Contributing Editor John F. Kross, with layout by Bookpress Publishing.

The magazine is typically 68 pages long, but occasionally publishes special editions (such as one on space education in 2023) over 100 pages in length. It is published in print as well as digital editions, and is available by subscription, by membership in the National Space Society, by membership in NASA Federal Credit Union, and in retail channels throughout the U.S. and Canada (primarily bookstores and newsstands).

== Awards ==
Hermes Awards:

- Gold Award 2024

MARCOM Awards:

- Gold Award 2023
- Gold Award 2009

Printing & Graphics Communications Association:

- Award of Excellence for 2003, 2002, 2001, 2000, 1999
- Best of Category for 2003, 2002
- Best Web Printed Piece for 2003

International Association of Business Communicators:

- Silver Inkwell Award of Excellence for 2002
