= Rod Pyle =

American author (born 1956)

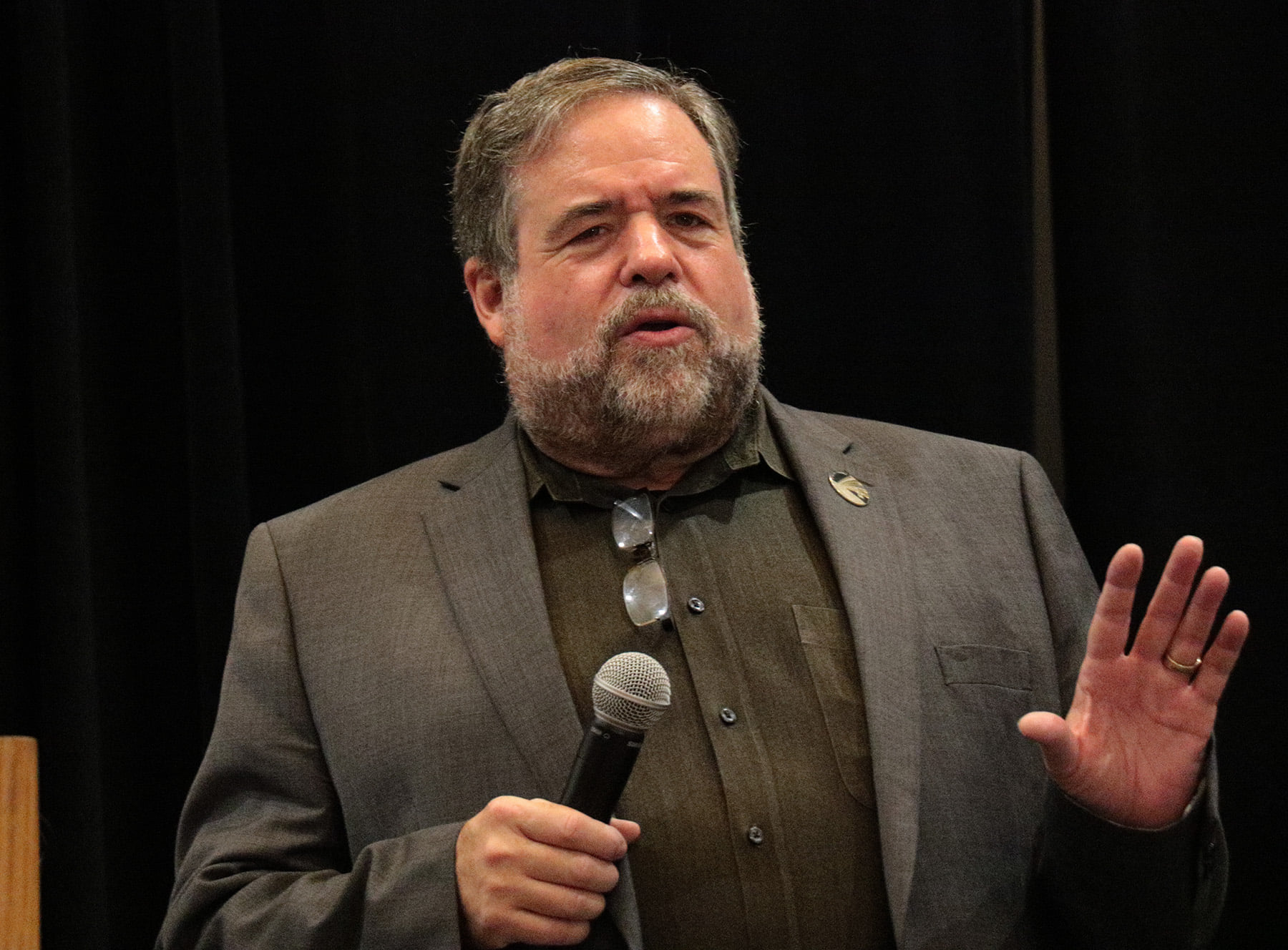
- Born: September 17, 1956 (age 69)

Website
- www.pylebooks.com

Rod Pyle (born September 17, 1956) is an American author, journalist, public speaker, and former television producer and educator who concentrates on subjects regarding spaceflight.

Pyle is the editor-in-chief of Ad Astra magazine, a print and digital quarterly published by the National Space Society. He is author of 20 general market nonfiction books and has co-authored four public reports for NASA’s Jet Propulsion Laboratory. Pyle has hosted two podcast series, including "This Week In Space" with Tariq Malik, and is a frequent guest on national and regional radio and appears on various television shows as a space expert.

== Education ==
Upon leaving high school, Pyle attended Pasadena City College for two years before entering the University of California at Los Angeles. He eventually received a Bachelor of Fine Arts from the ArtCenter College of Design in Pasadena, California, with an emphasis in film and television in 1994. He then received a master’s degree from Stanford University in 1995.

== Career ==
Pyle has been the editor-in-chief of Ad Astra magazine, the quarterly print and digital publication of the National Space Society, since 2017. He has authored 20 nonfiction books, mostly on space exploration, history, and development, since 2005.

== Books ==
Year	Title	Publisher	Notes	Reference
2003	In Their Own Words: Race Across Europe	First Person Press	Co-author	
2003	In Their Own Words: The Pacific	First Person Press		
2003	In Their Own Words: The Space Race	First Person Press		
2007	Destination Moon	Smithsonian Press		
2010	Missions to the Moon	Carlton Books	Foreword by Gene Kranz	
2012	Destination Mars	Prometheus Books	Foreword by Rob Manning	
2014	Curiosity	Prometheus Books		
2014	Innovation the NASA Way	McGraw Hill	Foreword by Lori Garver	
2016	Blueprint for a Battlestar	Sterling Books		
2017	Mars: Making Contact	Andre Deutsch	Foreword by James Green	
2017	Amazing Stories of the Space Age	Prometheus Books		
2017	Technology Highlights 2017	NASA Jet Propulsion Laboratory		
2018	Technology Highlights 2018	NASA Jet Propulsion Laboratory		
2019	First on the Moon	Sterling Publishing	Foreword by Buzz Aldrin	
2019	Interplanetary Robots	Prometheus Books	Foreword by James Green	
2019	Heroes of the Space Age	Prometheus Books		
2019	Space 2.0	BenBella Books/National Space Society	Foreword by Buzz Aldrin	
2022	Technology Highlights 2021	NASA Jet Propulsion Laboratory		
2024	NASA/NIAC Proceedings		(in process)	
2024	A Month on Mars		(in process)	

== Film and television ==
Year	Title	Role	Notes
1995-1997	Star Trek: Deep Space Nine	VFX Coordinator	Paramount TV
1998	The Osiris Chronicles	VFX Supervisor	Paramount TV
1993	Modern Marvels: The World’s Longest Bridge	Producer/Director	History Channel
1993	Modern Marvels: Apollo 11	Producer/Director	History Channel
1994	Modern Marvels: The Arch	Producer/Director	History Channel
2002	Battlestar Galactica	VFX Previz Producer	Paramount TV
2005	Beyond the War of the Worlds	Producer/Director	History Channel
