= Meteorite hunting =

Search for meteorites

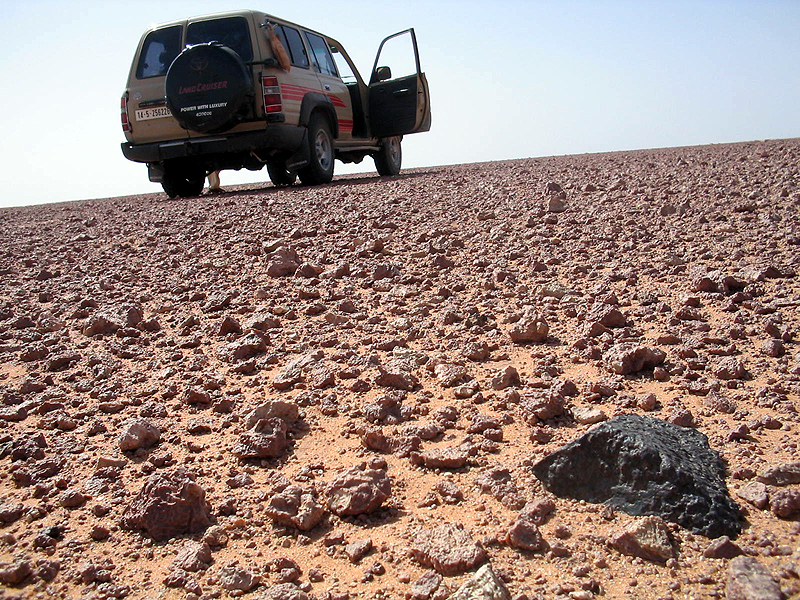
Desert prospecting for meteorites

Meteorite hunting is the search for meteorites. A person engaged in the search for meteorites is known as a meteorite hunter. Meteorite hunters may be amateurs who search on the weekends and after work, or professionals who recover meteorites for a living. Both frequently use tools such as metal detectors or magnets to discover the meteorites.

== Searching ==
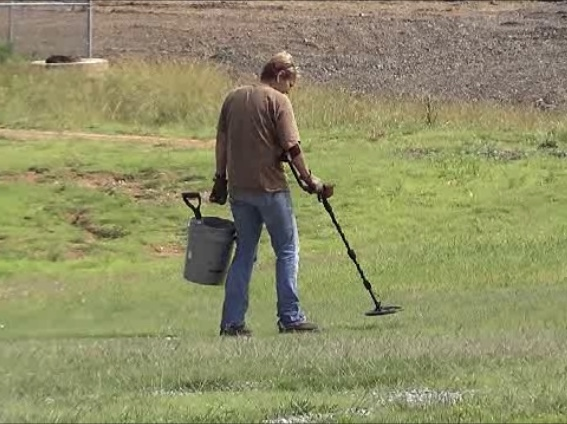
Metal detectors help hunters locate meteorites in a strewn field

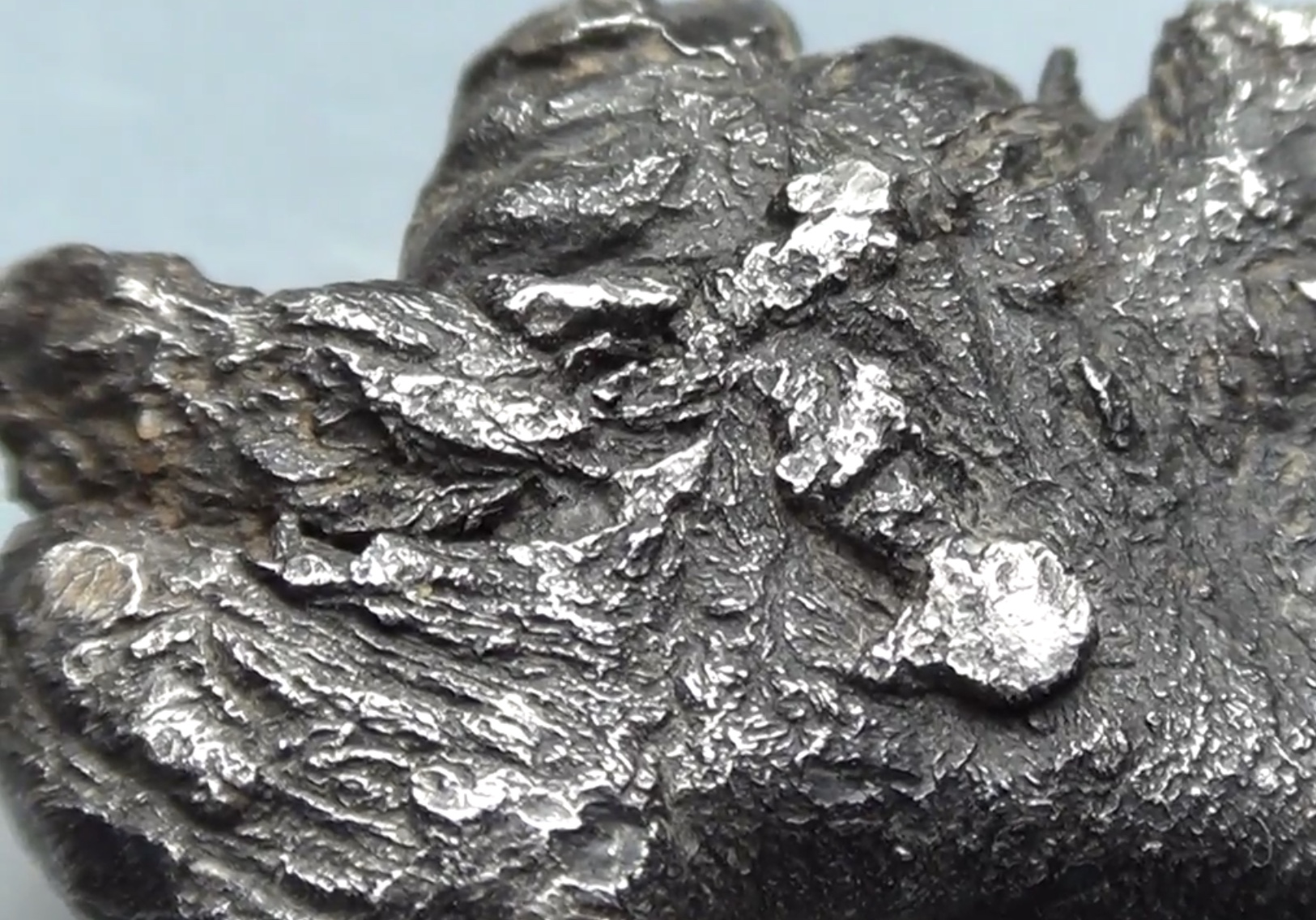
Meteorite hunters look for specimens that possess certain characteristics. A laboratory analysis by a qualified meteoriticist, however, is the only way to tell if a potential meteorite is genuine.

If the meteorite is of the iron or stony iron variety a magnet (usually mounted at the end of a stick) will pick it up from the soil surface or a metal detector will often detect it through many inches of soil. Stony meteorites —which make up the large majority of meteorites that fall— may not have a high enough nickel iron content to set off a metal detector. Large and very sensitive metal detectors may be used as well as ground-penetrating radar, lidar, and even landmine detectors.

Although meteorites fall uniformly across the globe they do not typically remain on the surface in areas with a large amount of yearly rainfall. If a newly fallen meteorite is not recovered within a few months it is likely to be buried with alluvium or covered by plant growth. Some arctic and desert regions have proven to be well-suited to preserving meteorites, and can provide excellent surfaces for hunting visually.

== Value ==
Meteorites can be very valuable to scientists studying planetary science and to collectors. Individual stones may weigh mere grams or hundreds of kilograms. Their values vary widely based on rarity and composition, as well as the conditions in which they are found.

== Meteorite hunting in the United States ==
=== Private lands ===
In the United States, most state laws state that a meteorite find belongs to the landowner of the land upon which the meteorite was found. This doctrine contrasts with the once-predominant rule in state courts on the finding of treasure trove, where buried gold or silver coinage (or paper money representing the same) is deemed to belong to the finder.

=== State lands ===
Many state courts have interpreted their laws as granting the state sole title to any meteorite recovered on state-owned lands.

=== Federal lands ===
United States laws and enforcement of laws regarding recovery of meteorites on federally owned public lands is unsettled. With respect to large meteorites, the federal government has asserted title to all such meteorites if proven to be found on federal land, because:

- the meteorite is the property of the federal government, the landowner
- meteorites found on public lands are subject to the 1906 Antiquities Act (16 U.S.C. 432)
- a meteorite does not qualify as a “valuable mineral” as defined under the 1872 Mining Law, and thus it is not subject to mineral claim rights that could otherwise be filed by the discoverer.

This policy derives from cases as far back as 1944, when the federal government supposedly seized the Drum Mountain Meteorite in Utah from a group of interned Japanese-American U. S. citizens. In reality, the meteorite was purchased for $700 by the US National Museum (NMNH). The federal government has sometimes agreed to negotiate a small finders fee for large meteorites, as with the interned Japanese-Americans, but has never agreed to pay anything resembling full market value of the meteorite to the discoverer.

In the case of small meteorites, ownership of meteorites found on federal land is not covered in the Code of Federal Regulations, and in the past hobbyists have been able to remove small quantities of rock for non-commercial use. However, as of 2010 the U.S. Bureau of Land Management (BLM) has asserted that it owns all meteorites recovered on BLM land, apparently arguing that BLM stands in the same position as a private landowner under state law. The BLM further asserts that under the 1906 Antiquities Act, all meteorites on BLM land belong to the Smithsonian Institution. A BLM memorandum of September 10, 2012, reaffirms that meteorites found on public land belong to the Federal Government. Permits can be acquired for systematic search for meteorites on public land undertaken for scientific, educational, or commercial purposes; casual, limited meteorite hunting does not require a permit.

== Meteorite hunting in Antarctica ==
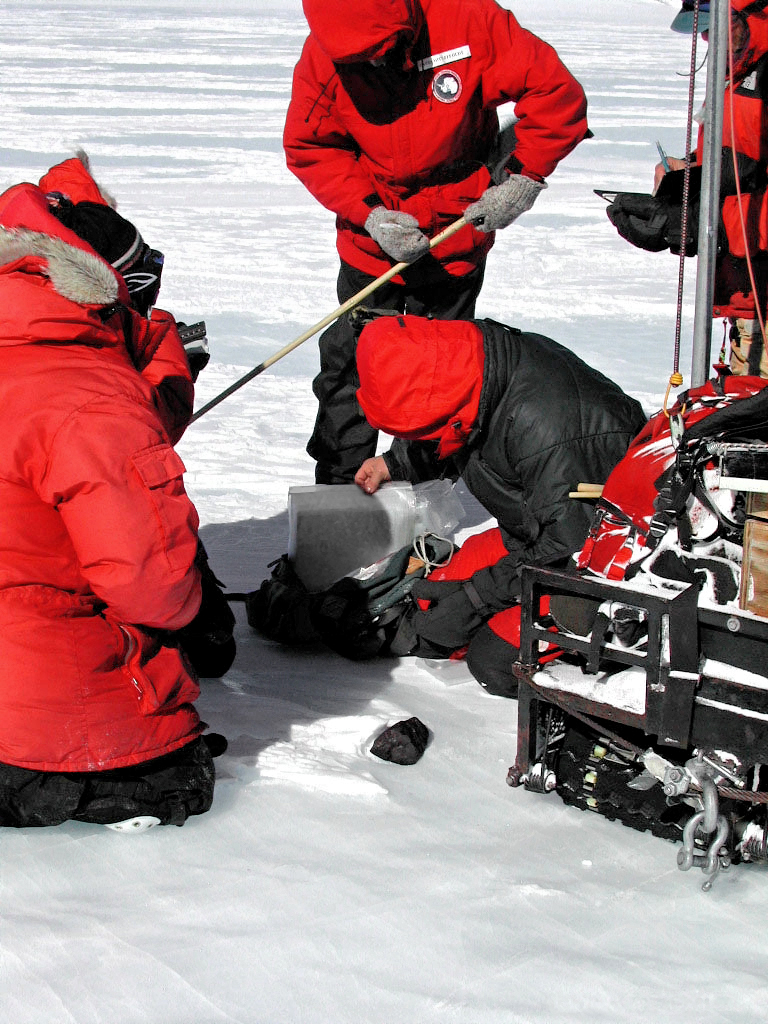
Prospecting in Antarctica, aided by the sharp contrast between dark meteorites and the snow-covered surface.

Antarctic prospecting is very expensive and therefore can only be carried on by well funded organizations. Approximately half of the meteorites found in Antarctica have been recovered by ANSMET (Antarctic Search for Meteorite program). The ANSMET program is a major source of the extraterrestrial material that is available for scientific investigation. Japanese finds make up the majority of the remainder, and China has recently begun exploration.

A popular geological feature employed by Antarctic meteorite hunters is an area where a natural downsloped plain meets an uprising ridge, such as where the East Antarctic Ice Sheet, creeping to the sea at about three metres (10 feet) per year, meets the Transantarctic Mountains. The downslope-mountain ridge combination allows the creeping gravity-driven icesheet to start rising sharply upwards. As it does so, the exposed snow and ice are removed by fierce winds and sublimation, effectively harvesting the embedded meteorites and leaving them to lie on the surface along the length of the mountain ridge.

The famed 1.93 kilograms (4.3 lb) Allan Hills 84001 meteorite, commonly abbreviated as ALH 84001 and believed to be from Mars, was found at Allan Hills, Antarctica in 1984. In 1996 NASA scientists announced that it might contain evidence for microscopic fossils of Martian bacteria based on the carbonate globules it contained.

== Meteorite scrambles ==
In the aftermath of a meteor air burst, a large number of small meteorites can fall to the ground, generally at terminal velocity, such as occurred with the 2013 Chelyabinsk meteor. When that occurs, people will often seek to locate and pick up the fragments due to their potential value. In the case of the Chelyabinsk meteor, many were located in snowdrifts by following a visible hole that had been left in the outer surface of the snow.

== Media ==
Meteorite Men is a U.S. television series following two atypical meteorite hunters.

== See also ==
- Glossary of meteoritics
