= National Space Society =

US nonprofit spaceflight advocacy organization

- Founded: 1987; 39 years ago
- Type: Space advocacy, 501(c)(3) Education
- Location: Kennedy Space Center, United States
- Region served: Worldwide
- CEO: Karlton Johnson (June 2024 - Present)
- Key people: Isaac Arthur (President, March 2023 – Present)
- Website: nss.org

The National Space Society (NSS) is an American international nonprofit 501(c)(3) educational and scientific organization specializing in space advocacy. It is a member of the Independent Charities of America and an annual participant in the Combined Federal Campaign. The society's vision is: "People living and working in thriving communities beyond the Earth, and the use of the vast resources of space for the dramatic betterment of humanity."

The society supports human spaceflight and robotic spaceflight, by both public (e.g., NASA, Russian Federal Space Agency and Japan Aerospace Exploration Agency) and private sector (e.g., SpaceX, Blue Origin, Virgin Galactic, etc.) organizations.

== History ==
The society was established in the United States on March 28, 1987, by the merger of the National Space Institute, founded in 1974 by Wernher von Braun, and the L5 Society, founded in 1975 based on the concepts of Gerard K. O'Neill.

The society has an elected volunteer Board of Directors and a Board of Governors. The Board of Directors provides day-to-day operational oversight for the organization, and the Board of Governors provide strategic oversight and advisory to the Directors in the form of recommendations and guidance with respect to the broad strategies, overall policies, objectives, and goals of the Society. The Chairman of the Board of Governors is Karlton Johnson, USAF-Retired. In this capacity, he provides overall senior executive leadership to enhance the effectiveness and performance of the Board of Governors in support of the Society's goals, imparts advice and guidance to the Board of Directors to enhance its conduct of business operations, and serves as the primary spokesperson for the Board of Governors. The Chairman of the Board of Directors is Kirby Ikin. Karlton Johnson is the organization's Chief Executive Officer.

Serving the space community for nearly 50 years in its various forms, the National Space Society has remained a conduit for education, substantive dialogue, and impact player in the commercial and private space sector communities. The organization garnered the "Five-Star Best in America" award by the Independent Charities of America organization in 2005.

In 2014, the National Space Society launched the Enterprise In Space program in order to ignite interest in space and science, technology, engineering, art and math (STEAM) education.

In 2023, the National Space Society elected Isaac Arthur as President for a two-year term.

On July 30, 2025, the National Space Society and all other space advocacy organizations announced the Day of Action on October 5 and October 6.

== Ad Astra ==
The Society publishes a magazine Ad Astra, which appears quarterly in print and electronic form.

== International Space Development Conference ==
The society hosts an annual International Space Development Conference (ISDC) held in major cities throughout the United States, often during or close to the Memorial Day weekend.

== NSS Chapters network ==
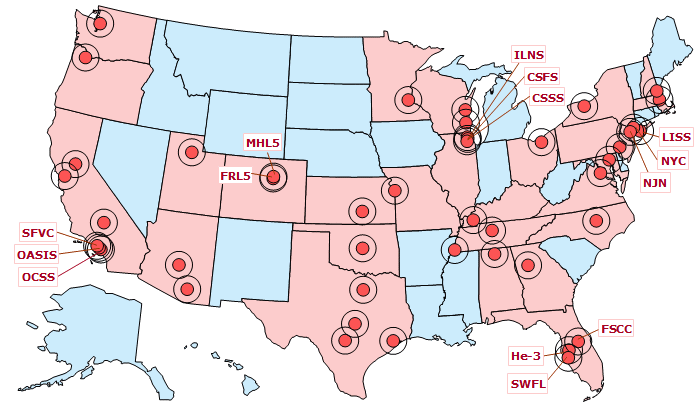
Locations and "sphere of operation" of NSS chapters in the United States (image courtesy of NSS)

As listed in each quarterly issue of Ad Astra, a large number of NSS chapters exist around the world. The chapters may serve a local area such as a school, city or town, or have a topical or special interest focus, such as a rocketry or astronomy club, or educational/community outreach program. Chapters are the peripheral organs of the society by organizing events, communicating with the public on the merits and benefits of space exploration, and working to educate political leaders.

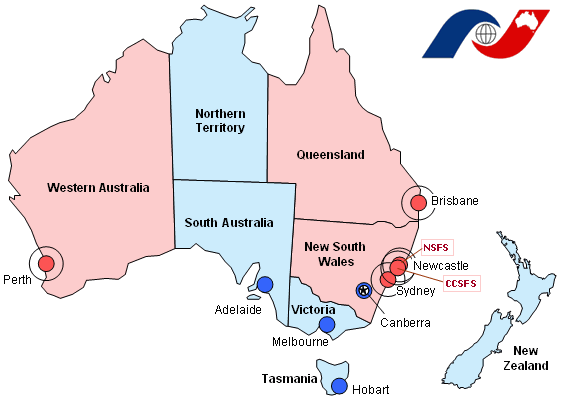
Location of NSS chapters in Australia (image courtesy of NSS)

=== National Space Society of Australia ===
A strong contingent of chapters is located in Australia. Prior to the NSI-L5 merger, the L5 Society had been developing chapters around the world, and in Australia, three chapters had been established. The 'Southern Cross L5 Society' was formed in 1979, with groups in Sydney, Adelaide (in 1984) and Brisbane (in 1986). It was decided in late 1989 to create the National Space Society of Australia (NSSA) which could act as an umbrella organization

Similar efforts have taken hold in Brazil, Canada, and Mexico, as well as European countries that have a strong aerospace presence. These include France, Germany, and the Netherlands.

== Awards ==
The society administers a number of awards. These are typically presented during the annual International Space Development Conference that NSS hosts. These awards are in recognition of individual volunteer effort, awards for NSS chapter work, the "Space Pioneer" award, and two significant awards which are presented in alternate years.

=== Robert A. Heinlein Memorial Award ===
The Robert A. Heinlein Memorial Award is given in even-numbered years (2004, 2006, etc.) to "honor those individuals who have made significant, lifetime contributions to the creation of a free spacefaring civilization."

Heinlein Award Winners:

- 2024 – William Shatner
- 2022 – Lori Garver
- 2018 – Freeman Dyson
- 2016 – Jerry Pournelle
- 2014 – Elon Musk
- 2012 – Stephen Hawking
- 2010 – Peter Diamandis
- 2008 – Burt Rutan
- 2006 – Brigadier General Charles E. "Chuck" Yeager
- 2004 – James Lovell
- 2002 – Robert Zubrin
- 2000 – Neil Armstrong
- 1998 – Carl Sagan
- 1996 – Buzz Aldrin
- 1994 – Robert H. Goddard
- 1992 – Gene Roddenberry
- 1990 – Wernher von Braun
- 1988 – Arthur C. Clarke
- 1986 – Gerard K. O'Neill

=== NSS Von Braun Award ===
The NSS Von Braun Award is given in odd-numbered years (1993, 1995, etc.) "to recognize excellence in management of and leadership for a space-related project where the project is significant and successful and the manager has the loyalty of a strong team that he or she has created." Awardees include:

Von Braun Award Winners:

- 2023 – James Webb Space Telescope Team
- 2021 – Gwynne Shotwell
- 2019 – Tory Bruno
- 2017 – Prof. Johann-Dietrich Wörner
- 2015 – Mars Curiosity Rover project Team
- 2013 – Dr. A.P.J. Abdul Kalam
- 2011 – JAXA Hayabusa Team
- 2009 – Elon Musk
- 2007 – Steven W. Squyres
- 2005 – Burt Rutan
- 2001 – Donna Shirley
- 1999 – Robert C. Seamans, Jr.
- 1997 – George Mueller
- 1995 – Max Hunter
- 1993 – Dr. Ernst Stuhlinger

=== Space Pioneer Awards ===
Space Pioneer Awards or NSS Space Pioneer Awards are the annual awards given by National Space Society, an independent non-profit educational membership organisation, to individuals and teams who have opened the space frontier.

Space Pioneer Award Winners:

- 2024 — Rod Pyle, Brian McManus, José Hernández
- 2023 — Jared Isaacman, Dr. Pascal Lee, Dr. David Livingston
- 2022 — Peter Beck, Rocket Lab, Kathryn Lueders, Ingenuity Mars Helocopter Team
- 2021 — Dr. Robert D. Braun, Robert Manning
- 2020 - Isaac Arthur, Steve Jurvetson, Dr. Peggy Whitson, Mission Juno Team, Dr. Scott J. Bolton, Dr. Phil Plait

=== Other scholarships and award activities ===
Other scholarships and award activities NSS provides or assists with include the following awards:

- The NSS-ISU scholarship, worth $10,000, to the International Space University was offered from 2005–2008. The 2005 recipient was Robert Guinness of St. Louis.
- The Gerard K. O'Neill Space Settlement Contest, an annual competition for students in grades 6 to 12 to design and present a permanent space settlement in the form of a research paper, essay, or artwork.
- The Martine Rothblatt Space Settlement in our Lifetime Prize, an annual competition for teams or individuals to submit complete business plans that can advance humanity to achieve the goal of expanding our species beyond Earth.

== Affiliations ==
The National Space Society is a founding executive member of the Alliance for Space Development.

== See also ==
- L5 Society
- Space advocacy
- Space colonization
- Space exploration
- Vision for Space Exploration
- Space Kingdom of Asgardia
