= Julia Cheiffetz =

American publisher, writer, and editor

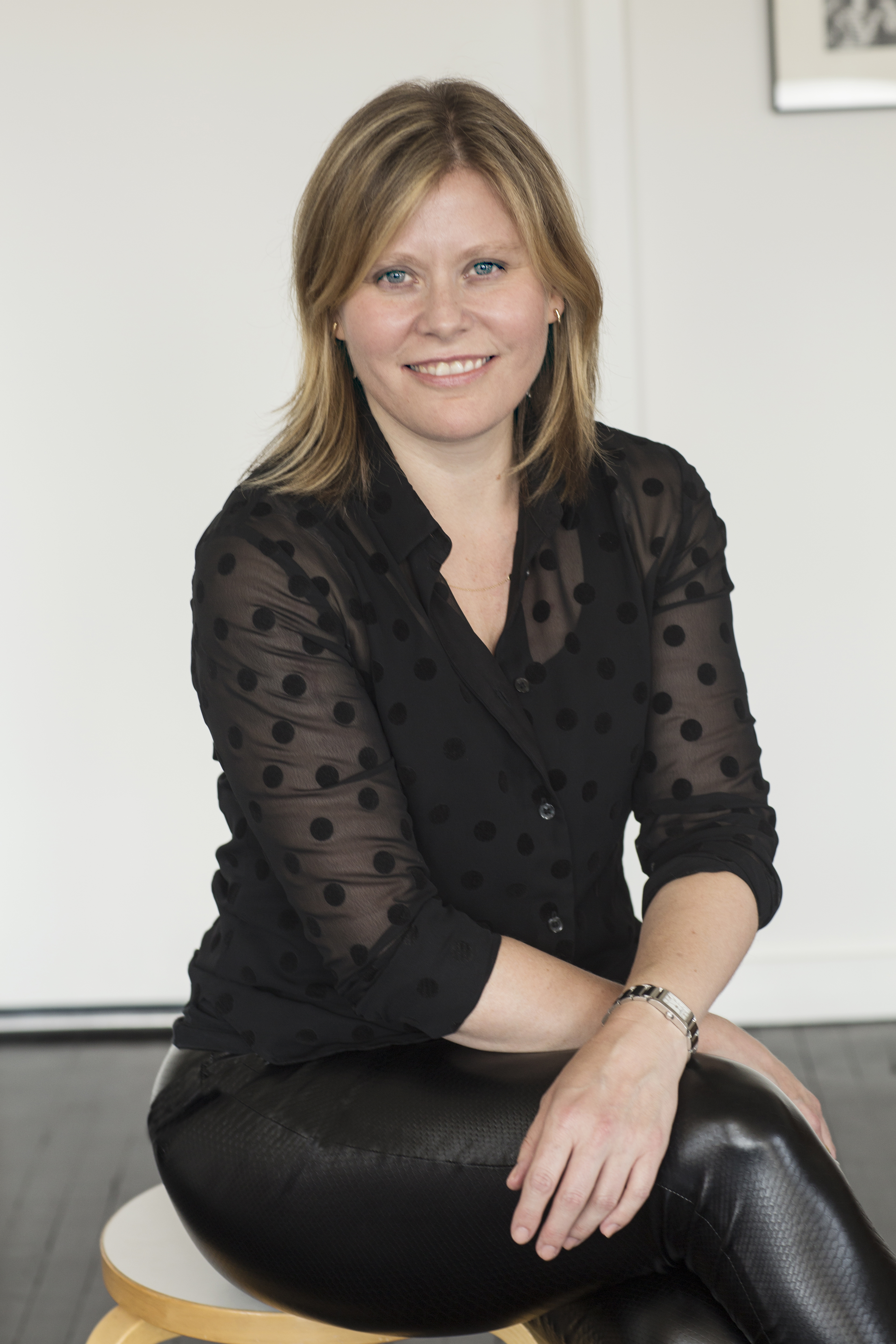
- Born: September 18, 1978 (age 47); Buffalo, New York, United States
- Education: Barnard College
- Occupation: Publisher at One Signal Publishers
- Spouse: Thomas Henry Walker III (m. 2009; div. 2019)

Julia Cheiffetz is an American publisher, writer, and editor who currently lives in New York City.

Cheiffetz launched One Signal Publishers, an imprint of Atria Books, a division of Simon & Schuster. She has published Harold Bloom, Stanley Fish, Greg Graffin, Erica Jong, Gayle Tzemach Lemmon, Stephen Marche, Cass Sunstein, Jessica Valenti, and Sam Wasson, whose breakout bestseller Fifth Avenue, 5 A.M. was widely acclaimed.

== Early life ==
Julia was born on September 18, 1978, in Williamsville, New York. She received her bachelor's degree from Barnard College in 2000.

== Career ==
After graduating from Barnard, Cheiffetz taught English in Yokohama, Japan, as part of the JET Programme. In 2002 she started her publishing career as an Editorial Assistant at Random House.

Cheiffetz spent the first six years of her publishing career at Random House where she published the controversial anthology This Is Not Chick Lit and the debut works of many writers including Karen Abbott and Ed Park.

In 2008 Cheiffetz acquired Devil in the Grove by Gilbert King which won the 2013 Pulitzer Prize for Nonfiction and was called "a richly detailed chronicle of racial injustice" by the Pulitzer committee. The film adaptation is currently in development.

From 2011 to 2014 Cheiffetz was the editorial director of Amazon Publishing. At Amazon, Cheiffetz led the New York City-based adult trade publishing team under Larry Kirshbaum, publishing Deepak Chopra, Timothy Ferriss, and Penny Marshall. Cheiffetz resigned from Amazon in July 2013, and shortly after her departure other editors left the company. She later wrote about her experience in a post on Medium that went viral and helped lead to changes in Amazon's parental leave policies.

In 2014 Cheiffetz was hired as Executive Editor at HarperCollins, where she commissioned and edited the New York Times best-selling book Notorious RBG: The Life and Times of Ruth Bader Ginsburg by Irin Carmon and Shana Knizhnik. In August 2016 Cheiffetz commissioned a memoir by NBC correspondent Katy Tur on her time covering Donald Trump's campaign. On October 1, 2017, Unbelievable debuted at #2 on The New York Times best-seller list underneath Hillary Clinton's memoir What Happened.

In 2019 Cheiffetz founded One Signal Publishers, an imprint of Atria Books, a division of Simon & Schuster. She has stated she likes to publish books that are “nutritional candy.”

== Personal life ==
Cheiffetz currently resides in Brooklyn with her daughter and their dog.

She is on the Board of Directors of the Lower East Side Girls Club.

== Bibliography ==
=== Selected bibliography as editor ===
- This Is Not Chick Lit by Elizabeth Merrick (2006) ISBN 9780812975673
- The Trouble with Poetry by Billy Collins (2007) ISBN 9780375755217
- The Essential Feminist Reader by Estelle Freedman (2007) ISBN 9780812974607
- Personal Days by Ed Park (2008) ISBN 9780812978575
- Sin in the Second City by Karen Abbott (2008) ISBN 9780812975994
- How to Write a Sentence by Stanley Fish (2011) ISBN 9780062006851
- Fifth Avenue, 5 A.M. by Sam Wasson (2011) ISBN 9780061774164
- Anarchy Evolution by Greg Graffin and Steve Olson (2011) ISBN 9780061828515
- Till I End My Song by Harold Bloom (2011) ISBN 9780061923067
- Devil in the Grove by Gilbert King (2012) ISBN 9780061792281
- The Dressmaker of Khair Khana by Gayle Tzemach Lemmon (2012) ISBN 9780061732478
- Notorious RBG by Irin Carmon and Shana Knizhnik (2015) ISBN 9780062415837
- The World According to Star Wars by Cass R. Sunstein (2016) ISBN 9780062484222
- Forward by Abby Wambach (2016) ISBN 9780062467003
- Sex Object by Jessica Valenti (2017) ISBN 9780062435095
- It's Okay to Laugh by Nora McInerny Permort (2017) ISBN 9780062419385
- Stealing Fire by Steven Kotler and Jamie Wheal (2017) ISBN 9780062429650
- Unbelievable by Katy Tur (2017) ISBN 9780062684929
- The Woman Who Smashed Codes by Jason Fagone (2017) ISBN 9780062430489
- Can It Happen Here? by Cass R. Sunstein (2018) ISBN 9780062696199
- Rabbit by Patricia Williams and Jeannine Amber (2018) ISBN 9780062407313
- The Gambler by William Rempel (2018) ISBN 9780062456786
- Dear America by Jose Antonio Vargas (2019) ISBN 9780062851345
- Hoax by Brian Stelter (2020) ISBN 9781982142445
- Keep Moving by Maggie Smith (2020) ISBN 9781982132071
