= Christopher Stott =

American businessman

Christopher Bryan Robert "Chris" Stott (born July 1969) is a Manx-born American space entrepreneur. He is best known for co-founding the regulatory and orbital frequency services company, ManSat, Odyssey Moon, and the International Institute of Space Commerce.

ManSat was covered in Forbes magazine in 2001. In 2010 he was named Celton Isle of Man Business Man of the Year.

Christopher Stott was born in July 1969, in Douglas, Isle of Man. He is married to Nicole P. Stott, an American astronaut. They have one son. They live near St. Petersburg, Florida.

== Education ==
Educated at Millfield School in Somerset, England, Chris Stott attended the University of Kent, Canterbury, where he obtained a Bachelor of Arts Degree, with Honours, in American Studies, Politics and Government. After matriculation from Canterbury, Stott received a Diploma from the University of California, San Diego, where he studied International Relations and Marine Policy (at the Scripps Institution of Oceanography). Stott also holds a master's degree in Space Studies from the International Space University (ISU).

== Career ==
Early in his career, Stott worked extensively in British and American politics as an office manager in the Parliament of the United Kingdom, and as an Intern in the US Senate and as a political aide on two US Presidential Campaigns. Stott also served as Special Projects Director with Life Education International, a children's health education and drug prevention program and United Nations Non-Governmental Organization (NGO). He has also taught international space law at the University of Houston–Clear Lake and lectured at the University of Houston Law Center.

Chris Stott was previously Director of International Commercialization & Sales with Lockheed Martin Space Operations' $3.4 billion Consolidated Space Operations Contract with NASA. He came to Lockheed Martin from the Boeing Space & Communications Company in Huntington Beach, California, where he worked International Business Development for the Delta Launch Vehicle program.

== Board membership ==
Chris Stott is currently chairman and CEO of ManSat, a Main Board Director of Odyssey Moon Ltd. Stott is also the Honorary Representative of the Isle of Man Government to the Space Community. He is a member of the International Space University (ISU)'s board of trustees and is a former Co-Chair of the School of Business and Management at the University. Stott was a founding member of the British Space Education Council and remains active in supporting space education initiatives.

Stott is also a Founding Trustee of the ISU International Institute of Space Commerce and the Manna Energy Foundation, working to bring renewable energy to developing nations via micro economics. He is an honorary member of the Manx Astronomical Association and of the Royal Astronomical Society. A Conservative, he is part of the Reform Club and Tory Reform Group. Stott is also part of the International Institute of Space Law and the International Institute of Space Commerce.

Stott serves on the board of the Society of Satellite Professionals International, the Challenger Centers, and the Conrad Foundation.

Stott co-authored the Adam Smith Institute work 'A Space For Enterprise: the aerospace industries after government monopoly'.
