= Optech =

Teledyne Optech
- Company type: Private
- Industry: Laser Surveying, Lidar
- Founded: 1974
- Headquarters: Vaughan, Ontario, Canada
- Key people: Allan Carswell (Founder) Michel Stanier (General Manager)
- Website: Teledyne Optech home page

Teledyne Optech is a for-profit company operating since 1974, and focusing on Laser-based survey systems. It started as Optech Incorporated, and was purchased by Teledyne Technologies in 2015.

Optech Inc is known for its association with Phoenix, a spacecraft launched for Mars in 2007.

== The company ==
The company is active in the markets of airborne laser terrain mapping systems, airborne laser bathymetry, industrial and 3D imaging, and space lidar solutions.

Optech's founder is Allan Carswell, who in 2006 received the John H. Chapman Award of Excellence by the Canadian Space Agency.

Robert D. Richards, Optech's former Space Division director, received an honorary doctorate (Doctor of Space Achievement honoris causa) from the International Space University which he co-founded with Peter Diamandis and Todd Hawley in 1987.

The company is described as a world leader in laser-based survey instruments and has 33 years of experience in lidars. Optech Incorporated created the world's first purpose-built mobile lidar platform, the Lynx Mobile Mapper, released in 2007.

In April 2012, Teledyne Technologies announced an increase in ownership of Optech by its subsidiary, Teledyne Dalsa, to a majority stake of 51%.

== Association with Phoenix ==
The company designed the lidar (laser radar) of the Meteorological Station Lidar Sensor (MET) on the Phoenix Mars lander. The lidar was built in collaboration with MDA Space Missions, Canadian Space Agency, and scientists from Canada and United States.

Dr Carswell was also the originating Canadian Principal Investigator for the Phoenix mission.

== Other projects ==
Optech, in association with MDA, also provided the lidar sensors of the United States Air Force's XSS-11 mission.
