= Universalization =

Concept in human development

Universalization is an incipient concept describing the next phase of human development, marking the transition from trans-national to interplanetary relations and much more aggressive exploitation of opportunities that lie beyond the confines of Earth. As both a process and an end state, universalization implies an increasingly pervasive, abiding and singular human focus not only on global issues per se but on social, technological, economic and cultural challenges and opportunities extending into the Solar System, the Milky Way Galaxy, and well beyond, where cooperation supersedes conflict negotiation. Its origins are associated with the incipient expansion of social, economic, and political relationships that have emerged in the wake of globalization and that increasingly define the planet, its place within the broader universe and the sustainability of humanity and its diversity.

== Overview ==
The concept was inspired by Kwame Anthony Appiah's work on cosmopolitanism, and particularly his emphasis on the need to develop a transcendent, collaborative model of human interaction that looks beyond the limited confines of current human relationships. Underlying principles and activities associated with universalization have also been discussed in a number of works dealing with prospective human exploitation of natural resources in space.

Evidence of the transition from globalisation to the century of "universalization" is provided by the exponential growth in outer space activity across all sectors of human endeavour, including exploration (global investments by national governments and consortia of $65 billion annually), governance (the United Nations Office for Outer Space Affairs, the International Association for Space Safety), commerce (aerospace industries such as Boeing, Teledyne, MDA), resource exploitation (Moon Express), Tourism (Virgin Galactic, XCOR), communications (satellites, probes, inter-planetary internet), education (the International Space University, Singularity University, International Institute of Space Commerce), research (observatories at Hawaii, Chile, the Square Kilometer Array, the Hubble Space Telescope, and settlement (Mars One).

Another reading of "universalization" has been suggested by Gregory Paul Meyjes. Questioning the various processes (economic, political, cultural) by which globalization or globalisation has favored expeditious Anglo-cultural dominance at the expense of a more broadly-based, gradually-emerging world civilization, Meyjes argues for cultural policies that support "ecological" relations between local ethnocultural traditions, to protect cultural specificity in the short term and thus to allow as great a variety of groups as possible to voluntarily and organically contribute to the global whole. Meyjes thus proposes universalization as a process of (largely) unfettered yet non-threatening exchange (such as with the aid of an International Auxiliary Language) between and among the world's state-level and sub-state-level groups and "nations" – i.e. a participatory transnational process that informs the gradual emergence of an optimally-inclusive world civilization.
