= Rempel =

Rempel is a surname. Notable people with the surname include:

- Aganetha Dyck (born 1937 as Aganetha Rempel), Canadian artist
- Byron Rempel (born 1962), Canadian writer
- Chad Rempel (born 1982), Canadian football slotback and long snapper
- Garry Rempel (1944–2018), Canadian scientist
- Jordan Rempel (born 1985), Canadian football offensive lineman
- Kevin Rempel (born 1982), Canadian sledge hockey player
- Michelle Rempel (born 1980), Canadian politician
- Nathan Rempel (born 1977), Canadian ice hockey player
- Shannon Rempel (born 1984), Canadian speed skater
- William Rempel (born 1947), American author and investigative journalist
- Samuel Rempel (born 2017), Brazilian child with a unique name

Rempel may also refer to:

- Rempel, Ohio, United States, an unincorporated community
