= Students for the Exploration and Development of Space =

International student organization

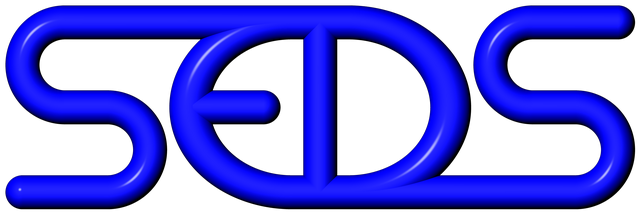
- Founded: October 30, 1980
- Founder: Peter Diamandis, Robert D. Richards, and Todd B. Hawley
- Type: Student Organization
- Purpose: "to promote the exploration and development of space"
- Origins: Started at MIT and expanded by letter to Omni magazine
- Region served: Worldwide
- Method: Student Collaboration and Connections with Space Companies
- Members: 10,000+
- Key people: Theo Courtois (current SEDS-USA Executive Director), Bella Morter (current SEDS-USA Chair), Mya McKinnon (current SEDS-Canada President), Shranchit Sachdeva (current SEDS-India Chair), Harry Szpuk (current UKSEDS Chair), Aleksandar Tashkovski (current Macedonian SEDS Chair)
- Endowment: USA: $1,290,000
- Website: seds.org

Students for the Exploration and Development of Space (SEDS) is a non-profit international student organization whose purpose is to drive space advocacy of space exploration and development through educational and engineering projects.

== History ==
Students for the Exploration and Development of Space was founded in 1980 at MIT by Peter Diamandis, Princeton University by Scott Scharfman, and Yale University by Richard Sorkin, and consists of an international group of undergraduate and graduate students from a diverse range of educational backgrounds and universities who are working to promote space. SEDS is a chapter-based organization with chapters in Italy, Canada, India, Israel, Mexico, Nepal, Nigeria, Philippines, South Africa, Spain, Turkey, United Kingdom, United States, Sri Lanka, and Zimbabwe. The permanent National Headquarters for SEDS-USA resides at MIT and that of SEDS-India resides at Vellore Institute of Technology. Though collaboration is frequent, each branch and chapter is independent and coordinates their own activities and projects.

=== 1980s ===
SEDS was founded on September 17, 1980, primarily by Peter Diamandis, Scott Scharfman, Richard Sorkin, Robert D. Richards, and Todd B. Hawley and their first meeting was held on October 30, 1980. After the initial meetings in 1980, SEDS president Peter Diamandis wrote a letter to the editor of Omni magazine deploring the status of the space program and asking students to help make a difference. The letter, published in Omni in early 1981, attracted students from around the world to SEDS. This laid the foundations for the first SEDS international conference, held at George Washington University between July 15–19, 1982. As the decade progressed, SEDS continued to have more international conferences, which rotated among schools including George Washington University (again), University of Alabama in Huntsville, and Caltech. During the end of the decade, UKSEDS was founded at the Science Museum (London) and held their first conference at the University of Cambridge during November 25–26, 1989.

=== 1990s ===
During the 1990s, SEDS continued to host a national conference each year, sometimes in conjunction with the International Space Development Conference through 1997, when the last "SEDS National Conference" was held (conferences would re-appear 7 years later as the "SEDS SpaceVision Conference"). UKSEDS continued to have national conferences at rotating locations each year. During the last years of the decade, there was a major decline in SEDS leadership and a connected drop in the number of member chapters around the United States.

=== 2000s ===
In 2004, the SEDS National Conferences were re-established by MITSEDS and hosted on the campus of the Massachusetts Institute of Technology on November 11–14. The conference was renamed the SEDS SpaceVision conference and featured many speakers who would return year after year during this decade, including Loretta Hidalgo Whitesides, founder Dr. Robert Richards, Rick Tumlinson, George T. Whitesides, Robert Zubrin, and Pete Worden. The SpaceVision conference then visited University of Illinois at Urbana-Champaign (2005), University of Central Florida (2006), the Massachusetts Institute of Technology (2007), Texas A&M University (2008), University of Arizona (2009), University of Illinois at Urbana-Champaign (2010), University of Colorado at Boulder (2011), University at Buffalo (2012), Arizona State University (2013), UNC Chapel Hill (2014), Boston University (2015), Purdue (2016), University of Central Florida (2017), University of California, San Diego (2018), Arizona State University (2019), virtually for 2020, Rice University (2021), University of Chicago (2022) and Georgetown University (2023). During this time, UKSEDS continued to have one national conference each year. SEDS India, after hosting the SEDS International conference in 2007, continued with SEDS India National Conferences every year since 2009 at Vellore Institute of Technology, India. SEDS also began exploring innovative national projects such as fund-raising for a joint SEDS chapter Zero-G flight and designing an innovative national Rockoon competition modeled after the Ansari X PRIZE.

=== Active SEDS-USA projects ===
SEDS-USA organizes annual and rolling projects to engage its members in space-related activities. Two such projects are:

==== SEDS High-Power Rocketry Competition ====
This is a competition between chapters designed to challenge students in high-power rocketry. The goal of the competition is to launch a rocket, designed and built by the chapter members, to an altitude of 10,000 feet above sea-level. This competition has now successfully been running since 2011. The winner of the 2012 competition was Purdue-SEDS.

==== Student NewSpace Business Plan Competition ====
Started in 2011, this competition is co-organized with the Space Frontier Foundation and aims to provide students with a real-world experience in entrepreneurship applied to the space industry. Students are required to develop space-scalable business models that will advance the NewSpace movement and are judged by a panel of 5 experts who have had several years of experience in space entrepreneurship. The winners of the 2011 and 2012 competitions were Illinois State University and Iowa State University respectively.

== International branches ==
SEDS is organized by country, region, and chapter. There is a large contingent of SEDS chapters in the United States, which are governed regionally and nationally by SEDS-USA. SEDS India has nine SEDS chapters under it and is headquartered at Vellore Institute of Technology. UKSEDS is composed of five regions across the United Kingdom and has its headquarters at the British Interplanetary Society HQ in London. There are other national sections of SEDS across the world, notably SEDS-Canada, SEDS South Africa, and SEDS Zimbabwe, which has four chapters and a junior chapter. Student leaders of the international groups convene as SEDS-Earth, the global governing body of SEDS. SEDS is an organization member of the Alliance for Space Development.

=== SEDS-USA ===
SEDS-USA
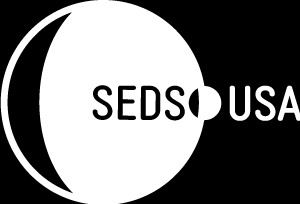
- Type: Non Profit Student Organization
- Purpose: "To promote the exploration and development of space."
- Region served: USA
- Method: Student Collaboration
- Website: http://seds.org/

SEDS-USA is the governing body of all chapters in the United States, and is the largest and original branch of SEDS. It is overseen by a national board of directors, board of advisors, and a board of trustees. An integral aspect of SEDS-USA is the Council of Chapters (CoC). This council consists of national representatives of each chapter and is led by the Chair of the Council of Chapters. The CoC meets via teleconference to exchange updates between individual chapters and the national board. The 2025–26 national directors of SEDS-USA are listed below.

Position	Description	Board Member
Chair	Preside over board and oversee decision-making process.	Isabella Morter (Texas A&M University)
Vice-chair	Alumni and Advisers liaison. Leads fundraising efforts.	Trevor Darr (Duke University)
Treasurer	Keep financial records and control legal and financial matters.	Samantha Stein (Embry-Riddle Aeronautical University)
Council of Chapters Chair	Conduct CoC meetings and work with SEDS-USA chapters.	Arielle Misra (Duke University)
Secretary	Set up meeting rooms for SEDS-USA national meetings and take minutes.	Camila Roman (Florida State University)
Member At-Large (1)	Work on general tasks that require action within SEDS-USA.	Ansh Patel (Texas A&M University)
Member At-Large (2)	Work on general tasks that require action within SEDS-USA.	Ian Matthew (Embry-Riddle Aeronautical University)

=== UKSEDS ===
UKSEDS
- Founded: 1988
- Type: Non-Profit Student Organisation
- Purpose: "To promote the exploration and development of space."
- Region served: United Kingdom
- Method: Student Collaboration
- Members: 1400+
- Key people: Harry Szpuk (Chair); Kennedy Kouloumbris (Vice-Chair); Desmond Li (Treasurer); Daniel Lobo (Secretary); Blessing Ogunlade(Exec At-Large); Hamnah Javed(Exec At-Large)
- Website: UKSEDS

UK Students for the Exploration and Development of Space (UKSEDS) is the national student space society of the United Kingdom. Established in 1988, it is dedicated to promoting the exploration and development of space by inspiring, educating, and supporting students and young professionals interested in the space industry. UKSEDS provides a platform for student collaboration on space projects, organises high-profile conferences and workshops, and conducts outreach activities aimed at fostering interest in space science and engineering among young people. The organisation acts as a bridge, building strong links between students, academia, and the wider space industry, both within the UK and internationally.

=== Founding and early history ===
UKSEDS was inspired by the efforts of students who attended the first International Space University (ISU) Space Studies Program held at MIT in 1988. Recognizing the potential to create a national community of space enthusiasts, these students organised a founding conference at London's Science Museum in March 1989. Later that year, a full conference was held at Cambridge University, cementing UKSEDS as a key player in the UK's space community.

In 2013, UKSEDS celebrated its 25th anniversary. Former committee members shared insights into UKSEDS’ development and contributions over the years. Dr Chris Welch, UKSEDS Chair from 1993 to 1995, recalled his initial involvement with SEDS and ISU during the International Astronautical Congress (IAC) in Brighton in 1987, where he met key figures like Peter Diamandis and Todd Hawley.

Dr Ralph D. Lorenz, a founding committee member from 1988 to 1989, emphasised the importance of student-driven initiatives in sustaining UKSEDS amidst existing organisations like the British Interplanetary Society (BIS) and the Royal Aeronautical Society (RAeS). Similarly, Richard Osborne highlighted the critical roles of Chris Welch and Mark Bentley in ensuring the organisation's continuity during challenging periods in the early 1990s.

=== Activities and initiatives ===
UKSEDS offers a wide range of activities designed to engage students and foster their development:

- National Student Space Conference (NSSC): An annual event that brings together students, academics, and industry professionals to discuss the latest advancements in space exploration and development. The NSSC features keynote speeches, panel discussions, workshops, and a careers fair.
- Competitions and Challenges: Regular events such as the Satellite Design Competition encourage students to apply theoretical knowledge to practical projects, fostering innovation and technical skills.
- Workshops and Webinars: Hands-on training sessions and talks by industry leaders help members develop technical and professional skills. Topics range from rocketry and satellite design to leadership and project management.
- Outreach Programmes: UKSEDS organises public engagement events to inspire the next generation of scientists and engineers. These include school visits, public lectures, and participation in STEM fairs.
- Project Support: Provides funding, mentorship, and resources for student-led space projects across universities in the UK. This support enables students to undertake ambitious projects, from CubeSats to high-altitude balloons.

=== Notable projects and initiatives ===
UKSEDS has undertaken numerous technical space projects, including:

- The Fluid Loop Actuator (FLA): Developed by UKSEDS members at the University of Kent and Canterbury High School, this device was designed to assist astronauts in zero gravity. It was test flown on parabolic flights by the European Space Agency (ESA) in 1993.
- ASPIRE I: A sounding rocket developed by members from the Universities of Bath, Bristol, Cambridge, and Kent. Sponsored by Serco Space, British Airways, Irvin Parachutes, ICI, and Dynamit Nobel, ASPIRE I was launched in 1992 and once held UK amateur rocketry records for speed and altitude.
- Espy Microsatellite: An educational microsatellite intended for Low Earth Orbit (LEO) launch, aimed at engaging educational organisations, particularly schools, with space projects. Although ultimately not launched, it represented an early attempt at integrating educational outreach with space technology.
- UKube-1 Payload (myPocketQub442): Part of the UK's first CubeSat mission, contributing to small-scale satellite research and development.
- Asteroid Search Campaigns: Collaborations with the International Asteroid Search Collaboration (IASC) to engage students in asteroid detection and tracking initiatives.

=== Structure and governance ===
UKSEDS operates under the guidance of an Executive Committee, elected annually at the organisation's Annual General Meeting (AGM) during its flagship conference, the National Student Space Conference (NSSC). The committee is responsible for overseeing day-to-day operations, planning events, and ensuring alignment with the organisation's goals.

In addition to the executive committee, UKSEDS is supported by a Board of External Trustees, who are appointed for three-year terms. The trustees provide strategic oversight and ensure the organisation remains sustainable and impactful.

The 2026/27 Executive Committee was elected and includes the following members:

Executive Committee 2026/27
Position	Description	Executive Member
Chair	Presides over the board and ensures adherence to the Constitution.	Harry Szpuk (University of Nottingham)
Vice-chair	Supports the chair in their duties.	Kennedy Kouloumbris (University of Edinburgh)
Treasurer	Oversees financial administration.	Desmond Li (University of Bristol)
Secretary	Documents Board meeting minutes and distributes materials.	Daniel Lobo (Coventry University)
Exec At-Large	Works on general tasks requiring action within UKSEDS.	Blessing Ogunlade (University of Bristol)
Exec At-Large	Works on general tasks requiring action within UKSEDS.	Hamnah Javed (University College London)

=== Partnerships and affiliations ===
UKSEDS collaborates with various organisations to advance its mission, including:

- British Interplanetary Society: A partnership that facilitates knowledge exchange and collaborative projects.
- European Space Agency (ESA): Provides opportunities for UKSEDS members to engage with ESA missions and programs.
- Industry Partners: Collaborations with companies like Serco Space, British Airways, and Dynamit Nobel support UKSEDS projects and competitions.

In 2013, UKSEDS formalised a Memorandum of Understanding with the British Interplanetary Society, enhancing cooperation between young members and experienced professionals.

=== Notable alumni and past committee members ===
UKSEDS has had many prominent individuals serve on its executive committee, contributing to its development and influence in the space sector. Some notable past committee members include:

- Will Marshall – Co-founder and CEO of Planet Labs, served as a key member of the UKSEDS Executive Committee during his student days, going on to lead one of the most successful space-based Earth imaging companies.
- Libby Jackson – Head of Human Spaceflight and Exploration at the UK Space Agency, was a former UKSEDS committee member who went on to become one of the UK's most influential figures in human spaceflight.
- Mark Bentley – Former Chair (1999/2000), instrumental in revitalising UKSEDS during challenging periods.
- Andrew Ball – Former Secretary (1994–1996), now working on Mars exploration for the European Space Agency in the Netherlands.
- Jason Hatton – Vice Chair of the Founding Committee (1988–89), now Biology and Environmental Monitoring Science Coordinator in the ISS Utilisation and Astronaut Support Department at ESA ESTEC.

=== SEDS-Canada ===
SEDS-Canada is a federally incorporated not-for-profit organization based in Toronto, Canada, whose mandate is to advocate for the exploration and development of space through non-partisan political advocacy, conferences, student competitions, and chapter grants. The organization was initiated in early 1981 by entrepreneur Bob Richards, and it was re-established in 2014 by a group of students from the University of Toronto and the University of Western Ontario, after several years of inactivity. SEDS-Canada currently has eleven university chapters operating across the country.

=== SEDS-Italy ===
SEDS Italy
- Founded: 2021
- Type: Non-profit student organization
- Purpose: Student collaboration in space/aerospace education and outreach
- Headquarters: Italy
- Region served: Italy
- Key people: Riccardo Morelli (President) Vincenzo Di Pietro (General Secretary); Christian Morganella (Federal Coordinator); Zoe Votta (Head of Projects); Ruben Arena (Head of Marketing & IT); Luna Rita Veraldi (Head of HR); Gabriele Di Carmelo (Treasurer); Viola Asti (Head of Marketing & IT) Mattia Paglionico (Head of Events)
- Website: https://www.sedsita.it/

SEDS Italy (Italian: SEDS Italia) is the Italian student network associated with Students for the Exploration and Development of Space (SEDS). It was founded in 2021. The organization lists university delegations in Italy, including at Bocconi University, LUISS Guido Carli, Sapienza University of Rome, Polytechnic University of Bari, Politecnico di Milano, University of Eastern Piedmont, Polytechnic University of Turin, and the University of Naples Federico II. University communications have described local university groups as delegations of SEDS Italy, and the organization has been listed among participants in Italian aerospace-related events. SEDS Italy has also appeared as an affiliation in International Astronautical Federation conference materials, including the International Astronautical Congress. SEDS Italy organizes the annual SEDS Italy Space Conference (SISC); the 2025 edition took place at the Politecnico di Bari.

=== SEDS-Turkey ===
Space Exploration and Development of Space Turkey, founded in March 2017 by Hadican Çatak at Hacettepe University, is the first and only national space, and entrepreneurial organization with its 350+ active members and branches in 8 universities as of January 2019.

SEDS TR's goal is to gather all interested undergraduates, master's degree students, and doctoral students and to carry out tasks that help them improve their career prospects in their field of activity by establishing a common working platform.

In order to reach this goal, SEDS TR has been working on engineering projects, organizing events and extending its area of effect by founding SEDS organizations in universities throughout Turkey and in respect to this, SEDS is trying to make operations and work done mentioned above accessible to every other student in Turkey.

=== SEDS-UAE ===
The SEDS-UAE Chapter is based at the Our Own English High School in Abu Dhabi. This chapter was founded by a high school student, Nishirth Khandwala. Members of SEDS UAE engage themselves in various activities and programs such as the International Asteroid Search Campaign.

=== SEDS South Africa ===
SEDS-South Africa is South Africa's national student Space society, and is the governing body of all SEDS chapters in South Africa. SEDS South Africa is made up of students and young professionals in Southern Africa who are interested in Space exploration and development. This includes engaging government policymakers, amateur satellite building, model rocketry, manufacturing in Space, student and young professionals collaboration, connecting with the Space industry, ham amateur radio, analogue Space missions, Space exploration, and Space technology to benefit humankind.

SEDS South Africa's founding branch is the University of Cape Town, SEDS-SA-UCT. Branches include:

- SEDS-SA-Wits,
- SEDS-SA-UP, and
- SEDS-SA-UCT.

=== SEDS India ===
SEDS INDIA
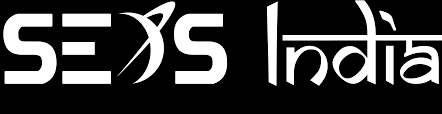
- Type: Non Profit Student Organization
- Purpose: "To promote the exploration and development of space"
- Headquarters: VIT, Vellore
- Region served: INDIA
- Method: Student Collaboration
- Key people: Dr. Geetha Manivasagam (Trustee of SEDS India)
- Website: https://www.sedsindia.org/

SEDS-India is the governing body of SEDS in India with its headquarters at Vellore Institute of Technology. SEDS India was founded in 2004 by Pradeep Mohandas and Abhishek Ray. The first chapter was established in Mumbai at PIIT, New Panvel. SEDS India governs affiliated chapters in India at various universities, including Vellore Institute of Technology, Veltech University,Birla Institute of Technology and Science, Pilani - Hyderabad Campus, Birla Institute of Technology & Science Pilani-K. K. Birla Goa Campus, Sri Ramakrishna Engineering College and SASTRA University. Chapter affairs are controlled by the Local Chapter Committee which reports to the executive board of SEDS India. The executive board of SEDS India consists of six board members who are selected through a voting process, with all individual members of SEDS India being eligible to vote. The Permanent Trustee of SEDS India is Geetha Manivasagam, Vellore Institute of Technology. The advisory panel has multiple dignitaries on its board, including the associate director of Vikram Sarabhai Space Center.

The main outreach program of SEDS India is called OneSpace. OneSpace was founded to spread awareness about and engagement with space among underprivileged children in rural India and children residing in local orphanages. Attempts have also been made by SEDS India to outreach to northeast India, where access to space education and technical projects is more difficult. These efforts were led with the help of Angaraj Duara, an alumnus of Maharishi Vidyamandir Shilpukhuri, Guwahati, and established seven chapters in Assam. They are the Army Public School Narangi, Sharla Birla Gyan Jyoti School Guwahati, IIT-Guwahati, Handique Girls College, Royal Global Institute - RSET Guwahati, Donbosco Public School Panbazar and Tezpur University. SEDS-APSN was the first chapter in northeast India. A separate SEDS-NorthEast governing body oversees activities in the northeast.

=== SEDS (Singapore) ===
SEDS (Singapore)
- Type: Non Profit Student Organization
- Region served: Singapore
- Key people: Yeoh Jun Kai; (President SEDS (SG)): Ian Wu Ling En; (President NUS SEDS): Kim Hyun Ji; (President SEDS-NTU): Joshua Ng Tze Wee; (President SEDS-SUTD)
- Website: http://seds-sg.space

SEDS (Singapore), founded in July 2019 by Vairavan Ramanathan and Nick Lee from National University of Singapore and the Nanyang Technological University respectively, is the first and only national space and entrepreneurial organization in Singapore. The goal of SEDS Singapore is to provide a platform for students of all backgrounds based in Singapore to actively participate in ushering in a new space age.

Currently, there are 3 SEDS chapters under SEDS (Singapore). NUS SEDS based in National University of Singapore. SEDS-NTU based in Nanyang Technological University. SEDS-SUTD based in Singapore University of Technology and Design.

Current Active Projects of SEDS (Singapore):

Project	Chapter
Mars Rover Challenge	SEDS-NUS
High Altitude Balloon	SEDS-NTU

=== SEDS Sri Lanka ===
SEDS Sri Lanka
- SEDS Sri Lanka Logo
- Founded: September 2018
- Founder: Amila Sandun Basnayaka and Thilan Harshana
- Type: Student Organization
- Purpose: "Bringing together students of many disciplines from all corners of the country to celebrate student shared passion for all things about space"
- Region served: Sri Lanka
- Members: 1000+
- Key people: Vishal Perera (Chairperson); Mahendri Hemachandra (Vice-Chairperson); Teena Fernando (Secretary); Oshani Rideevitage (Assistant Secretary); Chamodi Katulanda (Treasurer); Dilshan Perera (Chair of The Council)
- Website: https://sedssl.org

The most widespread astronomy related organization in Sri Lanka, SEDS Sri Lanka provides myriad opportunities to enthusiastic school children and university undergraduates alike. Founded in September 2018 by then graduate, Amila Sandun Basnayake and undergraduate, Thilan Harshana, currently the main organization SEDS Sri Lanka governs 16 chapters established under it. Hailing from a number of government and private universities, as well as a separate chapter for school children named SEDS Juniors, a wide range of activities are carried out throughout the year.

These opportunities are represented in many ways such as both onsite and online workshops, SEDS Space Talks, competitions and citizen scientist ventures and educational programs for juniors. Among these, it is of importance to note the first high altitude balloon launched by Sri Lanka, under the project SERENDIB 1.0, the Hackathon, NASA Space Apps conducted in collaboration with NASA, and the numerous asteroid hunts held in collaboration with Pan-STARRS.

SEDS Sri Lanka Chapters
SEDS SL Chapter	Affiliated University
SEDS Mora	University of Moratuwa
SEDS Pera	University of Peradeniya
SEDS Agni	South Eastern University of Sri Lanka
SEDS Kelaniya	University of Kelaniya
SEDS KDU	General Sir John Kotelawala Defence University
SEDS Sabra	University of Sabaragamuwa
SEDS SLIIT	SLIIT
SEDS Wayamba	Wayamba University of Sri Lanka
SEDS Yarl	University of Jaffna
SEDS OUSL	Open University of Sri Lanka
SEDS SLTC	Sri Lanka Technology Campus
SEDS Ruhuna	University of Ruhuna
SEDS Ocean	Ocean University of Sri Lanka
SEDS UOC	University of Colombo
SEDS NSBM	NSBM
SEDS J'pura	University of Sri Jayewardenepura
SEDS Juniors	School Students

=== SEDS Philippines ===
SEDS Philippines
- Founded: March 30, 2021
- Founder: Lovely Andeo (co-founders: Paul Kenneth Remo, Jonabel Eleanor Baldres, Karina Faith Amit, Gene Carlo Belinario, Angelika Nina Cabansag, Genesis Vertudez, Kris Kate Andoy)
- Type: Student Organization
- Region served: Philippines
- Key people: Mark Angelo Purio, Daryl Joe Santos, Gregorio Villar III (Advisors)
- Website: https://sedsph.vercel.app

SEDS Philippines (SEDSPH) is the official Philippine chapter of the Students for the Exploration and Development of Space or SEDS.

=== Macedonian SEDS ===
Macedonian Students for the Exploration and Development of Space (MK-SEDS / МК-СИРК) is the national and regional governing body for SEDS Chapters in Macedonia and Europe.

MK-SEDS initially started in 2019 as a self-organized and student-run Macedonian Cosmic Institute at the Ss. Cyril and Methodius University in Skopje on the initiative of few students. On October 18, 2020, students, alumni, alumnae and youth from Ss. Cyril and Methodius University of Skopje, Goce Delchev University of Shtip and St. Kliment Ohridski University of Bitola united in their intention to represent the force of Good, Beauty and Truth in the cosmic community of planet Earth adopted the Decision for registration of the Macedonian STUDENTS FOR THE EXPLORATION AND DEVELOPMENT OF SPACE.

The permanent Headquarters for MK-SEDS resides at the Faculty of Computer Science and Engineering, Ss. Cyril and Methodius University in Skopje.

=== SEDS Zimbabwe ===
Zimbabwe has multiple SEDS chapters at its major universities namely University of Zimbabwe, National University of Science and Technology, Midlands State University and Chinhoyi University of Technology. It also has a junior SEDS chapter that is aimed at introducing space education to students in high schools. In December 2021, SEDS MSU was one of the 10 teams in the world to be part of the Global Satellite Tracking Initiative where they were recipients of equipment to set up a ground station at Midlands State University.

== Notable student leaders ==
- Jeff Bezos, Princeton
- Eric C. Anderson, co-founder and Chairman of Virginia-based Space Adventures, Ltd., the first commercial spaceflight company—whilst enrolled as a student at the University of Virginia, he started a chapter of Students for the Exploration and Development of Space.

== See also ==
- Outer space
- Yuri's Night
- Space Frontier Foundation
- National Space Society
- The Planetary Society
- Mars Society
- NewSpace
- Peter Diamandis
- Robert D. Richards
- Todd B. Hawley
- German National Student Space Flight Society
