= Walter Peeters =

Belgian engineer and economist

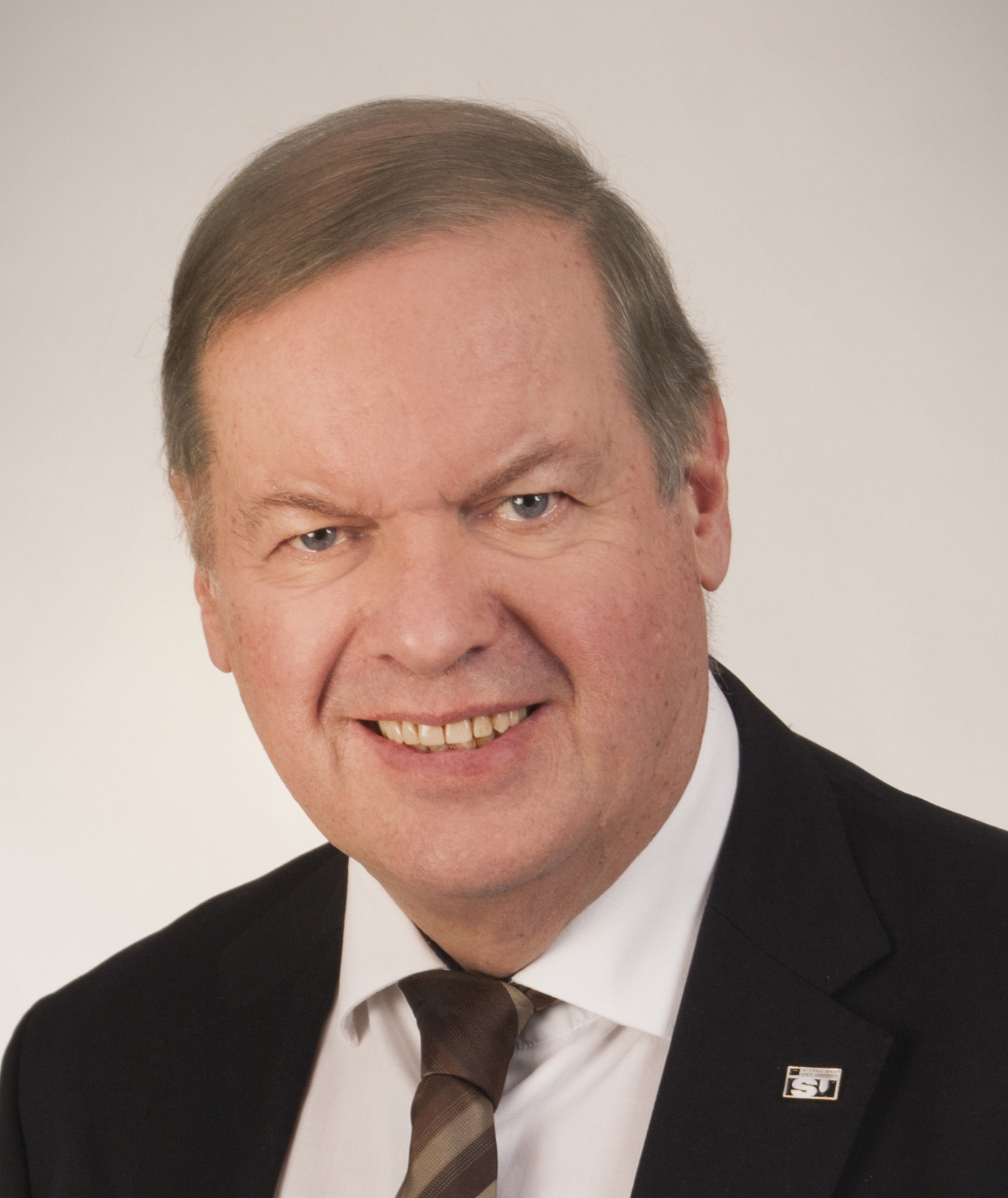
- Born: 28 June 1950 (age 76); Antwerp, Belgium
- Education: Technical University of Delft

Walter Peeters is a Belgian engineer, economist and professor. He became president of the International Space University in 2011.

== Early life and education ==
Peeters was born in Antwerp on 28 June 1950. He completed primary school in Ekeren at the St.-Lambertusinstituut, and subsequently attended the Royal Atheneum in Antwerp. He obtained an engineering degree in nuclear engineering, a degree in Applied Economics from the Catholic University of Louvain, and an MBA with a thesis on 'Fleet Size Scheduling' (Catholic University of Leuven, Belgium, 1982). Later, he received a doctorate in engineering at the Technical University of Delft, with a doctoral thesis entitled "The appropriate use of contract types in development contracts."

== Career ==
Peeters worked as engineer in the construction sector and in the petrochemical sector, specializing in the field of project planning. In 1983, he joined the European Space Agency (ESA) and was involved in several control and project management functions. Initial assignments were related to the extension of test facilities at ESA’s technology center ESTEC in Noordwijk before joining the Hermes project in Toulouse. After several redesign phases the mass of the Hermes spacecraft continued to increase as well as the estimated cost-to-completion; at the end the ESA Member States decided to terminate the project. Upon creation of the European Astronaut Center (EAC) in Cologne, he became Head of the astronaut coordination office and acted in Star City, by Moscow, as coordinator of the astronaut operations during the EUROMIR missions in 1994 and 1995. As far as academic activities are concerned, after a sabbatical year he published the book ‘Space Marketing’ in 2000 and joined the International Space University (ISU) as Professor in space business and management. In 2004 he was named as dean of the university, which was highly noted in the Belgian press, and since 2011 elected as president. Since October 2018 he has been nominated as President-Emeritus at ISU. Research activities are focused on the commercialization of space activities as well as the development of New Space activities. Specific attention is dedicated to the transition from experimental sub-orbital space tourism to commercial spaceflights, leading to a publication for the International Academy of Astronautics on sub-orbital space tourism. In 2009 he was elected as Founding Director of the International Institute of Space Commerce (IISC). Special interests include the role of space activities as a catalyst of international cooperation, as presented inter alia at Facing Tomorrow in Jerusalem. It also led him to propose in 2014 the International Space Station as a candidate for the Nobel Peace Prize; however, the geopolitical context (situation in Ukraine) at that time were not beneficial for this proposal. Recent emphases of Peeters includes consulting of governments such as the Baltic States (from 2011 onwards), Luxembourg (2017), South-Australia (2017) and Oman as well as assisting young space entrepreneurs in business plan development and start-up activities and research on sustainable space. He is working together closely with the local authorities to promote space activities in Alsace leading to the establishment of a successful space incubator at ISU in Stasbourg. In 2017 he was also involved in discussions in Ireland on the possible establishment of an Irish Space Agency Peeters is associated editor of the newSpace Journal and member of the editorial board of Astropolitics.

== Awards ==
- Full Member (Academician) of the International Academy of Astronautics (IAA) - Youri Gagarin Medal nr.186 in the year 2000; NASA Group Achievement Award
- Knight in Order of Merit (Légion d'Honneur) in France;
- Administrator of YouSpace.be (since 2024);

== Selected publications ==
- Peeters, W.A. and in ‘t Veld, J., The Use of Alternate Contract Types in Europe as Protection Against Overruns. National Contracts Management Journal, 23(1), pp. 23–34, 1989.
- Peeters, Walter A. R. (2000). Space Marketing. A European Perspective. Dordrecht, Boston: Kluwer Academic Publications. p. 9. ISBN 978-0-7923-6744-4.
- Peeters, W. Space Marketing (in Chinese) (Caphbook, Beijing, 2004) ISBN 7-80144-866-9. 376 p.
- Peeters W. ISS as a Nobel Prize Nominee? Why not? SpaceNews 25(7) (2014), p. 19,
- Peeters, W. and Madauss B. A proposed strategy against Cost Overruns in the space sector : the 5C approach. Journal of Space Policy 24(2), May 2008, pp. 80–89.
- Peeters, W. (2010). "From suborbital space tourism to commercial personal spaceflight". Acta Astronautica. 66 (11–12): 1625–1632. Bibcode:2010AcAau..66.1625P. doi:10.1016/j.actaastro.2009.10.026.
- Peeters, W. Space Science: A cradle for philosophers, Astropolitics, 10:27–38, 2012
- Peeters, W. Towards a definition of New Space? The entrepreneurial perspective. New Space, 6(3) (2018), pp. 187–190.
- Peeters, W., Damp, L. and Williams, P. (2020). "Launching Smallsats. The example of Southern launch". New Space. 8 (4): 201–212. Bibcode:2020NewSp...8..201P. doi:10.1089/space.2020.0034. S2CID 230547313.
- Peeters, W., Evolution of the Space Economy: Government Space to Commercial Space and New Space, Astropolitics, DOI: 10.1080/14777622.2021.1984001 (2022)
- Peeters, W., The Paradigm Shift of NewSpace: New Business Models and Growth of the Space Economy. NewSpace, Vol (12)3, https://doi.org/10.1089/space.2023.0060 (2024)
- Peeters, W. and Ehrenfreund, P.; Charting the Future of Space: A Collaborative Vision for Innovative Commercial Partnerships and Sustainable Space Exploration, New Space Vol 13(1), (March 2025), pp. 7-21. Available under https://www.liebertpub.com/doi/10.1089/space.2024.0041
- Peeters, W., (2025). New Space Business: An Opportunity for Emerging Space Nations. Businesses, 5(4), 50. https://doi.org/10.3390/businesses5040050
- Peeters, W. and Trur, A. (2026) The need for Cosmic Development Goals for space exploration. Front. Astron. Space Sci. 13:1836909. https://doi.org/10.3389/fspas.2026.1836909
