= Tomorrowland (book) =

2015 book by Steven Kotler

Tomorrowland: Our Journey from Science Fiction to Science Fact
- Cover for Tomorrowland
- Author: Steven Kotler
- Subject: popular science, emerging technologies
- Genre: Non-fiction
- Publisher: Amazon Publishing (Little A and New Harvest)
- Publication date: May 12, 2015
- Pages: 288
- ISBN: 978-0-544-45621-1

Tomorrowland: Our Journey from Science Fiction to Science Fact is a 2015 nonfiction book by science journalist Steven Kotler and published by Amazon Publishing.

== Content ==
The book is composed of a series of essay articles that were published by Kotler in various online news publications, including The New York Times, The Atlantic, and Discover. There are sixteen chapters made up of the same number of articles, each dealing with a different topic of technological innovation in a variety of fields.

== Critical reception ==
Kirkus Reviews praised Kotler for not just presenting the technological innovations themselves, but also focusing on the "obsessive people behind the science" and how his insight into their work encompasses a "range from humane and gripping stories of redemption to indifferent research scientists unsure if their developments will even make the world a better place". Library Journal reviewer Talea Anderson also noted the introduction of each essay and discussed technology focusing on "presenting the array of often quirky inventors and early adopters who have engaged with it" and ultimately recommended the book for readers of popular science. In a separate review in Library Journal of the audiobook, reviewer Lisa Youngblood recommended the book and its look at not only the technology, but also the "social and moral questions that arise" from the potential ramifications of the emerging technologies.

== See also ==
- Futurology
- Abundance: The Future Is Better Than You Think
- Bold: How to Go Big, Create Wealth, and Impact the World
