= Allan Carswell =

Canadian physicist (1933–2026)

Allan Ian Carswell, CM, FRSC (October 4, 1933 – March 29, 2026) was a Canadian physicist and researcher in the field of laser radar (lidar) applications. He was actively engaged in the study of the properties and applications of lasers and coherent optical frequency radiation since 1963.

== Life and career ==
Carswell was a member of the Plasma Physics Laboratory at the RCA Victor Research Laboratories in Montreal, Quebec, Canada, studying electromagnetic waves with ionized gas systems. In 1965, Carswell was appointed Director of the RCA Optical and Microwave Research Laboratory, and led the group there that developed the first CO_{2} laser in Canada and the first Canadian commercial HeNe laser.

He was a professor of physics at Toronto, Ontario, Canada's York University, where he conducted laser research. His work included the investigation of the properties and applications of high-power CO_{2}, nitrogen and dye lasers, and the application of laser scattering techniques for remote sensing and environmental diagnostics.

In 1974, Carswell founded Optech and led the company from its inception. He became chairman of the Board of Optech in 2000. Carswell founded Optech to develop the more practical applications of lidar systems, and the company has since grown to become a world leader in laser ranging applications. Optech now has over 200 employees and conducts 90% of its business internationally.

Carswell was a co-investigator on the Phoenix Mars Mission, launched in 2007, which will use lidar to measure dust particles in the air on Mars.

Carswell died on March 29, 2026, at the age of 92.

== Honours ==
Carswell was elected a Fellow of the Royal Society of Canada in 1984. In 2006 he was honoured with the John H. Chapman Award of Excellence by the Canadian Space Agency (CSA) for his significant achievements and lifelong dedication to space science and development in Canada. He became a Member of the Order of Canada in 2005.

The Allan I. Carswell Observatory is named after him.
