= Pineville High School (Louisiana) =

Public high school in Pineville, Louisiana, United States

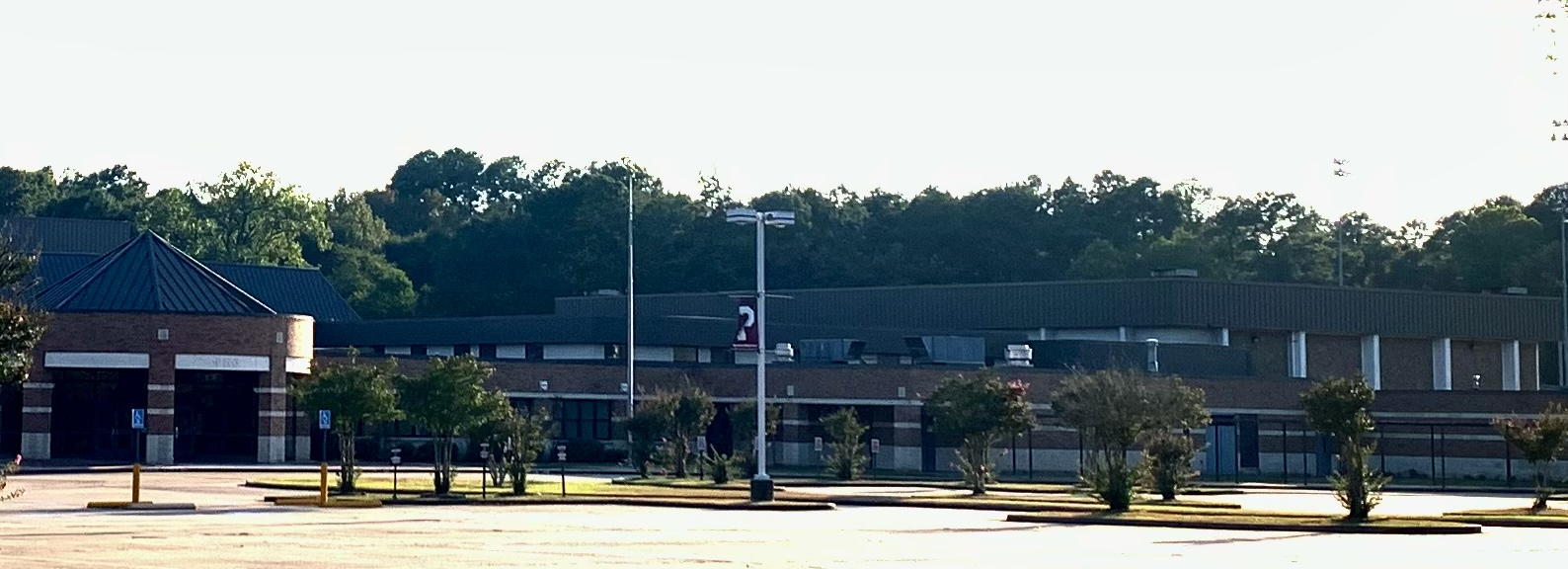
- Pineville High School in August 2023

Location
- 1511 Line St. Pineville, United States of America, Louisiana; United States; 31°20′05″N 92°25′57″W

Information
- Type: Public High School
- Founded: 1952
- School district: Rapides Parish School District
- Oversight: Rapides Parish School District
- Superintendent: Jeff Powell
- Principal: John Neal
- Head teacher: Aphra Bolyer
- Teaching staff: 81.82 (FTE)
- Grades: 9–12
- Enrollment: 1,319 (2023-2024)
- Student to teacher ratio: 16.12
- Colors: Cardinal and Gray
- Athletics: Yes
- Mascot: Rebel
- Nickname: Rebels
- Rival: Alexandria Sr High School
- Newspaper: “Yahoo!”
- Yearbook: Canon
- School hours: 7:20 AM to 2:30 PM
- Website: pinevillehigh.rpsb.us

Pineville High School (PHS) is a coeducational public high school located in Pineville, in Rapides Parish in central Louisiana, United States. The school opened in 1952.

== Profile ==
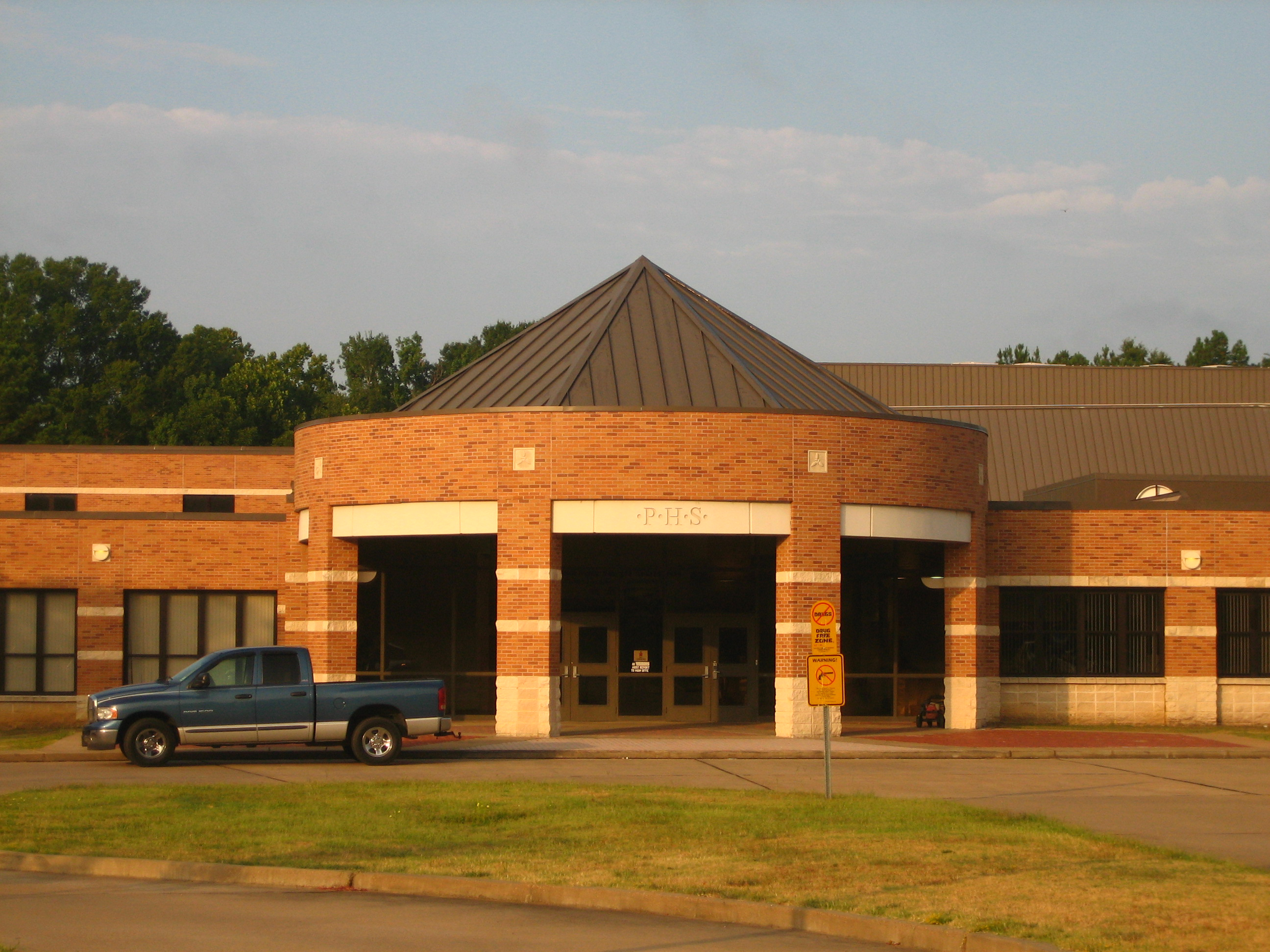
Entrance to newer section of Pineville High School

Pineville High School is the largest high school in Rapides Parish. The school's enrollment is approximately 1,500 students as of the 2018–2019 school year. The school has approximately one hundred faculty, staff, and administrators.

== Arts ==
The school is designated as a magnet center for the creative and performing arts, which hosts award-winning programs in theatre, visual arts, and musical performance. The PHS Theatre has performed musicals such as Legally Blonde, Rock of Ages, Chicago, Les Misérables, Footloose, Grease, Beauty and the Beast, Cats, Crazy for You, Oklahoma!, Pippin, and The Hunchback of Notre Dame, among others. The theatre department also won the 2020 Best of Cenla Readers Choice Award for their performance of Into the Woods (2019), and plans to perform Grease, Young Frankenstein, The Taming of the Shrew, Arsenic and Old Lace, West Side Story, and Matilda in its 2022–23 season. The members of the Pineville High School choral program consistently qualify for the Louisiana Music Educator's Association (LMEA) All-State Choir. The Pineville High School Band competes in marching band competitions across the state of Louisiana, and regularly scores superior ratings at each. The orchestra performs annual Christmas and spring concerts, and the theatre program performs various musicals and plays year-round.

== Academics ==
The curriculum includes gifted, honors, and regular level courses. Many students leave Pineville with multiple academic honors, scholarships, and credentials to prepare them to succeed in the next chapter of their journey. Special education programs cater to students who are multi-handicapped or learning disabled. Academically, the school has the highest school performance score of any school in Rapides Parish. Students are also given the chance to earn college credits through Northwestern State University in Natchitoches, LA.

== Athletics ==
Pineville High athletics competes in the LHSAA.

Athletic teams include football, baseball, basketball, soccer, golf, tennis, track and field, powerlifting, swimming, cross country, and softball. The school was re-designated 5-A during the 2006–2007 school year.

=== Championships ===
Football Championships

- (1) State Championship: 1960

‘’’Basketball Championships’’’

- (1) State Championship: 1990

== Mascot ==
The mascot for Pineville High School is the Rebels. The Confederate Rebel General, a copy of the former Ole Miss Colonel Reb, was removed in September 2020 after a decision in regard to a petition aimed to change the mascot following protests over the murder of George Floyd. The current logos include the Pineville "P" and "Rebels" in Brush ATF script.

== Clubs ==
Pineville High has several student clubs, including the National Honors Society, Chess Club, Future Business Leaders of America, 4-H, Key Club, Educators Rising, Quiz Bowl, Bass Club, Club Kid, Student Council, and Ukulele Club.

== Notable alumni ==
- Cody Ford, football player
- Faith Ford, actress
- Justin Gaston, commercial actor, musician, model
- Jay F. Honeycutt, former director of the Kennedy Space Center
- Jay Luneau, Alexandria lawyer and state senator
- Kenny Mixon, former football player
