= The Dressmaker of Khair Khana =

2011 book by Gayle Tzemach Lemmon

- Editor: Julia Cheiffetz
- Author: Gayle Tzemach Lemmon
- Subject: Kamila Sidiqi
- Genre: Non-fiction
- Publisher: HarperCollins
- Publication date: March 2011

The Dressmaker of Khair Khana is a book by author Gayle Tzemach Lemmon, published in March 2011 by HarperCollins. It documents the story of Kamila Sidiqi, a young female entrepreneur working during the years of Taliban rule in Afghanistan, a time when the rights of women were severely restricted. Dressmaker is the first book by Lemmon, who serves as deputy director of the Council on Foreign Relations' Women and Foreign Policy program. Her work has appeared in the New York Times, the Financial Times, and The Christian Science Monitor, amongst other publications.

The Dressmaker of Khair Khana is a New York Times Bestseller. The book was edited by Julia Cheiffetz and was acquired by Lisa Sharkey.

== Origins ==
In the winter of 2005, Lemmon traveled to Afghanistan as part of a case study she was completing for her MBA at Harvard University. She was studying women entrepreneurs, particularly those in conflict zones. She sought to change the narrative from “victim” to “survivor.” Given the tone of caution in Afghanistan, it was at first difficult to locate a viable subject. However, a contact referred Lemmon to Kamila Sidiqi and her family. Lemmon met with them and their associates over several subsequent trips to Afghanistan.

== Plot summary ==
The story begins in 1996 on the day that Kamila graduates with her teaching certificate, and the day the Taliban first arrive in Kabul, capital of Afghanistan and home to the Sidiqi family. Inspired by the sharia law of Islam, it would become the doctrine of the Taliban to completely isolate women from society. Women were not permitted to work, attend school, or even leave the house without a male relative, or mahram. Kamila’s father and brothers do not escape persecution either, and are soon forced to flee the city. Unable to teach and desperate to support her family, Kamila masters the art of dressmaking and passes on the skills to her younger sisters. In order to find work for the budding business, Kamila frequently makes the dangerous trek to the market and meets with the owners of local dress shops. Soon the business is growing, and Kamila sees an opportunity to help other women in her community. With the help of her sisters, she opens a tailoring school in their home to teach women how to sew and to give them work once they completed their training. At a time of almost insurmountable poverty, she is able to employ nearly one hundred of her friends and neighbors, all the while escaping the scrutiny of the Taliban.

== Critical reception ==
The Dressmaker of Khair Khana has been reviewed by magazines, journals, and blogs including the Huffington Post, Christian Science Monitor, and the Los Angeles Times. People Magazine has called Dressmaker "a fascinating window on Afghan life under the Taliban and a celebration of women the world over who support their loved ones with tenacity, inventiveness, and sheer guts." The Huffington Post noted, "The Dressmaker of Khair Khana is a book to be shared across genders and generations, a truly uplifting and very true story of how one woman set out to start a business and ended up preserving the dignity of so many women." Angelina Jolie, Greg Mortenson, Mohamed El-Erian, and Daily Beast Editor-in-Chief Tina Brown wrote the reviews for Dressmaker's book sleeve.
