= Jay F. Honeycutt =

American engineer

- Born: 7 May 1937 (age 89); Jena, La Salle Parish, Louisiana, US
- Education: Pineville High School (Louisiana), University of Louisiana at Lafayette
- Spouse(s): Peggy Honeycutt, four children

Jay F. Honeycutt (born 7 May 1937) is an American engineer. He served as the director of NASA's John F. Kennedy Space Center from 1995 to 1997.

== Early life and education ==
Honeycutt was born in Jena in La Salle Parish in North Louisiana.

He graduated in 1955 from Pineville High School in Pineville in Rapides Parish in Central Louisiana. He obtained a Bachelor of Science in electrical engineering from the University of Louisiana at Lafayette, then known as the University of Southwestern Louisiana in Lafayette.

Honeycutt began his Government career at Redstone Arsenal in Huntsville, Alabama, as an engineer in 1960.

== NASA ==
He began his NASA career at the Johnson Space Center (JSC), Houston, Texas, in 1966 as an engineer in Flight Operations for the Apollo Program. Honeycutt subsequently served in several key positions in Flight Operations until 1988.

In 1981 Honeycutt served as technical assistant to the associate administrator for the Space Transportation System, NASA Headquarters. From 1982 to 1986, he served in management positions in the Space Shuttle Program Office at Johnson Space Center.

From 1986-1987, he was special assistant to the NASA Associate Administrator for Space Flight, and coordinated Presidential Commission and Congressional activities relative to the Challenger accident.

From 1987 to 1989, Honeycutt served at NASA Headquarters as deputy manager, NSTS Program Office.

From 1989 to 1995, he was the director of Shuttle Management and Operations at the Kennedy Space Center. He was appointed director of the Kennedy Space Center, effective January 22, 1995, succeededing Robert L. Crippen. In this role Honeycutt was responsible for engineering management and technical direction of pre-flight, launch, landing and recovery activities for Space Shuttle vehicles. Honeycutt left this position on March 2, 1997 and was succeeded as KSC Director by Roy D. Bridges, Jr.

== Private sector ==
After leaving NASA, Honeycutt was president of Lockheed Martin Space Operations from 1997 to 2004.

On 22 September 2008, he joined Odyssey Moon where he was named president and was responsible for all programs and commercial launch operations.

== Awards ==
Among the significant NASA awards Honeycutt has earned are:

- Exceptional Service Medal (1974, 1988)
- Special Achievement Award (1978, 1982)
- Outstanding Leadership Medal (1988, 1995)
- Equal Employment Opportunity Award (1993)
- Meritorious Executive Presidential Rank Award (1993)

== Personal life ==
Honeycutt and his wife Peggy live in Cocoa Beach, Florida; they have four children: Barry Honeycutt, Jeff Honeycutt, Delise Del Favero, and Daniel Del Favero.

== See also ==
- Odyssey Moon
