= Robert D. Richards =

Canadian-born space entrepreneur

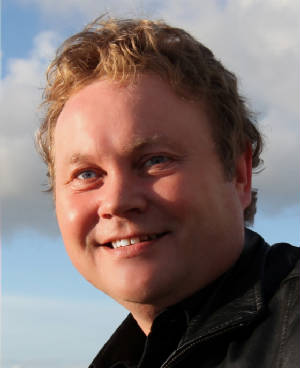
- Robert (Bob) Richards
- Born: Toronto, Ontario, Canada
- Education: Ryerson University (now Toronto Metropolitan University), University of Toronto and Cornell University
- Occupation: Entrepreneur
- Known for: Private spaceflight industry
- Scientific career
- Institutions: Moon Express

Robert D. Richards is a Canadian-born space entrepreneur. He is co-founder and CEO of Moon Express, Inc., a U.S. company partnered with NASA and developing robotic spacecraft to provide low cost access to the Moon for science, exploration and commerce. He is also the founder and former CEO of Odyssey Moon Limited, an Isle of Man based commercial lunar enterprise and the first official contender in the $30M Google Lunar X PRIZE competition. From 2002-2009 he was the founding Director of the Space Division at Optech Incorporated, providing advanced lidar systems for spacecraft operations and planetary exploration, including NASA's Mars Phoenix Lander and OSIRIS-REx missions.

In 1987 Robert Richards founded the International Space University (ISU) together with Todd B. Hawley and Peter Diamandis and he served as the university's first Associate Administrator for Strategic Planning. He chaired the board's administrative and strategic planning committees during ISU's first phase of development. In 2005 Robert Richards received a Doctorate of Space Achievement (honoris causa) from the International Space University for "distinguished accomplishments in support of humanity's exploration and use of space."

Robert Richards co-founded the Students for the Exploration and Development of Space (SEDS) as a student together with Todd B. Hawley and Peter Diamandis in the 1980s. After coining the term "Space Generation", symbolizing a common bond among people born since the beginning of the space age, Robert Richards also co-founded the Space Generation Foundation with Hawley and Diamandis, now succeeded by the Space Generation Advisory Council.

In 2008 Robert Richards joined Peter Diamandis, Ray Kurzweil and others in the founding of Singularity University, an institution based at the NASA Research Park in Silicon Valley, California, focused on graduate and executive level education about exponentially advancing technologies. Robert Richards remains an active supporter of these organizations.
