= Odyssey Moon =

Google Lunar X Prize team

On 6 December 2007, Odyssey Moon was the first team to register for the Google Lunar X Prize competition, an event that hopes to rekindle the efforts of humans to return to the Moon. The competition is referred to as "Moon 2.0" and is composed of other private organizations like Odyssey Moon Limited, the commercial lunar enterprise that makes up this team. Each team will be competing for a $20 million first prize, a $5 million second prize, and additional $5 million in (potential) bonuses.

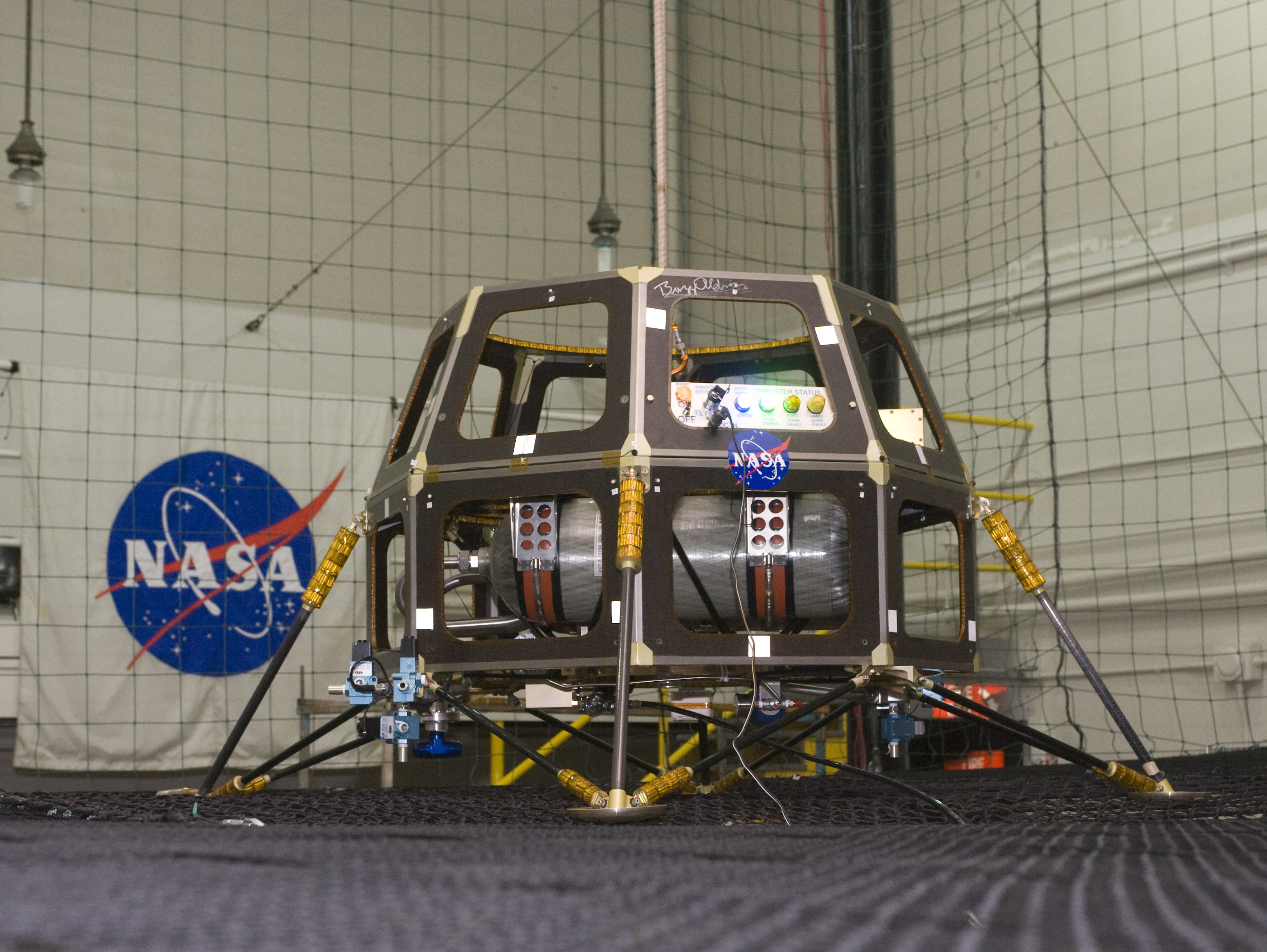
Odyssey Moon will utilize the basic design of this NASA hover test vehicle.

== History ==
Odyssey Moon Limited is based on the Isle of Man, and is the design of Robert D. Richards. His goals include developing the first commercial enterprise that utilizes the energy and resources on the Moon. To achieve this end, the team enlisted the part-time consultant services of Alan Stern, NASA's former top-rank planetary scientist. On 22 September 2008, another veteran of NASA joined Odyssey Moon. Jay F. Honeycutt was named president and was to be responsible for all programs and commercial launch operations. He brought much expertise in managing large scale engineering operations. His experience at NASA was diverse. He was director of the Kennedy Space Center for several years and was director of Shuttle Management and Operations for more than five years. Outside NASA, another part of his forty years of professional experience was as president of Lockheed Martin Space Operations from 1997-2004.

The team's goals are to build and deploy a robotic lander that will deliver exploration as well as scientific payloads to the Moon. The new lander/spacecraft has been dubbed "MoonOne (M-1)". These efforts have been contracted to MacDonald Dettwiler, a Canadian corporation with a successful history of providing technical space solutions for several NASA projects including the Space Shuttle and the International Space Station.

The Planetary Society, an international space interest group co-founded by Carl Sagan, joined Odyssey Moon's efforts in 2007, specifically with public outreach and coordination between public and private organizations.

Colin Pillinger, a scientist with a background in studying meteorites, led the European Space Agency's failed Beagle 2 Mars lander project in 2003. In 2009 he was in discussion with Odyssey Moon regarding the use of an identical version of Beagle's most powerful instrument on their lander.

== See also ==
- Peter Diamandis
- Private spaceflight
