= Gayle Tzemach Lemmon =

American author

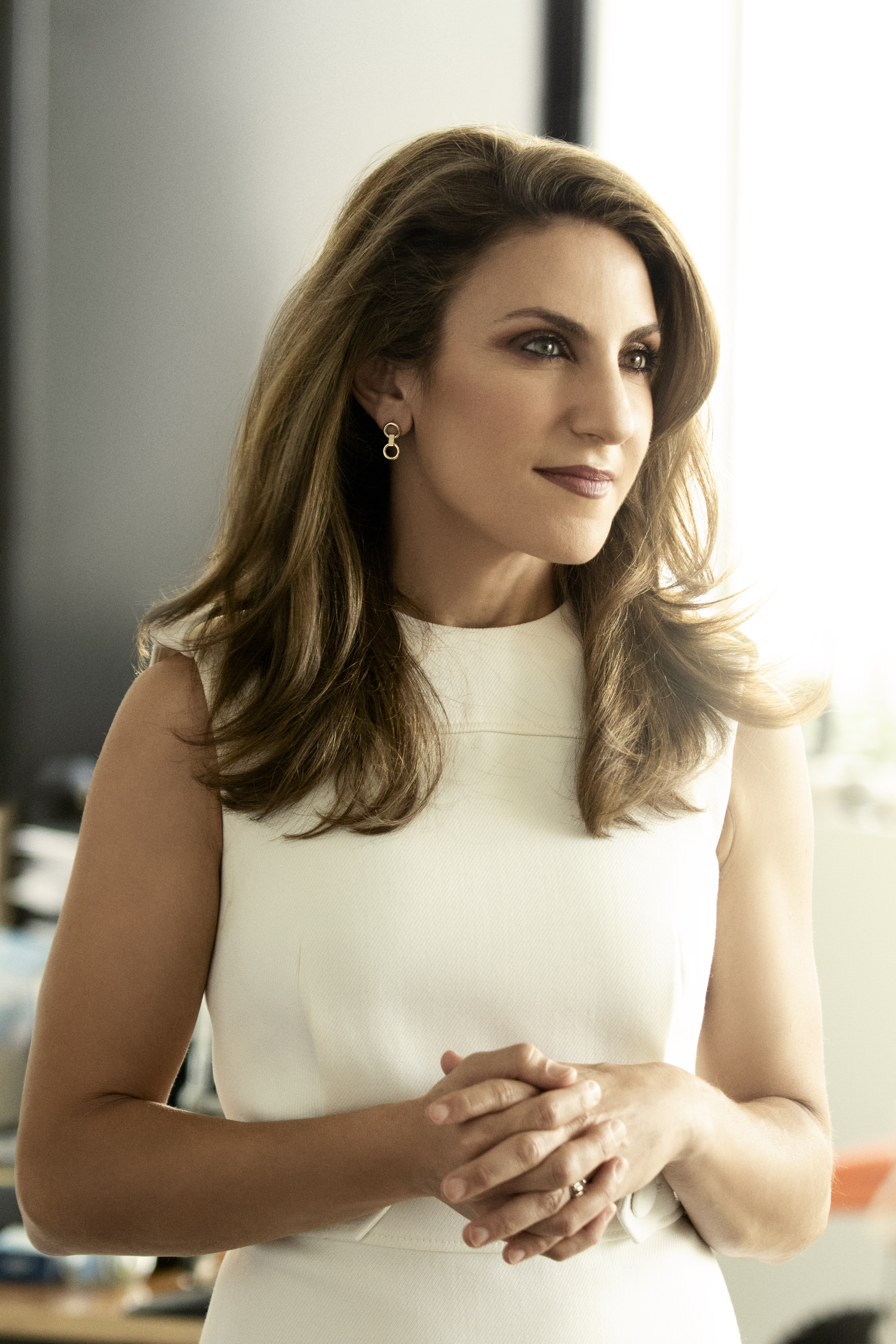
- Lemmon in 2020
- Born: Yael Tzemach; September 7, 1973 (age 52); Greenbelt, Maryland, U.S.
- Education: B.A. University of Missouri; M.B.A. Harvard Business School
- Occupations: Author, executive, adjunct senior fellow at the Council on Foreign Relations, producer, journalist
- Parent: Rhoda Miriam Spielman Tzemach
- Family: Frances Cohen Spielman (grandmother)
- Awards: HBS 2006 Dean’s Award

Gayle Tzemach Lemmon (born 7 September 1973) is an American author who has written on the role of women and girls in foreign policy. She has held private sector roles in emerging technology for national security as well as financial services. She serves as an adjunct senior fellow at the Women and Foreign Policy Program with the Council on Foreign Relations and has written the New York Times bestsellers The Dressmaker of Khair Khana (2011), Ashley’s War: The Untold Story of a Team of Women Soldiers on the Special Ops Battlefield (2015) and The Daughters of Kobani: A Story of Rebellion, Courage, and Justice (2021). A graduate of the University of Missouri and the Harvard Business School, Lemmon has covered a variety of topics such as women's entrepreneurship, women in the military, forced and child marriage, Syria and Afghanistan. She has also served as a board member of the Mercy Corps and the International Center for Research on Women, and as a member of the Bretton Woods Committee. She speaks Spanish, German, French and is conversant in Dari and basic Kurmanji.

== Education and early career ==
Born to a Jewish family, the daughter of an Iraqi father and Rhoda Miriam Spielman Tzemach (died 1987). Her mother raised her as a single parent in Greenbelt, Maryland, her grandmother was Frances Cohen Spielman (died 1999), a World War II veteran of Women's Army Corps and an independent film distributor during the 1940s who later founded First Run Features. Her paternal family comes from Iraq, partly from Iraqi Kurdistan. Her father was born in Baghdad but was forced to leave the country as a child due to his religion.

Lemmon earned a BA in journalism summa cum laude from the University of Missouri School of Journalism. From 1997 to 2004, she worked in the ABC News Political Unit, where she covered presidential politics and public policy issues, and served as producer in the first year of This Week with George Stephanopoulos. During that time, she visited Spain as a Fulbright Scholar and Germany as a Robert Bosch Fellow.

In 2004, Lemmon started MBA study at Harvard. During the study, she began writing about women's entrepreneurship in conflict and post-conflict zones, traveling to Rwanda and Afghanistan. Lemmon graduated with an MBA two years later, and received the HBS 2006 Dean's Award for her work on the subject. She then continued working on women's entrepreneurship in the world, covering more countries such as Bosnia and Liberia.

From 2006 to 2010, she worked in the executive office and in emerging markets at the global investment firm PIMCO, leading public policy analysis. During the time, she consulted for the World Bank and co-authored a 2008 report Doing Business: Women in Africa. In 2010, she was featured on the cover of the HBS alumni magazine for her work on entrepreneurs in conflict and post-conflict zones.

== Writing and public speaking career ==
In 2011, Lemmon wrote the first Tina Brown Newsweek cover article, featuring an interview with Hillary Clinton on former Secretary of State's push to put women at the center of U.S. foreign policy. The same year, her book, The Dressmaker of Khair Khana, was published by HarperCollins. The story about Kamila Sidiqi, a young Afghan entrepreneur who supports her community under the Taliban rule, was the New York Times nonfiction bestseller. In December 2011, she gave the opening talk at TEDxWomen, in which she described why investing in women can make the difference for the global economy.

She is also the author of Entrepreneurship in Postconflict Zones, a 2012 CFR working paper that argues for comprehensive, long-term, collaborative approaches to help entrepreneurs in conflict and post-conflict countries overcome challenges in accessing capital, markets, networks, and business skills training. The same year, she began writing a number of pieces on women and girls for The Atlantic, including We Need to Tell Girls They Can Have It All (Even If They Can't), which was mentioned in Sheryl Sandberg's 2013 book Lean In: Women, Work, and The Will to Lead, and on the lessons she learned growing up in a community of single mothers.

In October 2013, Lemmon broke the first media story about how the military could not pay death benefits to fallen soldiers killed in action during the government shutdown. The story attracted the attention of the Pentagon and the White House, and Fisher House eventually stepped in to fill the funding gap until the shutdown ended. In December of the same year, she published a policy innovation memorandum, titled Banking on Growth, making the case for why the United States should support the creation of an American development bank to invest in small and medium-businesses in the world's toughest economies.

In 2014, she authored two CFR working papers on the topic: High Stakes for Young Lives, coauthored with Lynn ElHarake, surveys strategies to stop child marriage; and Fragile States, Fragile Lives that examines the correlation between child marriage and state fragility. This work culminated in a CFR e-book publication Child Brides, Global Consequences: How to End Child Marriage. In September the next year, Lemmon reported on the issue of child and forced marriage in the United States for the PBS NewsHour in a two-part series.

Her next book, Ashley's War: The Untold Story of a Team of Women Soldiers on the Special Ops Battlefield, was published by HarperCollins in 2015. It tells the story of CST-2, a unit of women handpicked from across the U.S. army to serve on combat operations alongside Army Rangers and Navy SEALs in Afghanistan, and of the remarkable hero at its heart: First Lieutenant Ashley White. The book, Lemmon's second New York Times bestseller, is being made into a film by Reese Witherspoon and Bruna Papandrea, with Lesli Linka Glatter and Molly Smith Metzler attached to direct and write it respectively. Lemmon also gave a TED Talk on Ashley's War at TEDWomen 2015, receiving more than one million views.

In 2021, Penguin Press published The Daughters of Kobani, the latest book authored by Lemmon. It is about a group of Syrian Kurdish women fighting against ISIS. According to Kirkus Reviews, it is "a well-told story of contemporary female warriors and the complex geopolitical realities behind their battles." The story, being another New York Times bestseller, has been optioned by HiddenLight Productions for TV.

Throughout her career, Lemmon has written on women's entrepreneurship and women in the military, forced and child marriage, girls’ ambition and single mothers, along with the role of women and girls in conflict for a variety of news outlets, including The New York Times, Financial Times, Foreign Policy, Ms. Magazine, among others. Lemmon has given talks at the Aspen Security Forum, TED forums, Clinton Global Initiative, West Point, the National Infantry Museum, and so on.

== Works ==
- The Dressmaker of Khair Khana: Five Sisters, One Remarkable Family, and the Woman Who Risked Everything to Keep Them Safe. HarperCollins. 15 March 2011. ISBN 978-0-06-173237-9.
- Gayle Tzemach Lemmon; Lynn S. ElHarake (1 July 2014). Child Brides, Global Consequences: How to End Child Marriage. Council on Foreign Relations. ISBN 978-0-87609-591-1.
- Ashley's War: The Untold Story of a Team of Women Soldiers on the Special Ops Battlefield. HarperCollins. 21 April 2015. ISBN 978-0-06233-383-4.
- The Daughters of Kobani: A Story of Rebellion, Courage, and Justice. Penguin Press. 16 February 2021. ISBN 9780525560685.
