= Abundance: The Future Is Better Than You Think =

2012 book by Peter H. Diamandis and Steven Kotler

- First edition
- Author: Peter H. Diamandis and Steven Kotler
- Audio read by: Arthur Morey (Audible)
- Subject: Technological innovation
- Genre: Non-fiction
- Publisher: Free Press, Tantor Audio
- Publication date: February 21, 2012; March 28, 2012 (Audible)
- Publication place: United States
- Media type: Print (hardcover), audiobook (Audible)
- Pages: 386 pp. (first edition), 10 hrs and 22 mins (Audible)
- ISBN: 9781451614213
- OCLC: 741542469
- LC Class: T173.8

Abundance: The Future Is Better Than You Think is a non-fiction book on advancing the human condition authored by Peter H. Diamandis and Steven Kotler that was published in 2012. Diamandis is otherwise primarily known for founding the X Prize Foundation, a nonprofit effort based around scientific competitions, and Kotler is otherwise known both as a journalist and as a writer of previous works.

The writers refer to the work's title as signifying a future in which nine billion people have access to clean water, food, energy, health care, housing, education, and everything else that is necessary for a fully meaningful standard of living, this occurring due to rapid developments in technological innovation causing economic progress during the decades of the 2010s and 2020s.

Critical praise came from the U.S. publications Christian Science Monitor and Time.

== Reviews and commentary ==
Bryan Walsh of Time said the book's message is that the future will be better than we think, even with all the bad news. He mentioned that despite the constant negative information, a closer look at the numbers shows that things are better than we believe.

Kate Wiede of the Christian Science Monitor published a praising review that remarked the authors had written "a book that values your intelligence by being honest and shooting straight."

Keenan Mayo of the San Francisco Chronicle said that the book's authors "argue forcefully against two prevailing notions: that the world's resources are being depleted too rapidly, and that the gap between the rich and the poor is widening beyond repair. They cite the rise of do-it-yourself innovation, fabulously rich 'technophilanthropists' who intend to use their deep pockets to change the world, and what they've termed the 'rising billion': the world's poor, who, thanks to modern communication technology, now have a voice."

Cristopher Schoppa of The Washington Post said the book is, "a heavy dose of optimism" and praised the authors for making "a persuasive case that mankind’s future may not be as bleak as we fear".

Matt Ridley of the Wall St. Journal wrote, "Diamandis and Kotler think that individual innovators can and will make huge differences to human living standards."

== See also ==
- 2012 in literature
- Futurology
- Technological innovation
- Tomorrowland: Our Journey from Science Fiction to Science Fact
