= Steven Kotler =

American author, journalist and entrepreneur

- Born: May 25, 1967 (age 59); Chicago, Illinois, U.S.
- Occupations: Author, entrepreneur, founder of the flow research collective
- Writing career
- Genre: non-fiction
- Notable works: The Art of the Impossible; The Rise of Superman; Abundance; A Small Furry Prayer; West of Jesus; Bold; Stealing Fire

Steven Kotler is an American author, journalist and entrepreneur. He is best known for his nonfiction books, including Abundance, A Small Furry Prayer, West of Jesus, Bold, The Rise of Superman and Stealing Fire.

== Early life and education ==
Kotler was born in Chicago, Illinois, to a Jewish family. After attending Orange High School in Cleveland, Ohio, he graduated from the University of Wisconsin, Madison in 1989 with degrees in English and creative writing. In 1993, he received an MA in creative writing from Johns Hopkins University.

== Career ==
Kotler's books and articles often deal with the intersection of science and culture, and make frequent and extended use of academic work, particularly in the areas of neuroscience, evolutionary theory, ethology, psychopharmacology and psychology. He has written seven nonfiction books — Stealing Fire, Tomorrowland, Bold, The Rise of Superman, Abundance, A Small Furry Prayer and West of Jesus — and two novels, The Angle Quickest for Flight and Last Tango in Cyberspace.

=== A Small Furry Prayer ===
In 2007, alongside his wife, Joy Nicholson, Kotler co-founded the Rancho de Chihuahua dog sanctuary in Chimayo, New Mexico. Rancho de Chihuahua specializes in hospice care and long term rehabilitation for special-needs dogs. Kotler's experience with Rancho de Chihuahua inspired his 2010 book, A Small Furry Prayer: Dog Rescue and the Meaning of Life.

A Small Furry Prayer was a Wall Street Journal and SF Chronicle bestseller.

=== Abundance ===
In 2012 Kotler published Abundance: The Future Is Better Than You Think with Peter Diamandis. The book revolves around the idea that the world is getting better and in the future most people of the world will have access to clean water, food, energy, health care, education, and everything else that is necessary for a first world standard of living, thanks to technological innovation. The authors argue progress in artificial intelligence, robotics, infinite computing, ubiquitous broadband networks, digital manufacturing, nanomaterials, synthetic biology, and many other growing technologies will enable the human race to make greater gains in the following two decades than in the previous two hundred years. By doing so, the authors suggest humans will have the ability to meet and exceed the basic needs of every man, woman, and child on the planet.

Abundance debuted at No. 1 on both Amazon.com and Barnes & Noble's bestseller lists, and at No. 2 on The New York Times bestseller list. It remained on the NYT bestseller list for nine weeks. Abundance was voted one of the "Top 5 Must Read Business Books of the Year" by Fortune.

=== The Rise of Superman ===
In 2014, Kotler announced The Rise of Superman: Decoding the Science of Ultimate Human Performance. The book explores the state of consciousness known as "flow", an optimal state in which humans perform and feel their best. The book includes examples from adventure athletes including big wave surfer Laird Hamilton, skater Danny Way and big mountain snowboarders Travis Rice and Jeremy Jones. The Rise of Superman examines how extreme athletes are accelerating their flow states to perform better and how people can use the same tactics to accelerate performance in everyday tasks.

=== Bold ===
In February 2015, Kotler published Bold: How to Go Big, Create Wealth, and Impact the World, his second book with Peter Diamandis. The book discusses the exponential advancement of technology and teaches entrepreneurs how to thrive in such an environment by being nimble and resilient. Bold debuted on The New York Times bestseller list and remained on the list for six weeks, reaching No. 6 overall. It was named one of the top 25 books read by corporate America in 2015.

=== Stealing Fire ===
Kotler, alongside Jamie Wheal, co-authored Stealing Fire, which brings to light a trillion-dollar economy that has gone unnoticed and unnamed for centuries. The book introduces real-life examples of "flow states" and the neuroscience that all humans are gifted with to unlock our hidden potential. The authors discuss how "ecstatis" is applied in every industry, the evolution of its research and how it is revolutionizing our world.

== Bibliography ==
=== Nonfiction ===
- West of Jesus: Surfing, Science and the Origin of Belief, 2006
- A Small, Furry Prayer: Dog Rescue and the Meaning of Life, 2010
- Abundance: The Future Is Better Than You Think, 2012, co-authored with Peter H. Diamandis
- The Rise of Superman: Decoding the Science of Ultimate Human Performance, 2014
- Bold: How to Go Big, Create Wealth, and Impact the World, 2015, co-authored with Peter H. Diamandis
- Tomorrowland: Our Journey from Science Fiction to Science Fact, 2015
- Stealing Fire: How Silicon Valley, the Navy SEALs, and Maverick Scientists Are Revolutionizing the Way We Live and Work, co-authored with Jamie Wheal, 2017
- The Art of Impossible: A Peak Performance Primer, 2021

=== Novels ===
- The Angle Quickest for Flight, 1999
- Last Tango in Cyberspace, 2019
- The Devil's Dictionary, 2022
