= Nathan Rempel =

Canadian ice hockey player

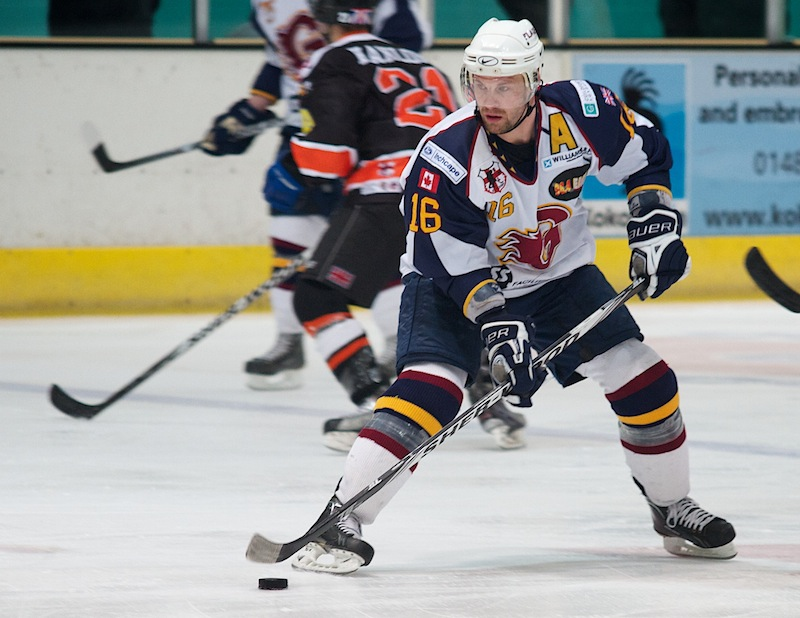
- Born: February 7, 1977 (age 49) Winnipeg, Manitoba, Canada
- Height: 5 ft 11 in (180 cm)
- Weight: 195 lb (88 kg; 13 st 13 lb)
- Position: Left wing
- Shoots: Right
- EPIHL team: Guildford Flames
- Playing career: 1993–present

Nathan Rempel (born February 7, 1977) is a retired Semi professional ice hockey player, Rempel was born in Winnipeg, Manitoba, Canada.

== Career ==
Rempel left on 27 April 2009 the Peterborough Phantoms and signed for the up-coming season with Guildford Flames.

== Privates ==
He holds the British passport.

== Career statistics ==
Season	Team	                Lge	GP	G	A	Pts	PIM	GP	G	A	Pts	PIM
1994-95 Saskatoon Blades 	WHL 	61 	6 	5 	11 	94 	10 	1 	0 	1 	11
1995-96 Saskatoon Blades 	WHL 	59 	15 	11 	26 	65 	4 	1 	0 	1 	4
1996-97 Saskatoon Blades 	WHL 	65 	18 	24 	42 	161 	--	--	--	--	--
1997-98 Saskatoon Blades 	WHL 	62 	21 	28 	49 	123 	6 	1 	5 	6 	18
1998-99 Peterborough Pirates 	BNL 	20 	26 	19 	45 	85 	6 	1 	2 	3 	16
1999-00 Canadian National Team 	Intl 	23 	2 	6 	8 	61 					
2000-01 Manitoba Moose 	        IHL 	12 	0 	1 	1 	19 	--	--	--	--	--
2000-01 Florida Everblades 	ECHL 	8 	0 	1 	1 	9 	--	--	--	--	--
2000-01 Greensboro Generals 	ECHL 	22 	2 	2 	4 	31 	--	--	--	--	--
2001-02 Louisiana IceGators 	ECHL 	60 	7 	10 	17 	99 	5 	1 	0 	1 	0
2002-03 Louisiana IceGators 	ECHL 	67 	25 	28 	53 	150 	5 	4 	0 	4 	2
2003-04 Bracknell Bees 	        BNL 	35 	28 	21 	49 	28 					
2004-05 Cardiff Devils 	        EIHL 	62 	24 	28 	52 	56 					
2005-06 London Racers 	        EIHL 	23 	9 	8 	17 	24 	--	--	--	--	--
2005-06 Cardiff Devils 	        EIHL 	29 	13 	12 	25 	43 	--	--	--	--	--
2006-07 Cardiff Devils 	        EIHL 	52 	16 	21 	37 	35 					
2006-07 Team Great Britain      WC1B     5       3       0       3       2
2007-08 Peterborough Phantoms   EPL     40      30      34      64      83      22      19      23      42      12
2008-09 Peterborough Phantoms   EPL     54      54      49      103     22
2009-10 Guildford Flames        EPL     55      40      28      68      46
2010-11 Guildford Flames        EPL     56      59      33      92      32       4      4       4       8       00  
Junior Totals                           247     60      68      128     443     20      3       5       8       33
Britain Pro Totals                      370     240     220     460     422     32      24      29      53      28
North America Pro Totals                169     34      42      76      308     10      5       0       5       2

All Levels                              870     398     369     767     1268    60      30      33      63      63
