= Kamila Sidiqi =

Afghan entrepenuer and government official

Kamila Sidiqi is an Afghan entrepreneur, government official, and the subject of the New York Times bestselling book, The Dressmaker of Khair Khana.

== Background ==
Sidiqi received her teaching certificate the same day the Taliban arrived in Kabul, rendering her unable to work. Without any means of supporting her family, the then 19-year-old turned to dressmaking. With the help of her sisters, she opened a tailoring school in their home to teach women to sew and provide employment after their training was completed. The venture went on to employ over 100 of Sidiqi's neighbours without attracting the Taliban's attention.

== Career ==
In 2004, following the fall of the Taliban, Sidiqi set up Kaweyan Business Development Services to bring business, leadership, and entrepreneurial skills to women and men in remote rural communities and cities. In her role as CEO, Sidiqi travelled across a country where few women could venture without a male relative to escort them, and where aid workers often travel with armed guards or local police. Kaweyan BDS was Afghanistan's first business development training company. It trained 5,000 people (70 percent of them women) in business and leadership. Kaweyan Business Development Services later grew to include a dried fruit export business and a taxi cab service.

From 2014 to 2015 Sidiqi was on the board of NGO Hand in Hand Afghanistan (a part of the Hand in Hand International network), an NGO that helps the rural poor in Afghanistan to turn their skills and potential into jobs. She provided strategic direction to the organization, which has trained 22,000 micro-entrepreneurs (mostly women) who have gone on to create over 8,000 businesses.

Sidiqi is a founding member of Leading Entrepreneurs of Afghanistan Development (LEAD). Founded in 2013, the organization was renamed to Afghan Women Chamber of Commerce and Industry (AWCCI) in 2017. She is also a member of a number of other influential international women's associations, including the Steering Committee for the South Asia Women's Entrepreneurship Symposium (SAWES).

From October 2014 to May 2017, she was the Presidential Deputy Chief of Staff for Afghanistan President Ashraf Ghani. Since June 2017, she has served as the Deputy Minister for Trade Affairs.
