= Bold (book) =

2015 book by Peter Diamandis and Steven Kotler

Bold: How to Go Big, Create Wealth and Impact the World
- First edition
- Author: Peter H. Diamandis, Steven Kotler
- Language: English
- Genre: Nonfiction
- Publisher: Simon & Schuster
- Publication date: 2015
- Pages: 317
- ISBN: 1476709564
- OCLC: 1065336709

Bold: How to Go Big, Create Wealth and Impact the World is a book by Peter H. Diamandis and Steven Kotler that was published in 2015.

== Theme ==
The book's three main points are:

1. How exponential technologies that are disrupting today's Fortune 500 companies are emerging faster than ever before, contrasting “exponential entrepreneurs” against “linear-thinking executives” who work in major corporations.
2. The psychological aspects of the bold. Here, Diamandis discusses what he learned from building his 15 companies.
3. Best practices, such as incentive competitions, crowd funding campaigns, and community building.

== Reception ==
The Washington Post wrote that it "looks only on the bright side" and "overlooks some of the risks in exponential technologies, particularly the legal and ethical dilemmas they are creating." The Wall Street Journal wrote that the "authors prefer to rhapsodize rather than analyze the consequences of technological advance" and that it shows how the Silicon Valley people are "profoundly different" from the "rest of us".
