= Jamie Wheal =

Writer

- Education: St. Mary's College of Maryland; University of Colorado at Boulder
- Occupations: Businessperson; Author

Jamie Wheal is a writer and co-founder of the Flow Genome Project. He is the co-author of Stealing Fire: How Silicon Valley, the Navy SEALs, and Maverick Scientists Are Revolutionizing the Way We Live and Work and author of Recapture the Rapture: Rethinking God, Sex, and Death in a World That's Lost Its Mind.

== Early life ==
Jamie Wheal was born in England and moved with his family to the US at the age of eight, spending much of his youth in Maryland. His father served as a Royal Navy test pilot and his mother was a South African nurse. He graduated from St. Mary's College of Maryland and received his MA in American studies and environmental history from the University of Colorado Boulder.

== Career ==
Wheal created a Montessori school with his wife in the early 2000s. In 2011 Wheal founded the Flow Genome Project in Austin, Texas in order to put together spiritual retreats where attendees learn about his concept of "Flow", a philosophy that focuses on altered states of consciousness and their economic impact on individuals and communities. Flow Genome Project leads retreats at his property called the Summit and in smaller areas he call "dojo domes", adventure trainings in remote wilderness settings and weeklong retreats, and at purpose-built Flow Dojos, which the Financial Times calls a "cross between a playground and a lab."

== Writing ==
Wheal, alongside Steven Kotler, co-authored Stealing Fire, which Wired Magazine described as "packed with neuroscience and imaging research that definitively locates ecstatic states in the human brain, along with nods to data on how to get there." Wheal makes use of a neuroanthropological perspective to assess the neuroscience and psychology of cultural movements. His most recent book is Recapture the Rapture: Rethinking God, Sex, and Death in a World That's Lost Its Mind.

== Personal life ==
Wheal is married and has two children, Luke and Emma. Wheal met his wife Julie while a sophomore studying at St. Mary's College of Maryland.
