= Todd B. Hawley =

- Born: April 13, 1961
- Died: May 11, 1995 (aged 34); San Francisco, California
- Known for: Founder of the International Space University

Todd B. Hawley (April 13, 1961 – July 11, 1995) was one of the three founders of the International Space University (ISU) and a lifelong advocate of human space exploration. He was born on April 13, 1961, the day after the first flight of Yuri Gagarin.

== Career ==
Todd Hawley attended George Washington University, where he received his Bachelor of Arts degree in Russian Studies and Economics and his Master of Arts degree in Space Policy.

While an undergraduate, Hawley started the local chapter of Students for the Exploration and Development of Space (SEDS). In 1982, along with Peter Diamandis and Robert D. Richards, he co-founded SEDS-USA as a national group, later serving as the Chairman from 1983 - 1985. The three would go on to found the Space Generation Foundation, with Hawley as its first executive director.

Mr. Hawley conducted extensive research on solar power satellites. He received the 1989 Space Industrialization Fellowship Award, the 1988 Aviation Week and Space Technology Laurel, the 1993 Space Frontier Foundation Pioneer Award, and the 1995 K. E. Tsiolkovsky Medal.

== International Space University ==
A founder of the International Space University (ISU), Todd Hawley served as the university's first chief executive officer and as a faculty member in the Space Humanities Department. He successfully managed ISU from a start-up organization to a global enterprise. ... He received the 1989 Space Industrialization Fellowship Award, the 1988 Aviation Week and Space Technology Laurel, the 1993 Space Frontier Foundation Pioneer Award, and the 1995 K. E. Tsiolkovsky Medal.

== Personal life ==
In 1990, Hawley came out publicly as a gay man, and spoke out against homophobia, stating that human bigotry was perhaps the one thing that could stand in the way of the work ISU was striving to accomplish.

== Death ==
Hawley died on 11 July 1995 from complications from AIDS. He is survived by his life partner, Yuri Hospodar, his family of origin, and his many colleagues and friends in the space communities.

In a "Founders' Flight" dedicated to the "pioneers of the new era of space", Todd Hawley's ashes were shot into space along with the ashes of Gene Roddenberry, Timothy Leary and 21 other founding thinkers and supporters of space exploration.

== Tributes ==
The International Space University (ISU) alumni Todd Hawley Award is named in his honour, as is the Todd B. Hawley Award for Student Leadership at Students for the Exploration and Development of Space (SEDS), and the ISU Todd B. Hawley Variable Gravity Research Facility.
