= Peter Diamandis =

Greek-American engineer, physician and entrepreneur

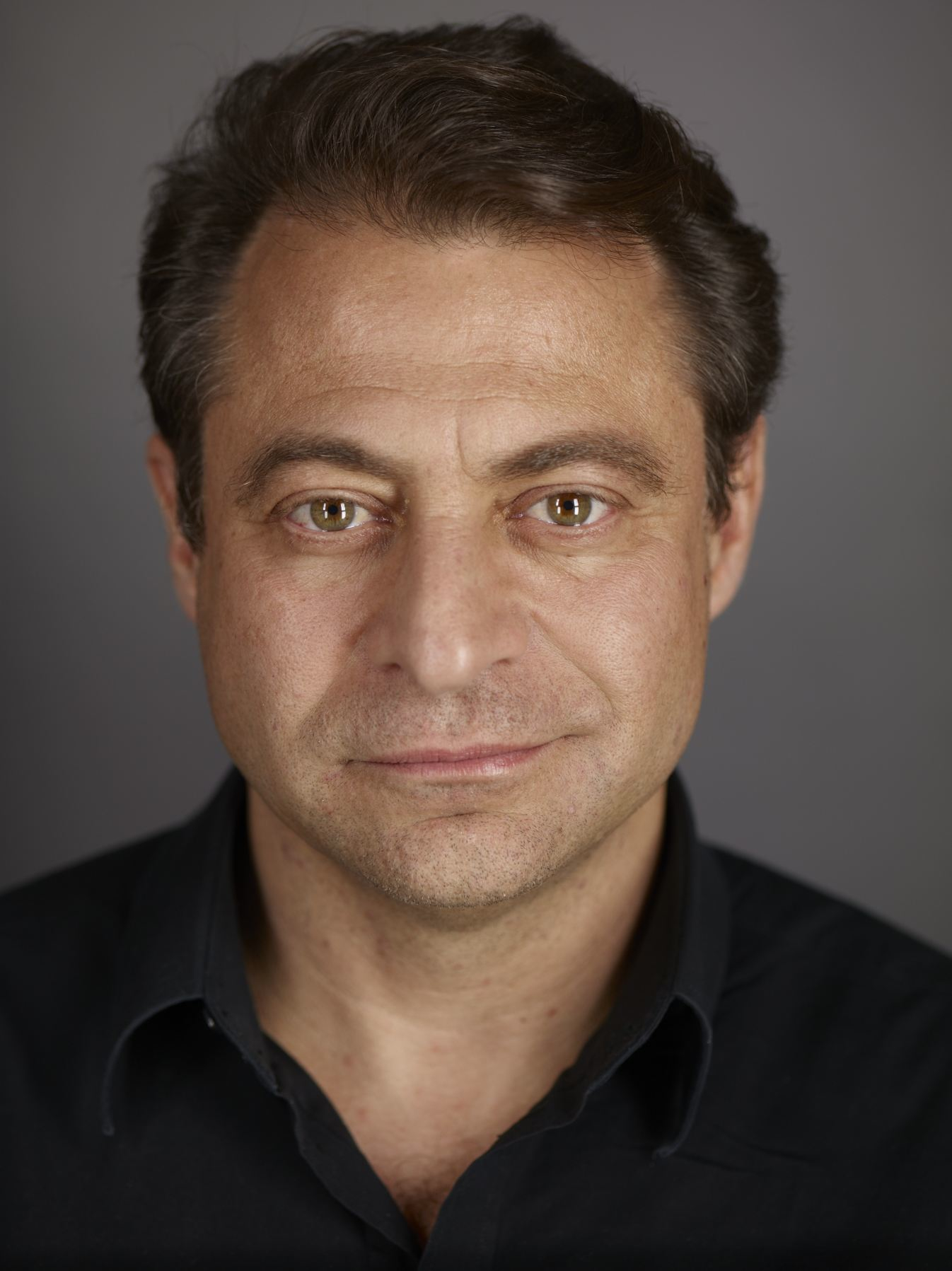
- Diamandis in 2011
- Born: May 20, 1961 (age 65); New York City, U.S.
- Education: Hamilton College; Massachusetts Institute of Technology (BS, MS); Harvard University (MD)
- Employer: X Prize Foundation
- Known for: Personal spaceflight industry
- Title: Chairman
- Website: diamandis.com

Peter H. Diamandis (/ˌdiːəˈmændɪs/ DEE-ə-MAN-diss; born May 20, 1961) is a Greek-American engineer, physician, and entrepreneur. He is best known as the founder and chairman of the XPRIZE Foundation, and the cofounder and executive chairman of Singularity University. He is also cofounder and former CEO of the Zero Gravity Corporation, cofounder and vice chairman of Space Adventures Ltd., founder and chairman of the Rocket Racing League, cofounder of the International Space University, cofounder of Planetary Resources, cofounder of Celularity, founder of Students for the Exploration and Development of Space, and vice chairman and cofounder of Human Longevity, Inc.

== Early life ==
Diamandis was born in the Bronx, New York City, to Greek immigrants. At age 12, Diamandis won first place in a rocket design competition.

After graduating from Great Neck North High School in 1979, Diamandis attended Hamilton College for his first year, then transferred to the Massachusetts Institute of Technology to study biology and physics. During his second year at MIT in 1980, he cofounded Students for the Exploration and Development of Space.

Diamandis graduated from MIT in 1983 and entered Harvard Medical School to pursue his MD through the Harvard–MIT Program in Health Sciences and Technology. During his second year of medical school, he cofounded the Space Generation Foundation to promote projects and programs that would help the "Space Generation"—all those born since the flight of Sputnik—get off the planet.

In 1986, Diamandis put his medical degree on hold and returned to MIT to pursue a master's degree in aeronautics and astronautics, conducting research at NASA Johnson Space Center, the MIT Man Vehicle Laboratory and MIT's Whitehead Biomedical Institute. After completing his M.S. at MIT, Diamandis returned to Harvard to complete his M.D.

During his last year of medical school in 1989, Diamandis acted as managing director of the International Space University and CEO of International Micro Space, a microsatellite launch company.

== Career ==
Diamandis has founded over 25 companies in the areas of longevity, space, venture capital, and education.

=== International Space University ===
In 1987, during his third year of medical school, Diamandis cofounded International Space University with Todd Hawley and Robert Richards. Diamandis served as the university's managing director and chief operating officer until 1989. Today, ISU offers a Space Studies program and two accredited Master of Space Studies degrees. Its $30 million campus is headquartered in Strasbourg, France.

=== International MicroSpace, Inc. ===
Diamandis cofounded Microsat Launch Systems, later renamed International MicroSpace Inc., in 1989 during his fourth year of medical school and served as the company's CEO. IMI designed a small launcher called Orbital Express (later renamed "ORBEX") for taking 100-kg payloads to low-Earth orbit, collaborating with Bristol Aerospace for the manufacture. The company won a $100 million SDIO contract for one launch plus nine options and was sold to CTA Inc of Rockville, MD in 1993 for $250,000. Diamandis joined CTA for one year as VP of Commercial Space Programs post-acquisition. The ORBEX contract was eventually canceled "because of a glut of small launchers," and CTA put the project on hold and eventually canceled the project.

=== Constellation Communications and Angel Technologies Corporation ===
In 1991, Diamandis founded Constellation Communications, Inc., one of five low-Earth orbit satellite constellations for voice telephony. The company planned to deploy an equatorial ring of 10 satellites to provide communications primarily to Brazil and Indonesia. Diamandis remained director until 1993, when it was acquired by Angel Technology. Between 1995 and 1999, Diamandis was the president of Angel Technologies Corporation, a commercial communications company that intended to develop wireless broadband communications networks based on a high-altitude aircraft.

=== XPRIZE Foundation ===
In 1994, Diamandis founded the XPRIZE Foundation after the failure of International MicroSpace, Inc and reading Charles Lindbergh's The Spirit of St. Louis. He serves as chairman and CEO of the foundation. XPRIZE was created to fund and operate a $10 million incentive competition intended to inspire a new generation of private passenger-carrying spaceships. The prize was announced on May 18, 1996, in St. Louis, without any purse money or teams. The prize was ultimately funded through an insurance policy underwritten by the Anousheh and Hamid Ansari Family and renamed the Ansari XPRIZE in their honor.

The $10 million competition attracted 26 teams from seven countries as teams and was won on October 4, 2004, by Mojave Aerospace Ventures, a team run by the aviation designer Burt Rutan and funded by Microsoft cofounder Paul Allen. The winning vehicle, SpaceShipOne, was piloted to space twice within two weeks to win the competition. The first flight was made on September 29, 2004, piloted by Mike Melvill, and the winning, second flight was made on October 4, 2004, by pilot Brian Binnie. SpaceShipOne was the world's first non-government piloted spacecraft and hangs in the National Air and Space Museum adjacent to the Spirit of St. Louis aircraft.

In January 2005, the XPRIZE Foundation Board of Trustees expanded the focus of the XPRIZE to address four different group areas: Exploration (oceans and space), Life Sciences, Energy and Environment, and Education and Global Development.

Since inception, the foundation has launched the $10M Ansari XPRIZE (awarded), the $10M Automotive XPRIZE (awarded), the $10M Archon XPRIZE (in progress), the $30M Google Lunar XPRIZE (in progress), the $10M Qualcomm Tricorder XPRIZE, the $2M Lunar Lander Challenge (awarded), the $1.4M Wendy Schmidt Oil Cleanup X Challenge (awarded), the Wendy Schmidt Ocean Health XPRIZE, and the $101 million XPRIZE Healthspan targeting aspects of the biology of aging. In May 2012, the Robin Hood Foundation announced its plans to partner with the XPRIZE Foundation for several New York-based challenges targeted at eradicating poverty.

The $101 million XPRIZE Healthspan was launched in November 2023. To win the competition, a team must demonstrate a therapeutic delivered in under 1 year that is capable of restoring muscle, immune, and cognitive functioning for people aged 65 to 80 by a minimum of 10 years, with a goal of 20 years.

The XPRIZE Foundation has a staff of approximately 50 and is headquartered in Culver City, California. Its board of trustees includes Larry Page, Elon Musk, James Cameron, Dean Kamen, Ratan Tata, Ray Kurzweil, Jim Gianopulos, Naveen Jain, Arianna Huffington, Will Wright, and Craig Venter.

The 2015 documentary Visioneer: The Peter Diamandis Story tells the story of the creation of XPRIZE.

In 2016, Julian Guthrie authored the book How to Make a Spaceship: A Band of Renegades, an Epic Race, and the Birth of Private Spaceflight, detailing the story behind the XPRIZE.

=== Private spaceflight ventures ===
In 1994, Diamandis cofounded the Zero Gravity Corporation (ZERO-G) with Byron K. Lichtenberg and Ray Cronise. The company offered weightless flight experiences aboard its Boeing 727 aircraft, and provided NASA with microgravity flight services for research purposes.

In 1998, Diamandis provided some of the initial funding for the space tourism company Space Adventures. In March 2008, Space Adventures acquired Zero Gravity Corporation. More than 15,000 people have flown on the G-Force One aircraft as of 2017.

Between 1999 and 2001, Diamandis was the CEO of BlastOff! Corporation, which proposed to fly a private rover mission to land on the Moon as a mix of entertainment, Internet and space. He commented on how the initial startup cost for the project was in the region of five million dollars, which was necessary to cover the costs of the servers, bandwidth and software. The company lost funding and ceased business in 2001.

=== Rocket Racing League ===
In 2005, Diamandis cofounded the Rocket Racing League. Developed as a cross between IndyCar racing and rockets, it envisioned enabling the public to enjoy speed, rockets and competitive spirits. Diamandis was the chairman of RRL until it ceased business.

=== Singularity University ===
In 2008, with the American author, inventor and futurist Ray Kurzweil, Diamandis cofounded Singularity University (SU), a Silicon Valley-based nonprofit offering education in futurology. It is now called the Singularity Group, as it is not a university. Diamandis now serves as its executive chairman. SU is an interdisciplinary organization based on the NASA Ames campus in Silicon Valley and is supported by a number of corporate founders and partners including Autodesk, Cisco, Nokia, Kauffman Foundation and ePlanet Ventures. The company runs a 10-week Graduate Studies Program and a seven-day Executive Program.

=== Planetary Resources Inc. ===
In April 2012, Diamandis cofounded Planetary Resources Inc., an organization dedicated to the identification, remote sensing and prospecting of near-Earth approaching asteroids, with Eric Anderson. He has also served on the company's board. Following financial troubles, it was announced in October 2018 that the company's human assets were purchased by the blockchain software technology company ConsenSys, Inc.

=== Biotechnology ventures ===
In March 2014, Diamandis cofounded Human Longevity Inc. (HLI), a genomics and cell therapy-based diagnostic and therapeutic company focused on extending the healthy human lifespan, with Craig Venter and Robert Hariri.

In 2015, he co-founded BOLD Capital Partners, a venture fund with $600M AUM investing in biotech and longevity.

In February 2018, Diamandis co-founded Celularity, a biotechnology company productizing allogeneic cells and tissues derived from the postpartum placenta, with Robert Hariri.

In 2020, Diamandis co-founded vaccine development company COVAXX with Mei Mei Hu and Lou Reese, as a subsidiary of United Biomedical Inc. (UBI). COVAXX (now Vaxxinity) is the developer of the UB-612 COVID-19 vaccine candidate. Diamandis also co-founded and is Executive Chairman of Fountain Life, a global longevity diagnostics and therapeutics provider.

Every year Diamandis hosts the Platinum Longevity Trip for a select group of high-net-worth individuals to learn about advancements in longevity and wellness.

Diamandis is a member of the executive advisory at Colossal Biosciences.

== Books ==
In 2012, with Steven Kotler, Diamandis coauthored Abundance: The Future Is Better Than You Think. The nonfiction work argues that advances in technology, entrepreneurship, and philanthropy have the potential to significantly raise global standards of living. Abundance was No. 2 on The New York Times Best Seller list, remaining on the list for nine weeks. It was No. 1 on the nonfiction bestseller lists of Amazon and Barnes and Noble.

In 2015, again with Kotler, Diamandis coauthored Bold: How to Go Big, Create Wealth, and Impact the World, which provides analysis and instruction for entrepreneurs interested in learning about exponential technologies, moon-shot thinking, and crowdsourcing.

January 28, 2020, Kotler and Diamandis released a third book in the "Exponential Mindset Trilogy" series, which includes Abundance (2012) and Bold (2015), in addition to The Future is Faster Than You Think: How Converging Technologies are Transforming Business, Industries, and Our Lives (2020), which examines the revolutionary changes brought about by convergence. The book argues that the already rapid pace of technological innovation is about to get even quicker.

In February 2022, Diamandis co-authored Life Force: How New Breakthroughs in Precision Medicine Can Transform the Quality of Your Life & Those You Love with Tony Robbins. The book, a New York Times bestseller, discusses various ways to boost energy, prevent disease, and extend vitality amidst health uncertainties.

In January 2025, Diamandis released Longevity Guidebook: How to Slow, Stop, and Reverse Aging—and NOT Die From Something Stupid.

== Communications ==
Diamandis hosts the MOONSHOTS podcast, about technological advancements, which has featured people such as Elon Musk, Cathie Wood, Michael Saylor, Eric Schmidt.

He was CEO of Desktop.tv, a spin-off company from BlastOff! designed to provide a global peer-to-peer television network for broadcasting unique content to the desktop.

Diamandis was chairman of Starport.com, an Internet channel for space exploration for kids of all ages. The site represents over 20 astronauts and features space heroes, missions and simulations. It was sold to Space.com in June 2000.

== Other achievements ==
Diamandis also:

- Cofounded and served as director of the Space Generation Foundation, a nonprofit organization established in 1985 to create, in all people born since the advent of the Space Age on October 4, 1957, a sense of identity and awareness that they are born as members of a space-faring race. The foundation supports numerous educational and research projects.
- Founded SpaceFair in 1983. SpaceFair is a national space conference that MIT hosted in 1983, 1985 and 1987.
- Was a key subject in the 2007 documentary film, Orphans of Apollo.
- Was a board member of Hyperloop and Cogswell Polytechnical College.
- Created the Abundance360 (A360) Summit, a program for entrepreneurs, C-level executives, and government leaders. Its inaugural event was held in Los Angeles in 2013.
- Attended the Telangana Global AI Summit 2024, where he spoke about the ethical challenges and transformative potential of AI, emphasizing India's youth as a key asset in navigating an era of rapid technological growth.
- Attended the 8th Future Investment Initiative in Riyadh, Saudi Arabia where he interviewed Elon Musk on robotics, starships and the future of AI.

=== Awards ===
- Winner of the Konstantine Tsiolkovsky Award (1995)
- World Technology Award for Space (2003)
- Lindbergh Award (2006)
- Wired RAVE (2006)
- Neil Armstrong Award for Aerospace Achievement and Leadership (2006)
- Inaugural Heinlein Award (2006)
- Aviation & Space Technology Laurel (twice)
- Arthur C. Clarke Award for Innovation (2007)
- Economist "No Boundaries" Innovator of the Year (2010)
- Honored by the Greek government with a 1.2 Euro stamp featuring his portrait to celebrate significant contributions to technological innovation (2016).

== Santa Monica COVID superspreader event ==
In February 2021, during the COVID-19 pandemic, MIT Technology Review reported that Diamandis held a "mostly maskless" event in Santa Monica in violation of the local stay-at-home order that became a superspreading event where 32 attendees became infected directly or indirectly. The event charged ultra-high-net-worth individuals up to $30,000 for tickets. In a follow-up article, Technology Review reported that after COVID-19 had spread among attendees, an "informational webinar" was delivered by Matt Cook, a trained anesthesiologist from the San Francisco Bay Area who had started a medical practice using alternative therapies. It is alleged that Cook tried to sell participants "fraudulent" treatments, including inhaled amniotic fluid and ketamine lozenges, which a professor of law and medicine at Stanford University called "quackery". The superspreading event was covered widely by publications including the New York Times and the Los Angeles Times.

== Personal life ==
Diamandis proposed to his girlfriend Kristen Hladecek on a Zero Gravity Corporation spaceflight in 2004. They have twin sons, born c. 2012.

== See also ==
- List of Greek Americans
- List of inductees in the International Space Hall of Fame
