= William Rempel =

American journalist

William C. Rempel
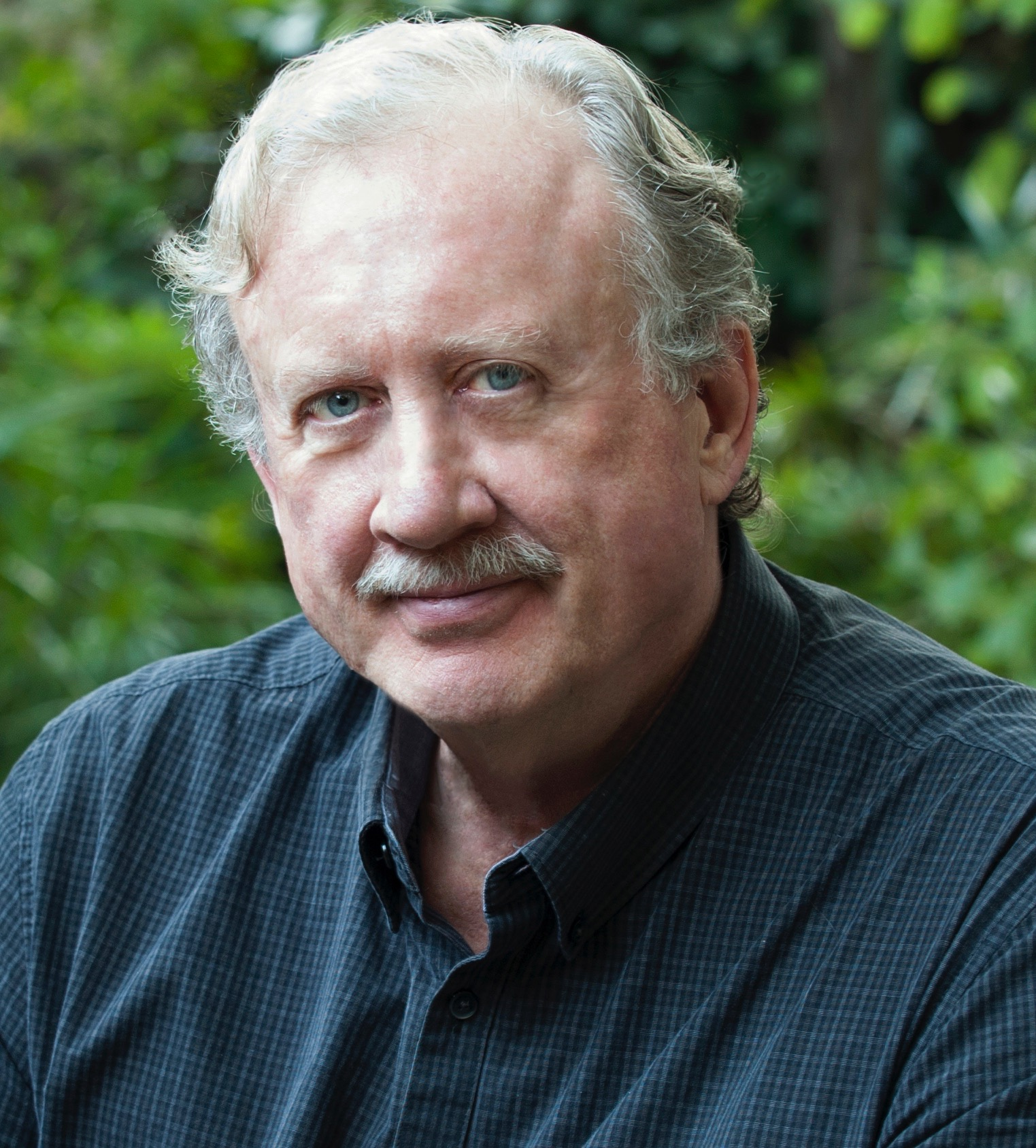
- William C. Rempel in 2017
- Born: William Charles Rempel; 1947 (age 78–79)
- Education: Pepperdine University
- Occupations: Author, investigative journalist
- Writing career
- Notable awards: Overseas Press Club Hal Boyle Award; Goldsmith Prize for Investigative Reporting, Finalist; Gerald Loeb Award
- Website: williamrempel.com

William Charles Rempel (born 1947) is an American author and investigative journalist.

Rempel's reporting about Colombian drug lords for the Los Angeles Times and in his book At the Devil’s Table have led to English and Spanish language television productions. He served as a story consultant for season 3 of the Netflix TV series Narcos (2017). The 80-episode telenovela En la Boca del Lobo (Sony-Telest, 2014) was based on the Spanish version of his book. Rempel's latest book, released by Dey Street and HarperCollins in January 2018, was The Gambler: How Penniless Dropout Kirk Kerkorian Became the Greatest Deal Maker in Capitalist History.

For most of his 40-year newspaper career, Rempel was an investigative reporter and editor at the Los Angeles Times. In 2015, he toured Ukraine and the Republic of Georgia on a U.S. State Department-sponsored mission to advocate the value of aggressive investigative reporting in those young democracies.

== Early life and education ==
Rempel was born in Palmer, the Territory of Alaska, a grandson of Matanuska Valley homesteaders from Michigan and Russia. When he was 10 years old, his family moved to California and continued to move frequently. His father was a door-to-door vacuum cleaner salesman, among other product lines. He attended public schools in Reedley, Fresno, Merced, Stockton, Oakland, El Monte and, finally, Whittier where he graduated from Richard Nixon's alma mater – Whittier High School. His first paid writing job was as a sports stringer for the Whittier Daily News that paid 15 cents per column inch of his published stories. He attended Pepperdine College on a journalism scholarship. He graduated with a BA degree in 1969 and went to work for the South Bay Daily Breeze in Torrance, California. Three years later he joined the Los Angeles Times.

== Career ==
=== Journalism career ===
Rempel's 36-year newspaper career with the Los Angeles Times began covering Southern California suburbs where his stories about fraudulent remodeling contractors led to state consumer protection legislation. A stint covering the waterfront led to a series of investigative stories about oil tanker safety. Audubon Magazine published a cover story based on his first-person account sailing aboard the Arco Juneau from Alaska to California, a decade before the disastrous grounding of the Exxon Valdez in Prince William Sound. Rempel joined the newspaper's national staff in 1980 as a Midwest correspondent based in Chicago.

As an investigative reporter assigned to the paper's financial staff, he was part of a team that exposed international arms and technology smuggling schemes that eventually became the Iran-Contra affair. Investigating the corrupt Ferdinand Marcos regime in the Philippines, he obtained then-secret Marcos diaries. Rempel's reporting from Arkansas in 1992 produced a series of exclusive stories about Bill Clinton that eventually became the Troopergate scandal in 1993. His role as a reporter and editor delving into terrorism threats led to exclusive reports about Osama bin Laden's al Qaeda organization two years before the 9/11 attacks. Among other major investigative projects was a report on widespread conflicts of interest among Las Vegas judges that resulted in statewide reforms. Rempel's work has also appeared in the International Herald Tribune, CNN.com and the Huffington Post. He has been a guest on various television news shows, including ABC’s Nightline, NBC’s Today, CNN’s Reliable Sources, Entertainment Tonight and Hardball with Chris Matthews.

=== Non-fiction Work ===
His most recent book, “The Gambler," debuted as a national bestseller. It is a narrative biography of Kirk Kerkorian, the media-shy billionaire and American business giant who transformed modern Hollywood and Las Vegas. Rempel's first book, Delusions of a Dictator – The Mind of Marcos as Revealed in His Secret Diaries, (Little Brown, 1993), chronicled the former president's rise to dictatorial power. It was revised and updated as an eBook titled Diary of a Dictator – Ferdinand & Imelda: The Last Days of Camelot, (Smashwords, 2015). His second book, At the Devil’s Table – The Untold Story of the Insider Who Brought Down the Cali Cartel. (Random House, 2011) was based on secret contacts spanning nearly a decade with a former cartel chief of security under federal witness protection. The book has since been translated into Spanish as En la Boca del Lobo (In the Jaws of the Wolf), Portuguese, Polish, Dutch and (soon) Italian. His story was featured in a public radio broadcast of This American Life (2012).

== Personal life ==
Covering the 1989 Exxon Valdez oil spill in Alaska, he met Barbara Hyde Pierce, a CBS News producer from Saratoga Springs, New York. Four years later they were married in the same log church in Palmer, Alaska, where his mother and father were wed in 1946. He has three grown children and three grandchildren. The couple lives in Los Angeles.

== Awards ==
- Overseas Press Club Hal Boyle Award (2001)
- Goldsmith Prize for Investigative Reporting (2002), Finalist
- Gerald Loeb Award (1980)

== Filmography ==
- Narcos (season 3) production consultant, Netflix (2017)
- En la boca del lobo (2014)
- Imelda (2003)
