= International Institute of Space Commerce =

- Abbreviation: IISC
- Formation: 2007
- Type: Non-profit
- Purpose: think-tank focusing on commercial space aspects
- Headquarters: Douglas, Isle of Man
- Location: Isle of Man
- Coordinates: 54.4°N 4.5°W
- Official language: English
- Director: Prof. Walter Peeters
- Website: iisc.im

The International Institute of Space Commerce (IISC) was established at the Isle of Man in 2007 as a corporation between the International Space University (ISU) and the Government of the Isle of Man. Realizing that the new space economy is being confronted with new challenges, it was felt necessary to establish a new think-tank focusing on commercial space aspects in addition to other space think-tanks, most of them with an emphasis on governmental space activities.

The location on the Isle of Man was targeted towards the growth of commercial space economy attracted on the Isle by creating a favorable environment for commercial space companies. The think-tank activity has been established and is intended to provide an added value to the services offered locally.

== History ==
The idea of IISC originated in 2007 based upon an agreement between both entities. In 2008, IISC was established as a non-profit organization with offices in Douglas, at the Isle of Man International Business School (IBS). Formal inauguration of IISC took place in Douglas on 4 October 2008, in the presence of Dr. Soyeon Yi, the first astronaut of Korea, NASA space veteran George Abbey, and local authorities.

After selection of senior fellows, a first series of studies and workshops were organized and based upon the growing reputation in the field of commercial space IISC was accepted as member of the International Astronautical Federation (IAF) in October 2011. At present, the following senior fellows are linked to the IISC activities:

- George Abbey, previous NASA director and presently lead at the Baker Institute for Space Studies
- Stephen Carse, an economic adviser and head of Treasury's economic affairs division for the Isle of Man government
- Prof. Patrick Cohendet, a specialist in the field of space economy
- Prof. Henry Herzfeld, a specialist in the field of space policy
- Michael Potter, a venture capitalist and space entrepreneur; specialized in telecom start-ups; producer and director of Orphans of Apollo documentary film.
- Prof. Kai-Uwe Schrogl, a former ESPI director and space policy expert
- Prof. Michael Simpson, a former president of the International Space University
- Prof. Kazuto Suzuki, a space policy expert with emphasis on the Asian Pacific space area

The results of the first 5 years of activity are under evaluation in order to decide the next phase of activities.

== Objectives ==
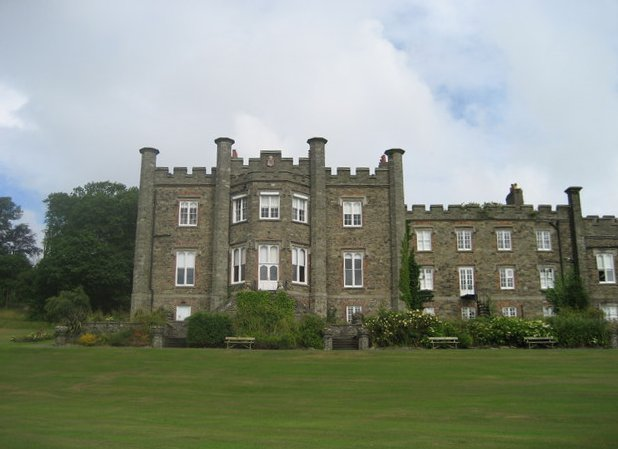
Isle of Man International Business School

IISC was established with the objectives to:

- Provide the IOM with a unique think-tank in order to provide an added value to the commercial space sector.
- Assist in supporting the Isle of Man capacity building in the field of space activities.
- Provide an outreach mechanism to support to promote establishing of space companies on the Isle of Man.

These objectives were pursued by:

- Organizing a number of topical workshops on items of high interest for the commercial space sector.
- Publishing of articles highlighting the work of the Institute in journals.
- Maintaining a website with original study material and articles.
- Performing studies on request.
- Publication of a new standard work on Space Commercialisation.
- Presence of IISC and IOM at IAF.

== Studies and outputs ==
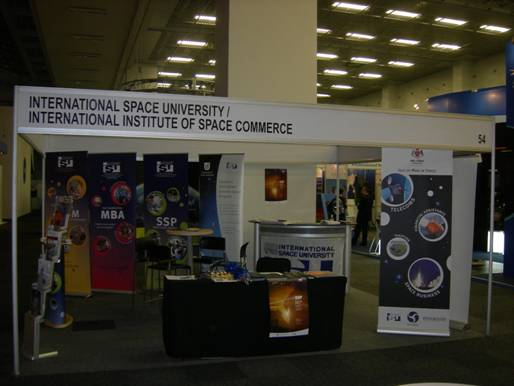
IISC Stand at IAC

An important communication vehicle is the IISC website. Indeed, the availability of this website allowed for publication of papers and ideas in the field of space commercialization within short delays.

Studies were produced on:

- Social responsibility in the sector of space operators,
- Space assets, and
- Orbital space tourism demand

and published, next to a number of research papers, on this website. Workshops were held on:

- The consequences of the financial crisis on the space sector.
- Space solutions for society.

Summaries of the main findings were published. In addition, the need was identified to write more books on the modern space economy. The first work was dedicated to Space Commerce, see also fig. 2

The importance and interaction between IISC and the space was described in extenso in a recent article in Space Policy.

Present planned activities are inter alia

- A workshop on the Space Data Association (SDA)
- A second book on Space in the framework of International Cooperation.
