= International Space University =

Non-profit interdisciplinary university

- Type: Non-profit interdisciplinary university
- Established: 1987
- Students: 200/year
- Campus: Global / virtual
- Website: www.isu.global

The International Space University (ISU) is a higher education institute dedicated to the discovery, research, and development of outer space and its applications for peaceful purposes, through international and multidisciplinary education and research programs. ISU was founded in 1987 by Peter H. Diamandis, Todd B. Hawley and Robert D. Richards, incorporated on July 15, 1987 in Massachusetts as a 501(c)3 non-profit corporation originally called 'International Space University Project, Inc.' (ISU changed its corporate name to 'International Space University Organization, Inc.' in 1991).

Supported by most of the world's space agencies, ISU created and began offering its flagship 'Space Studies Program' annually in cities around the world, starting with its inaugural 1988 session at the Massachusetts Institute of Technology (MIT).

Following an international competition for permanent global campus facilities in 1992 and 1993, ISU awarded its central campus operations to a bid group from Strasbourg, France, which incorporated in 1994 as a non-profit local association. The central campus building was built by the city of Strasbourg and inaugurated in 2002 as the principle headquarters of ISU and operated for over 20 years, however the association managing the ISU central campus ran into financial difficulty and was ordered liquidated by a court order on 7 July 2026. Following the French Association's liquidation order, ISU's global management reverted back to the foundational ISU Organization, Inc. in Massachusetts, that continues to offer ISU academic and professional training programs. ISU has relaunched its 'global campus initiative' to establish a decentralized network of ISU regional / national hubs and institutional affiliates.

Chancellors of the International Space University have included Eytan Stibbe, Pascale Ehrenfreund, Buzz Aldrin, Jean-Jacques Dordain, and Arthur C. Clarke.

== History ==
In 1985, space enthusiasts Peter Diamandis, Todd Hawley, and Robert D. Richards created the Space Generation Foundation, with the aim of fostering a sense of identity for people born since the beginning of the space era. One of the ideas developed by the foundation was for a dedicated 'Space University', which gained the support of a number of well-known figures in the space field, including U.R. Rao, Harrison Schmitt, Burton Edelson, Gerard K. O'Neill, Hermann Oberth, and Arthur C. Clarke.

The initiative was further developed and presented to the Advances in the Astronautical Sciences (AAS) meeting dedicated to Aerospace Century XXI in Boulder, Colorado in 1986. The following year, a three-day founding conference was convened at the Massachusetts Institute of Technology (MIT) from 10 to 12 April 1987; the dates were chosen to commemorate the first spaceflight of Yuri Gagarin (12 April 1961).

The founding conference culminated in the formal creation of the International Space University, established as a 501(c)(3) non-profit educational organization in Massachusetts. The first ISU Summer Session Program (SSP) took place at MIT from 20 June to 20 August 1988, with the support of major space agencies. The first international participants in the summer session were ceremonially led by the founders in a walk across the Charles River from MIT in Cambridge to Boston. The artwork for the first brochure was made by Pat Rawlings. The original offices of the ISU were in a Victorian townhouse overlooking Kenmore Square in Boston.

ISU originally evolved as a geographically decentralized institute, with summer sessions convened in a different country each year. Following an international competition for a host city for the Central Campus, the ISU moved its headquarters from Massachusetts to Illkirch-Graffenstaden, just south of Strasbourg, France, in 1994. During the first years, the Master of Science classes took place in the Pôle API of the École Nationale Supérieure de Physique de Strasbourg. The ISU central campus was managed from 2002 to 2026 by a non-profit association registered in Alsace, under an operational license from the foundational ISU entity, International Space University Organization, Inc., registered in the US in 1987 as a 501(c)(3) non-profit educational organization.

In 2002, with the help of local authorities, ISU obtained its own building in the Parc d'Innovation of Illkirch-Graffenstaden. The French Ministry of Education recognized ISU as an institute of higher education in 2004. ISU received permanent observer status with the United Nations Committee on the Peaceful Uses of Outer Space (COPUOS) of the United Nations Office for Outer Space Affairs in 1998, and was also granted full membership of the Space Agency Forum (SAF) in 1995. The university was a member of the International Astronautical Federation (IAF), and contributed to various international projects including the Asia-Pacific Regional Space Agency Forum, the IAF Symposium on "Bringing Space into Education", the World Space Workshop on Education, and the National Science Week Steering Committee.

In November 2017 the International Space University hosted a conference in Strasbourg that led to the formation of the Moon Village Association.

During the summer of 2026 the French campus closed due to financial struggles after public funding was cancelled. Consequently, the association in Strasbourg was put under watch by authorities as it faces bankruptcy.

== Academics ==
Since 1988, the university has offered academic and professional development programs across the world, including its flagship Space Studies Program (SSP) offered in July and August annually, a five-week Southern Hemisphere Space Studies Program (SHSSP) in partnership with Adelaide University, executive space courses offered worldwide, and Advanced Studies courses.

The university offered a Master in Space Studies (MSS) in Strasbourg, which could be completed in one year with an internship or in two years with a research thesis leading to the Master of Science (MSc) degree. It also offered a fully online research master's degree, the Master in Space Research (MPhil).

== Notable people ==
=== Founders ===
- Peter Diamandis
- Todd B. Hawley
- Robert D. Richards

=== Chancellors ===
- 1987–2004: Arthur C. Clarke
- 2004–2015: Jean-Jacques Dordain
- 2015–2018: Buzz Aldrin
- 2018–2021: Pascale Ehrenfreund
- 2022-2025 Dr. Valanathan Munsami
- 2025- present Eytan Stibbe

=== Presidents ===
- 1991–1994: George Van Reeth
- 1994–1998: Roland Doré
- 1998–2004: Karl Doetsch
- 2004–2011: Michael Simpson
- 2011–2018: Walter Peeters
- 2018–2021: Juan De Dalmau
- 2021–2023: Pascale Ehrenfreund
- 2023–2024: Nicolas Peter (Acting)
- 2024-2026: John Wensveen

=== Notable faculty ===
- Ben Finney, 1994-2003 co-chair of Space and Society department
- Dustin Bates, 2006 ISU Summer Session Program Teaching Associate

=== Astronauts ===
- Oleg Atkov, Russian Railways, Faculty
- James H. Newman, NASA, the first ISU alumnus (SSP 1989) to go into space
- Jeffrey Hoffman, NASA & MIT, Faculty
- Chiaki Mukai, JAXA, Faculty
- Reinhold Ewald, ESA, lecturer
- Jean-Jacques Favier, CNES, lecturer
- Robert Thirsk, CSA, lecturer
- Soyeon Yi, KARI, lecturer, the first astronaut to attend ISU (SSP 2009)
- Anousheh Ansari, the first person to receive an ISU honorary doctorate while in space
- Sergei Krikalev, Energya, Special Guest Lecturer
- Yang Liwei, CASC, Special Guest Lecturer
- Michel Tognini, CNES & ESA, Special Guest Lecturer
- Jessica Meir, NASA, alumna (MSS 2000)
