= List of challenge awards =

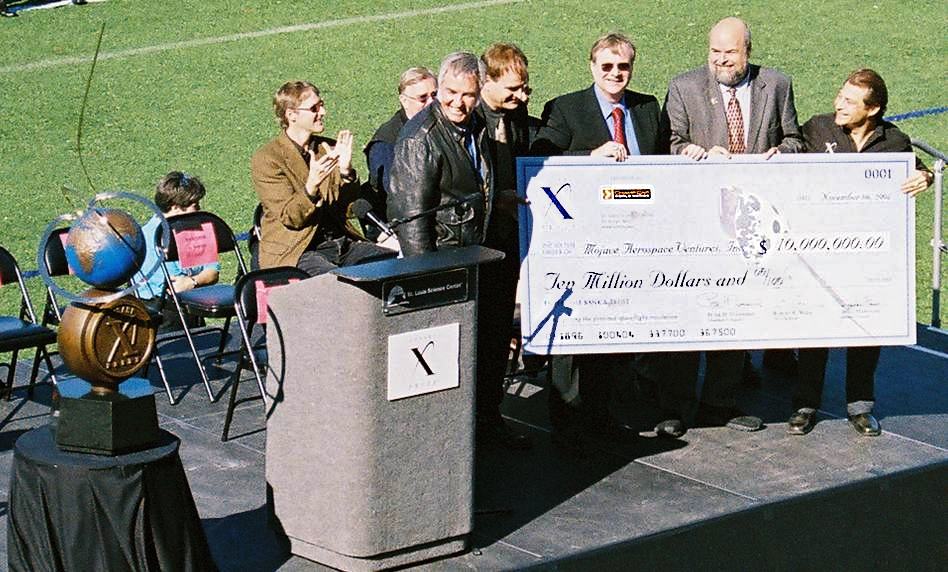
Presentation of $10 million check for Ansari X Prize

This list of challenge awards is an index to articles about notable challenge awards, or inducement prize contests. A cash prize is given for the accomplishment of a feat, usually of engineering.

== Offered before 1900 ==
Country	Award	Sponsor	First Offered	Description
France	Alkali prize	Louis XVI, French Academy of Sciences	1783	For a method to produce alkali from sea salt (sodium chloride). Achieved by Nicolas Leblanc in 1791.
France	Food preservation prize	Napoleon	1800	For a new way to preserve food. Won by Nicolas Appert in 1910.
United Kingdom	Longitude rewards	Parliament of United Kingdom	1714	Established by the Longitude Act. For anyone who could find a simple and practical method for the precise determination of a ship's longitude
France	Montyon Prize	French Academy of Sciences, Académie française	1820	A series of prizes awarded annually for making an industrial process less unhealthy, improving a mechanical process, book which rendered the greatest service to humanity, "prix de vertu" for the most courageous act by a poor Frenchman

== Offered in 20th century ==
Country	Award	Sponsor	First Offered	Description
United States	Hearst Transcontinental Prize	William Randolph Hearst	1910	To the first aviator to fly coast to coast across the United States, in either direction, in fewer than 30 days from start to finish. Expired in November 1911 without a winner.
United Kingdom	Daily Mail aviation prizes	Daily Mail newspaper	1906	Between 1906 and 1930 for various different achievements in aviation
France	Deutsch prize	Henri Deutsch de la Meurthe	1900	For first machine capable of flying a round trip from the Parc Saint Cloud to the Eiffel Tower in Paris and back in less than thirty minutes. Won in 1901.
United States	Dole Air Race	James Dole	1927	Air race across the Pacific Ocean from northern California to the Territory of Hawaii. Two of the eight planes successfully landed in Hawaii.
Hungary	Erdős problems	Paul Erdős	20th century	Payments for solutions to unresolved mathematical problems
United States	Feynman Prize in Nanotechnology	Foresight Institute	1993	For significant advances in nanotechnology
France	Grand Prix d'Aviation	Henri Deutsch de la Meurthe	1904	For the first person to fly a circular 1-kilometer course in a heavier-than-air craft. Won in 1908
United States	Intelligent Ground Vehicle Competition	United States Army CCDC Ground Vehicle Systems Center etc.	1993	Undergraduate and graduate student teams design and build an autonomous ground vehicle capable of completing several difficult challenges.
United States	Knuth reward check	Donald Knuth	1984	For finding technical, typographical, or historical errors, or making substantial suggestions for Knuth's publications.
United Kingdom	Kremer prize	Royal Aeronautical Society	1959	Series of awards for human-powered flight. First prize won in 1977 by the MacCready Gossamer Condor.
United States	Orteig Prize	Raymond Orteig	1919	For the first Allied aviator(s) to fly non-stop from New York City to Paris or vice versa. Won by Charles Lindbergh in 1927.
Germany	Wolfskehl Prize	Paul Wolfskehl	1906	For proving Fermat's Last Theorem. Won by Andrew Wiles in 1997

== Offered in 21st century ==
Country	Award	Sponsor	First Offered	Description
Africa (Various)	Afri-Plastics Challenge	Government of Canada, via Challenge Works	2023	For the reduction of marine plastics in Sub-Saharan African countries by developing and scaling innovative solutions to plastic mismanagement.
United States	America's Space Prize	Robert Bigelow	2004	For first US-based team to design and build a reusable crewed capsule capable of flying five astronauts to a Bigelow Aerospace inflatable space module. Expired in 2010 without a winner.
United States	Ansari X Prize	Anousheh Ansari, Amir Ansari via X Prize Foundation	1996	For first non-government organization to launch a reusable crewed spacecraft into space twice within two weeks. Won in 2004.
United States	Archon X Prize	Stewart Blusson via X Prize Foundation	2006	For the first team to rapidly, accurately and economically sequence 100 whole human genomes to an unprecedented level of accuracy. Cancelled in 2013.
United States	Automotive X Prize	Progressive Corporation via X Prize Foundation	2007	For super-efficient low-emission vehicles in three categories. Awarded in 2010
United States	Brain Preservation Technology Prize	Brain Preservation Foundation	2010	For long-term storage of a brain's connectome. Small mammal prize won in 2016 and large mammal prize in 2018
United Kingdom	Brexit Prize	Institute of Economic Affairs	2013	For best plan for a UK exit from the European Union. Awarded in 2014.
United States	Buckminster Fuller Challenge	Buckminster Fuller Institute	2007	Annual international design competition for the most comprehensive solution to a pressing global problem.
United States	Centennial Challenges	NASA	2003	For various non-government-funded technological achievements by American teams.
United States	Cornell Cup USA	Cornell University	2011	Annual embedded design competition to empower student teams to become the inventors of the newest innovative applications of embedded technology
United States	DARPA Grand Challenge	DARPA	2004	Series of prizes for autonomous vehicles.
United States	DARPA Network Challenge	DARPA	2009	Contest to use social networking to locate ten red balloons placed around the United States. Won in less than 9 hours.
United States	DARPA Shredder Challenge 2011	DARPA	2011	Contest to reconstruct documents shredded by a variety of paper shredding techniques.
United States	DARPA Spectrum Challenge	DARPA	2013	Contest for a radio protocol that can best use a given communication channel in the presence of other dynamic users and interfering signals.
United Kingdom	Earthshot Prize	The Royal Foundation	2021	Until 2030. Contests for sustainable development in environmental work annually.
United States	Elevator:2010	Spaceward Foundation, NASA Centennial Challenges	2005	Until 2010. Contests for space elevator and related technologies. Annual competitions for climbers, ribbons and power-beaming systems
International	Global Security Challenge	InnoCentive	2006	For the most promising security technology startups in the world.
United States	Google Lunar X Prize	Google via X Prize Foundation	2007	For landing a robot on the surface of the Moon, traveling 500 meters over the lunar surface, and sending images and data back to the Earth. Expired in 2018 with no winner.
Australia	Hutter Prize	Marcus Hutter	2006	For each 1% data compression improvement on a specific 100 MB English text file.
United States	Hyperloop pod competition	SpaceX	2015	To design—and for some, build—a subscale prototype transport vehicle to demonstrate technical feasibility of various aspects of the Hyperloop concept.
United States	L Prize	United States Department of Energy	2008	For the replacement of two types of light bulb, an A19 60-watt incandescent light bulb and a PAR 38 halogen incandescent bulb
United Kingdom	Longitude Prize	Nesta	2012	For a team of researchers that develops an affordable, accurate, and fast point-of-care test for bacterial infection that is easy to use anywhere in the world
United States	Lunar Lander Challenge	NASA Centennial Challenges	2006	Series of prizes for teams that launch a vertical takeoff/vertical landing (VTVL) rocket that achieved the total delta-v needed for a vehicle to move between the surface of the Moon and its orbit.
United States	Methuselah Mouse Prize	Methuselah Foundation	2003	To the research team that broke the world record for the oldest-ever mouse; and to the team that developed the most successful late-onset rejuvenation strategy
United States	Millennium Prize Problems	Clay Mathematics Institute	2000	For solving any of: P versus NP problem, Hodge conjecture, Poincaré conjecture (solved), Riemann hypothesis, Yang–Mills existence and mass gap, Navier–Stokes existence and smoothness, Birch and Swinnerton-Dyer conjecture
United Kingdom	N-Prize	Paul H. Dear	2008	To launch a satellite weighing between 9.99 and 19.99 grammes into Earth orbit, and to track it for a minimum of nine orbits. The launch budget must be under £999.99 including the launch vehicle, all of the required non-reusable launch equipment hardware, and propellant
United States	Netflix Prize	Netflix	2006	For the best collaborative filtering algorithm to predict user ratings for films, based on previous ratings without any other information about the users or films. Won in 2009.
France	Peugeot Concours Design	Peugeot	2000	To design a Peugeot car for the year 2020
United States	Prize4Life	Avi Kremer, ALS Association	2007	For the discovery of treatments and a cure for amyotrophic lateral sclerosis.
United States	Space Poop Challenge	NASA	2016	New designs for space toilet systems for use in space suits
United States	Tricorder X Prize	Qualcomm via X Prize Foundation	2011	For an automatic non-invasive health diagnostics system in a single portable package that weighs no more than 5 pounds (2.3 kg), able to autonomously diagnose 13 medical conditions
Australia	UAV Outback Challenge	Australian Research Centre for Aerospace Automation	2007	For the development of unmanned aerial vehicles.
United Kingdom	Virgin Earth Challenge	Richard Branson	2007	For a commercially viable design which results in the permanent removal of greenhouse gases from the Earth's atmosphere to contribute materially to global warming avoidance
United States	Wendy Schmidt Oil Cleanup X Challenge	The Schmidt Family Foundation via X Prize Foundation	2010	For efficient capturing of crude oil from ocean water
United States	X Prize Cup	State of New Mexico via X Prize Foundation	2005	For e.g. rocket-powered bicycles, rocket jet packs, lunar lander and space elevator

== See also ==
- Inducement prize contest
- Space elevator competitions
- Competitions and prizes in biotechnology
- Data science competition platform
- Lists of awards
