= Competitions and prizes in biotechnology =

There exist a number of competitions and prizes to reward distinguished contributions and to encourage developments in biotechnology.

== Inducement prizes ==
- The Archon X Prize for Genomics of US$10,000,000 is to be awarded to "the first Team that can build a device and use it to sequence 100 human genomes within 10 days or less, with an accuracy of no more than one error in every 100,000 bases sequenced, with sequences accurately covering at least 98% of the genome, and at a recurring cost of no more than $10,000 (US) per genome."
- The Prize4Life ALS biomarker prize is a US$1,000,000 award for a reliable way of tracking progression of amyotrophic lateral sclerosis (ALS).
- The Prize4Life ALS treatment prize is a US$1,000,000 award for a therapy that reliably and effectively extends the life of ALS mice by 25%.
- People for Ethical Treatment of Animals (PETA) is offering a US$1,000,000 reward for a method of producing enough meat to be marketed in 10 U.S. states at a price competitive with chicken prices.
- Illumina iDEA Challenge to develop new visualization and data analysis techniques.

== Recognition prizes ==
- The Gotham Prize for Cancer Research was a US$1,000,000 prize awarded annually to "encourage new and innovative approaches to cancer research by fostering collaboration among top thinkers in the field--with the goal of leading to progress in the prevention, diagnosis, etiology and treatment of cancer."
- Gruber Prize in Genetics is a US$500,000 prize awarded annually for distinguished contributions in any realm of genetics research.
- The Nobel Prize in Physiology or Medicine is an annual grant worth approximately 10 million SEK. It is routinely awarded for contributions to biotechnology.

== See also ==
- Inducement prize contest
- Golden Eurydice Award
- List of challenge awards
