= OmniCompete =

Defunct British innovation competition and open innovation company

- Type: Private / Defunct
- Industry: Innovation challenges / competitions / open innovation / prize competitions
- Founded: 2010
- Fate: Acquired by InnoCentive in February 2012
- Successor: InnoCentive
- Headquarters: London, United Kingdom
- Area served: Worldwide
- Products: Innovation challenge platforms / competitions (eg. Global Security Challenge, Energy Storage Challenge, Health Pitch Battlefield)
- Parent: InnoCentive
- Website: omnicompete.com

OmniCompete is an organisation specialising in the design and implementation of innovation competitions. In February 2012 OmniCompete was acquired by InnoCentive. One of the original founders went on to co-found the crowdsharing platform Zyncd in 2014.

== OmniCompete ==
OmniCompete is an organisation specialising in the design and implementation of innovation competitions. It promotes Open Innovation through various prize challenges worldwide, offering financial rewards to successful innovators from across a diverse range of industries and sectors. Previous and ongoing competitions include the Global Security Challenge, the Energy Storage Challenge, the Cyber Security Challenge and the Health Pitch Battlefield.

== History ==
The idea behind OmniCompete and its predecessor company, Global Security Challenge (GSC) was developed at London Business School in 2005, where the founders met during their MBAs. Simon Schneider and Janeen Chupa-Brimacombe founded the Global Security Challenge in 2006 and the competition has run annually since then. Building on this foundation in the security sector, the organisation has expanded into other areas, initiating the Energy Storage Challenge and Health Division in 2010. The umbrella company, OmniCompete Limited, was founded in 2010 and US subsidiary OmniCompete Inc. was incorporated in 2011. In 2012, OmniCompete was acquired by InnoCentive.

== Company ==
OmniCompete is based in London, UK. Its board members include the honourable H. Lee Buchanan III, who used to be Deputy Director of DARPA before his current role as VC at Paladin Capital Group.

OmniCompete has hosted over 20 international competitions in the areas of security, energy, social innovation and cloud computing, with over $2.9 million in prizes.

== Winners and Finalists ==
Over the past five years, OmniCompete has awarded many prizes to a wide range of innovative startups and SMEs. Previous winners include:

- Australian SME iwebgate who received the 2010 Best Security SME Prize ($300,000 prize fund) for the development of an online security product which represents a virtual, highly-secure reception area between an organisations' trusted network and volatile public networks like the Internet.
- Ghanaian startup mPedigree won the Best Security Startup 2010 award - for developing the first system in the world which enables consumers and patients to verify the authenticity of their medicines by sending a free text message of the unique, product-embossed codes.
- Kromek who won Best Security SME 2009 for developing a threat liquid identification system (bottle scanner) which can deal with individual containers and also a unit for screening multiple containers in a 311 bag configuration.
- Ksplice, who won the 2009 Cyber Security Challenge for developing software that improves security, reliability and maintainability through seamless updates. Ksplice was recently acquired by Oracle.

Winners and finalists have often secured investments and acquisition deals through their participation in OmniCompete competitions. Former Global Security Challenge finalist TenCube was recently acquired by McAfee. Vumii, Secerno and DecaWave provide more examples of finalists who have since raised significant funding.
