= H. Lee Buchanan III =

American government official

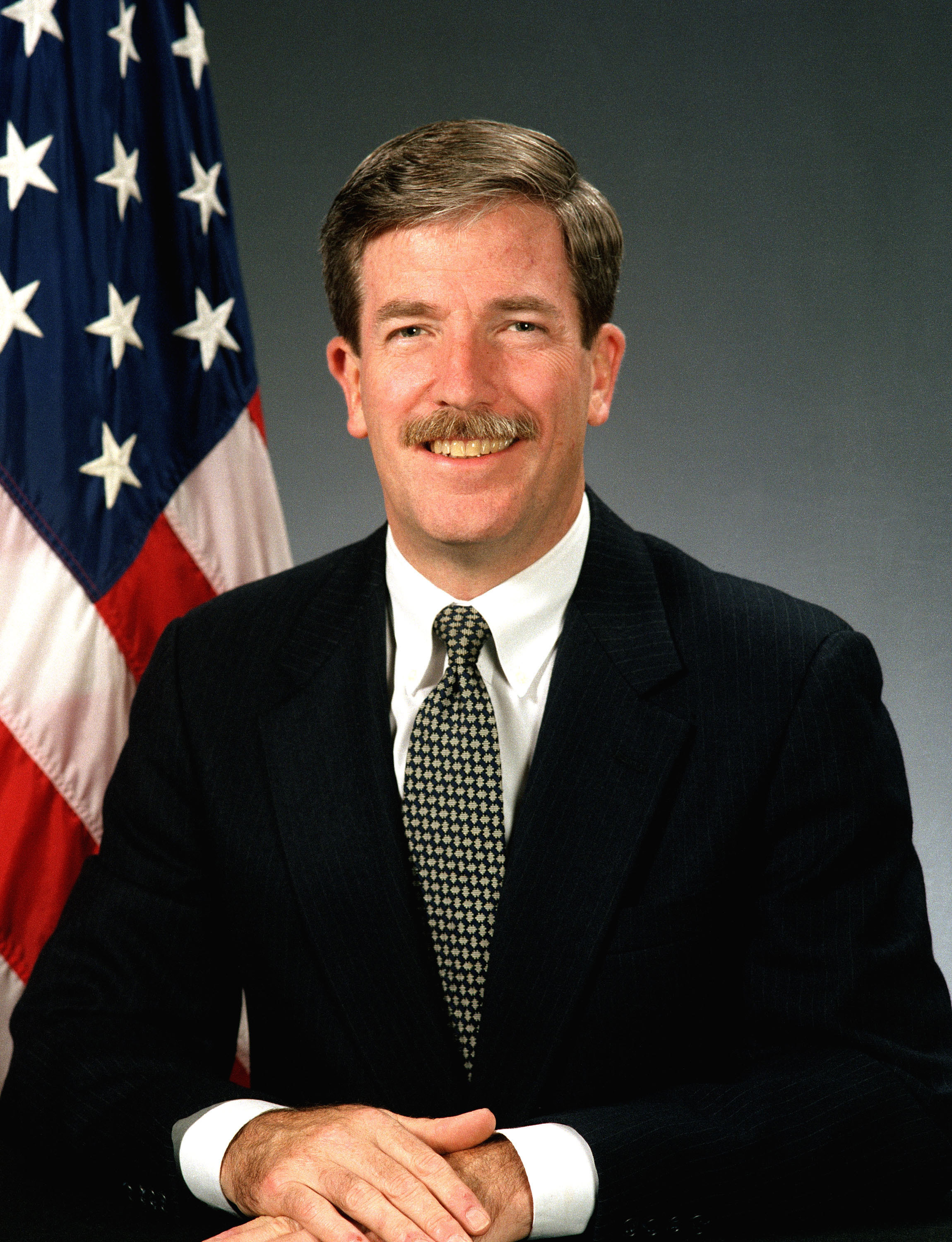
H. Lee Buchanan III in 1998

Herbert Lee Buchanan III (born July 29, 1949) was United States Assistant Secretary of the Navy (Research, Development and Acquisitions) from 1998 to 2001.

== Biography ==
H. Lee Buchanan III was born in Waynesville, North Carolina and raised in Nashville, Tennessee and graduated from the Montgomery Bell Academy in 1967. He attended Vanderbilt University and the University of California, Berkeley, where he received a Ph.D. in applied physics.

Buchanan joined the United States Navy in 1971, and served as a naval flight officer from 1971 to 1978. He left the Navy in 1978, but remained a captain in the United States Navy Reserve until 2001. In 1979, he became senior physicist at the Lawrence Livermore National Laboratory. He left the Lawrence Livermore National Laboratory in 1982, joining Titan Corp. as Division Manager for Applied Science. He joined the Advanced Research Projects Agency (later renamed the Defense Advanced Research Projects Agency) in 1985, culminating in his appointment as its deputy director in March 1996.

On September 9, 1998, President Bill Clinton nominated Buchanan as Assistant Secretary of the Navy (Research, Development and Acquisitions) and Buchanan subsequently held this office from October 2, 1998, until January 20, 2001.

Upon leaving office, Buchanan joined Paladin Capital Group. He was a board member of crowdsourcing company OmniCompete from 2011 until its acquisition by Innocentive in January 2012.

Government offices
Preceded by John W. Douglass	Assistant Secretary of the Navy (Research, Development and Acquisitions); October 2, 1998 – January 20, 2001	Succeeded by Paul A. Schneider (acting); John J. Young, Jr.
