= Space toilet =

Toilet used in weightless environments

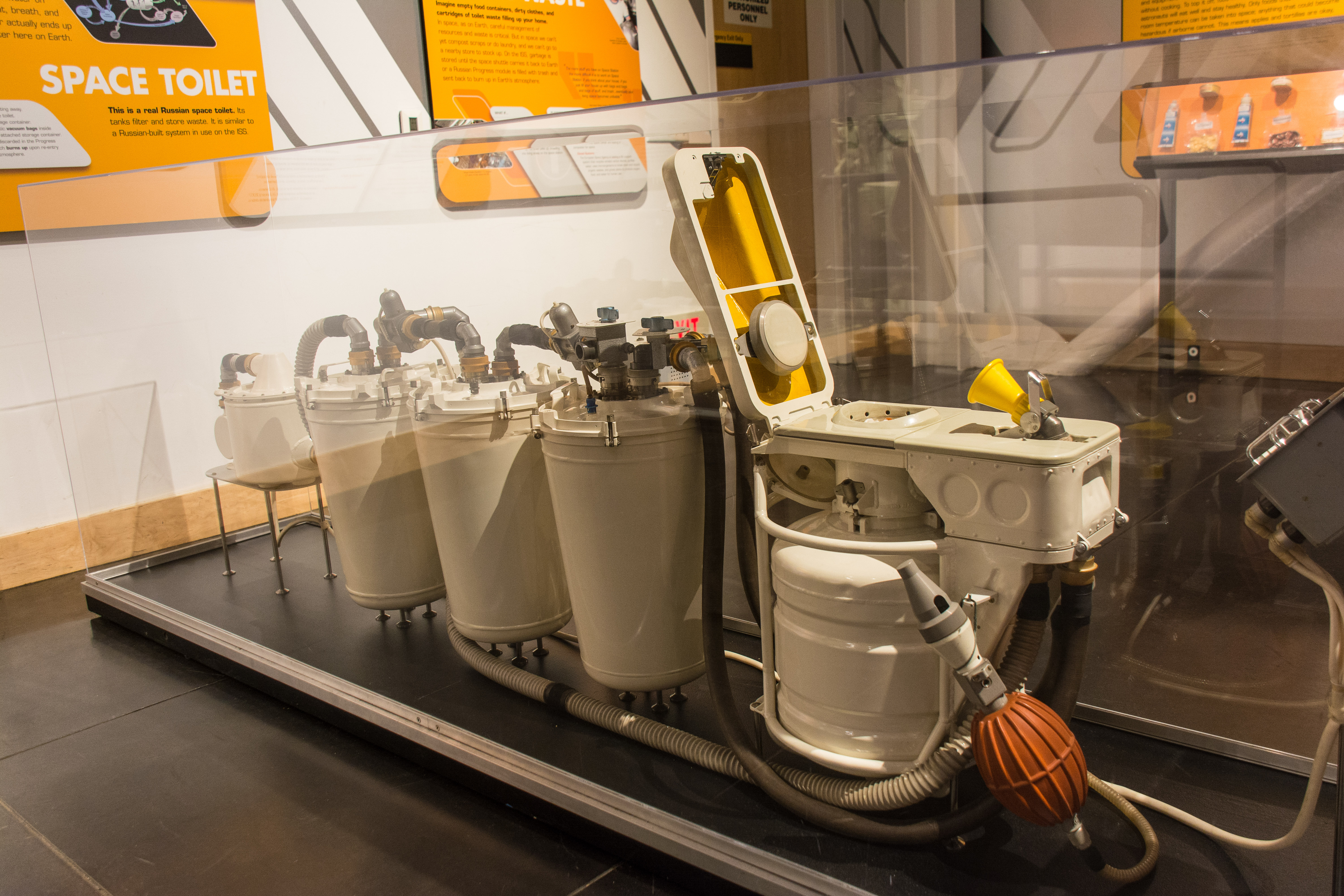
Space toilet

A space toilet or zero-gravity toilet is a toilet that can be used in a weightless environment. In the absence of weight, the collection and retention of liquid and solid waste is directed by use of airflow. Since the air used to direct the waste is returned to the cabin, it is filtered beforehand to control odor and cleanse bacteria. In older systems, wastewater is vented into space, and any solids are compressed and stored for removal upon landing. More modern systems expose solid waste to vacuum pressures to kill bacteria, which prevents odor problems and kills pathogens.

== Background ==
Astronauts say that they are most often asked how they go to the bathroom in space. In space, weightlessness causes fluids to distribute uniformly around human bodies. Kidneys detect the fluid movement and a physiological reaction causes the humans to need to relieve themselves within two hours of departure from Earth. The space toilet was thus the first device activated on shuttle flights, after astronauts unbuckled themselves.

== Mechanism ==
In the absence of gravity, space toilets use air flow to pull urine and feces away from the body and into the proper receptacles. A new feature of the space toilet is the automatic start of air flow when the toilet lid is lifted, which also helps with odor control. By popular (astronaut) demand, it also includes a more ergonomic design requiring less clean-up and maintenance time, with corrosion-resistant, durable parts to reduce the likelihood of maintenance outside of the set schedule. Less time spent on plumbing means more time for the crew to spend on science and other high-priority exploration focused tasks.

The crew use a specially shaped funnel and hose for urine (suction cup) and the seat for bowel movements. The funnel and seat can be used simultaneously, reflecting feedback from female astronauts. The space toilet seat may look uncomfortably small and pointy, but in microgravity, it is ideal. It provides ideal body contact to make sure that everything goes where it should.

The space toilet includes foot restraints and handholds for astronauts to keep themselves from floating away. Everyone positions themselves differently while "going", and consistent astronaut feedback indicated that the traditional thigh straps were a hassle.

Toilet paper, wipes, and gloves are disposed of in water-tight bags. Solid waste in individual water-tight bags is compacted in a removable fecal storage canister. A small number of fecal canisters are returned to Earth for evaluation, but most are loaded into a cargo ship that burns up on re-entry through Earth's atmosphere. Currently, fecal waste is not processed for water recovery, but NASA is studying this capability.

== Basic parts ==
Diagram of the elements of the Space Shuttle WCS

There are four basic parts in a space toilet: the liquid-waste vacuum tube, the vacuum chamber, the waste storage drawers, and the solid-waste collection bags. The liquid-waste vacuum tube is a 2-to-3-foot (61 to 91 cm) long rubber or plastic hose that is attached to the vacuum chamber and connected to a fan that provides suction. At the end of the tube is a detachable urine receptacle, which comes in different versions for male and female astronauts. The male urine receptacle is a plastic funnel 2 to 3 inches (5 to 8 cm) in width and about 4 inches (10 cm) deep. A male astronaut urinates directly into the funnel from a distance of 2 to 3 inches (5 to 8 cm) away. The female funnel is oval and is 2 by 4 inches (5 by 10 cm) wide at the rim. Near the funnel's rim are small holes or slits that allow air movement to prevent excessive suction. The vacuum chamber is a cylinder about 1-foot (30 cm) deep and 6 inches (15 cm) wide with clips on the rim, where waste collection bags may be attached and a fan that provides suction. Urine is pumped into and stored in waste storage drawers. Solid waste is stored in a detachable bag made of a special fabric that lets gas (but not liquid or solid) escape, a feature that allows the fan at the back of the vacuum chamber to pull the waste into the bag. When the astronaut is finished, he or she then twists the bag and places it in a waste storage drawer. Samples of urine and solid waste are frozen and taken to Earth for testing.

== Designs ==
=== Space Shuttle Waste Collection System ===
The toilet used on the Space Shuttle is called the Waste Collection System (WCS). In addition to air flow, it also uses rotating fans to distribute solid waste for in-flight storage. Solid waste is distributed in a cylindrical container, which is then exposed to vacuum to dry the waste. Liquid waste was disposed of by discharging it into space.

The WCS required many hours of training. For urination, a hose was used. For defecation, with a 4 inches (100 mm) diameter for the hole in the seat—much smaller than in a conventional toilet—the user's bottom needed to be exactly centered on the seat. NASA built a simulator with a video camera in the hole; those training used a crosshair to learn how to position their bodies, while other astronauts watched and made jokes.

The WCS had several malfunctions in flight. On the eight-day STS-3 test flight, the toilet had broken down, and its two-man crew (Jack Lousma and Gordon Fullerton) resorted to fecal containment devices (FCD) for waste elimination and disposal. An anomaly of the liquid disposal system on Discovery during its maiden flight resulted in a buildup of frozen excrements outside the orbiter, which was then removed by means of Canadarm. During STS-46, one of the fans malfunctioned, and crew member Claude Nicollier was required to perform in-flight maintenance (IFM).

=== International Space Station ===
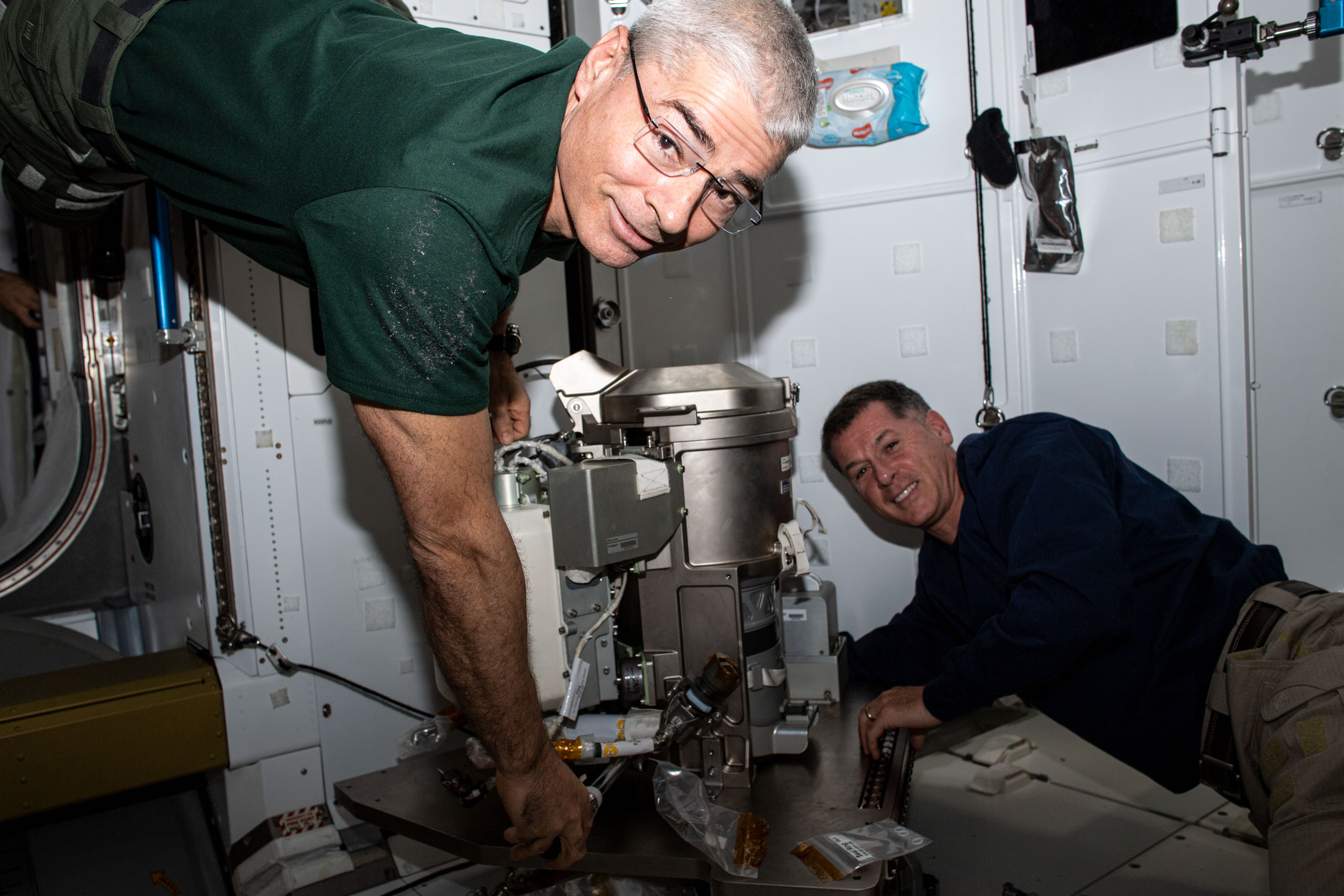
Expedition 65 Flight Engineers Mark Vande Hei (from left) and Shane Kimbrough partner together for orbital plumbing tasks as they install a new toilet inside the International Space Station's Tranquility module.

There are three toilets on the International Space Station, located in the Zvezda, Nauka and Tranquility modules. They use a fan-driven suction system similar to the Space Shuttle WCS. Liquid waste is collected in 20-litre (5.3 US gal) containers. Solid waste is collected in individual micro-perforated bags, which are stored in an aluminum container. Full containers are transferred to Progress for disposal. An additional Waste and Hygiene Compartment is part of the Tranquility module launched in 2010. In 2007, NASA purchased a Russian-made toilet similar to the one already aboard ISS rather than develop one internally.

On May 21, 2008, the gas–liquid separator pump failed on the 7-year-old toilet in Zvezda, although the solid-waste portion was still functioning. The crew attempted to replace various parts, but was unable to repair the malfunctioning part. In the interim, they used a manual mode for urine collection. The crew had other options: to use the toilet on the Soyuz transport module (which only has capacity for a few days of use) or to use urine-collection bags as needed. A replacement pump was sent from Russia in a diplomatic pouch, so that Space Shuttle Discovery could take it to the station as part of mission STS-124 on June 2.

=== Other designs ===
The Soviet/Russian space station Mir's toilet also used a system similar to the WCS.

While the Soyuz spacecraft had an onboard toilet facility since its introduction in 1967 (due to the additional space in the Orbital Module), all Gemini and Apollo spacecraft required astronauts to urinate in a so-called "relief tube", in which the contents were dumped into space, while fecal matter was collected in specially designed bags. The facilities were so uncomfortable that, to avoid using them, astronauts ate less than half the available food on their flights. The Skylab space station, used by NASA between May 1973 and March 1974, had an onboard WCS facility, which served as a prototype for the Shuttle's WCS, but also featured an onboard shower facility. The Skylab toilet, which was designed and built by the Fairchild Republic Corp. on Long Island, was primarily a medical system to collect and return to Earth samples of urine, feces and vomit, so that calcium balance in astronauts could be studied.

Even with the facilities, astronauts and cosmonauts for both launch systems employ pre-launch bowel clearing and low-residue diets to minimize the need for defecation. The Soyuz toilet has been used on a return mission from Mir.

NPP Zvezda is a Russian developer of space equipment, which includes zero-gravity toilets.

A $23 million next-generation space toilet called the Universal Waste Management System (UWMS) is being developed by NASA for Orion and the International Space Station. The UWMS is the first space toilet designed specifically for women as well as men, easing the use of space toilets for women and use for stool and urine at the same time. It is designed to be fully automated, quieter, lighter, more reliable, more hygienic and more compact than previous systems. Among its innovations, the UWMS relies on a 3D printing technique to incorporate metals including Inconel, Elgiloy, and titanium that can withstand the acids used to treat urine within the toilet. The UWMS was first delivered to the ISS in October 2020.

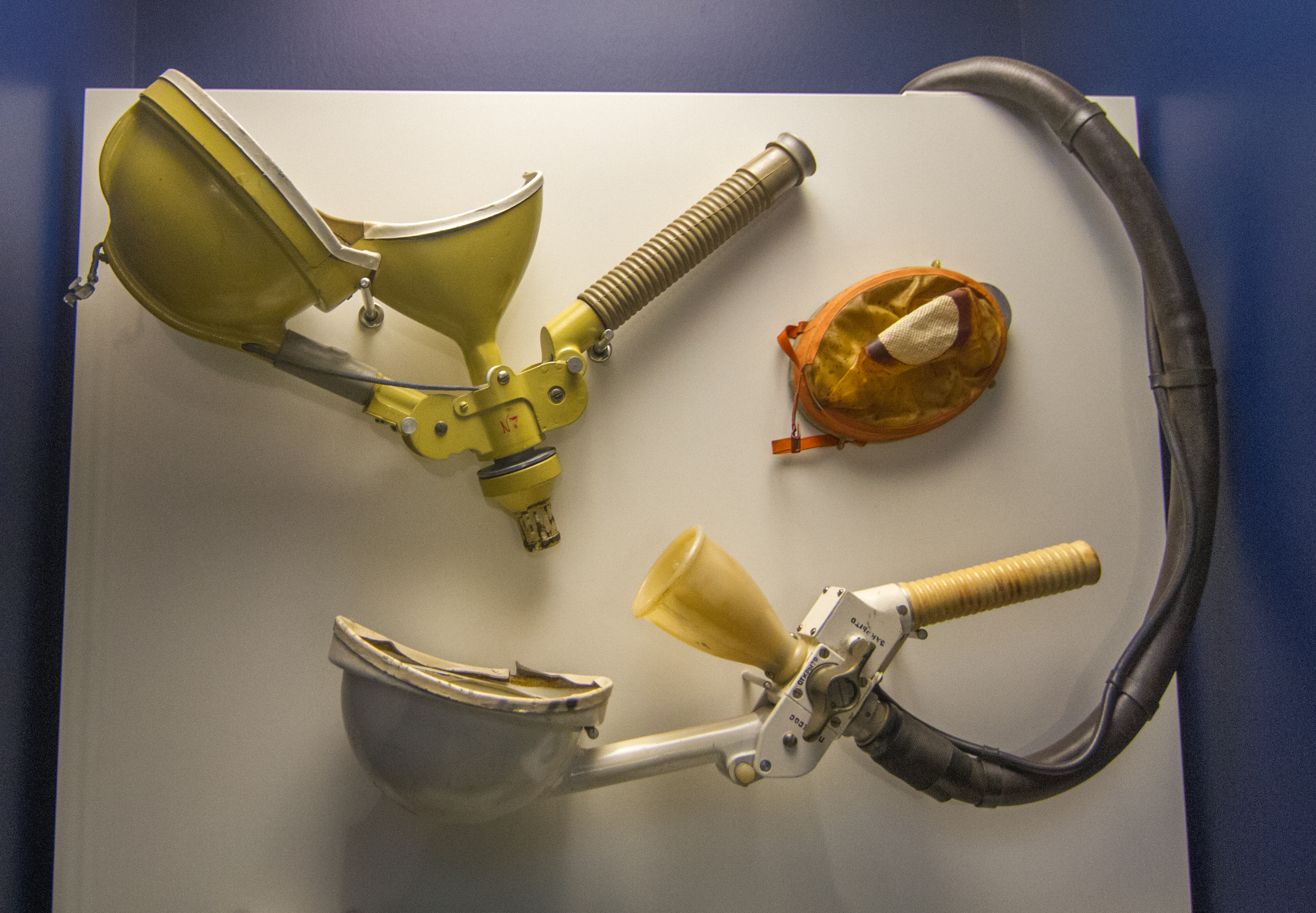
Toilet device on Soyuz spacecraft

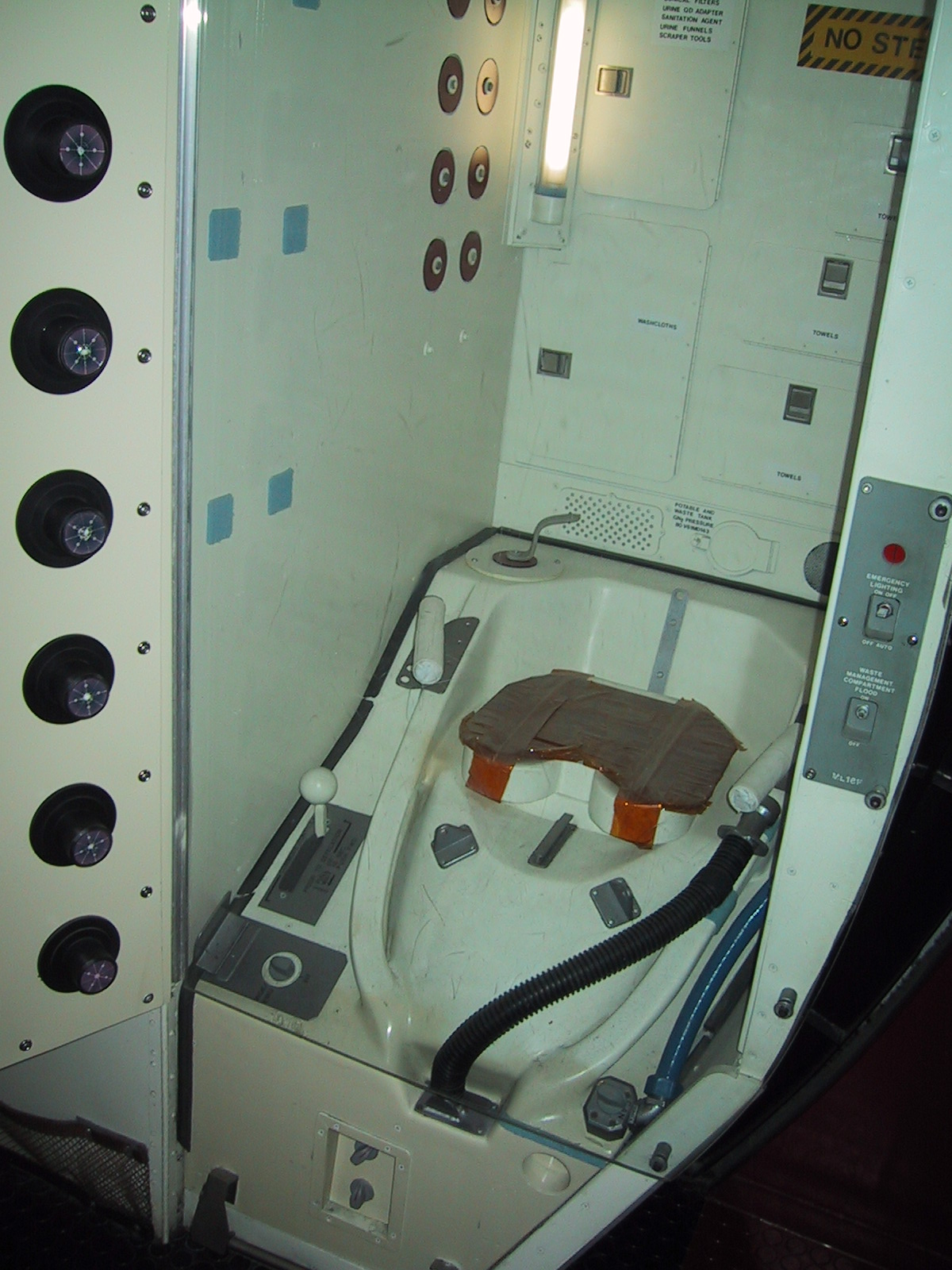
Space Shuttle toilet

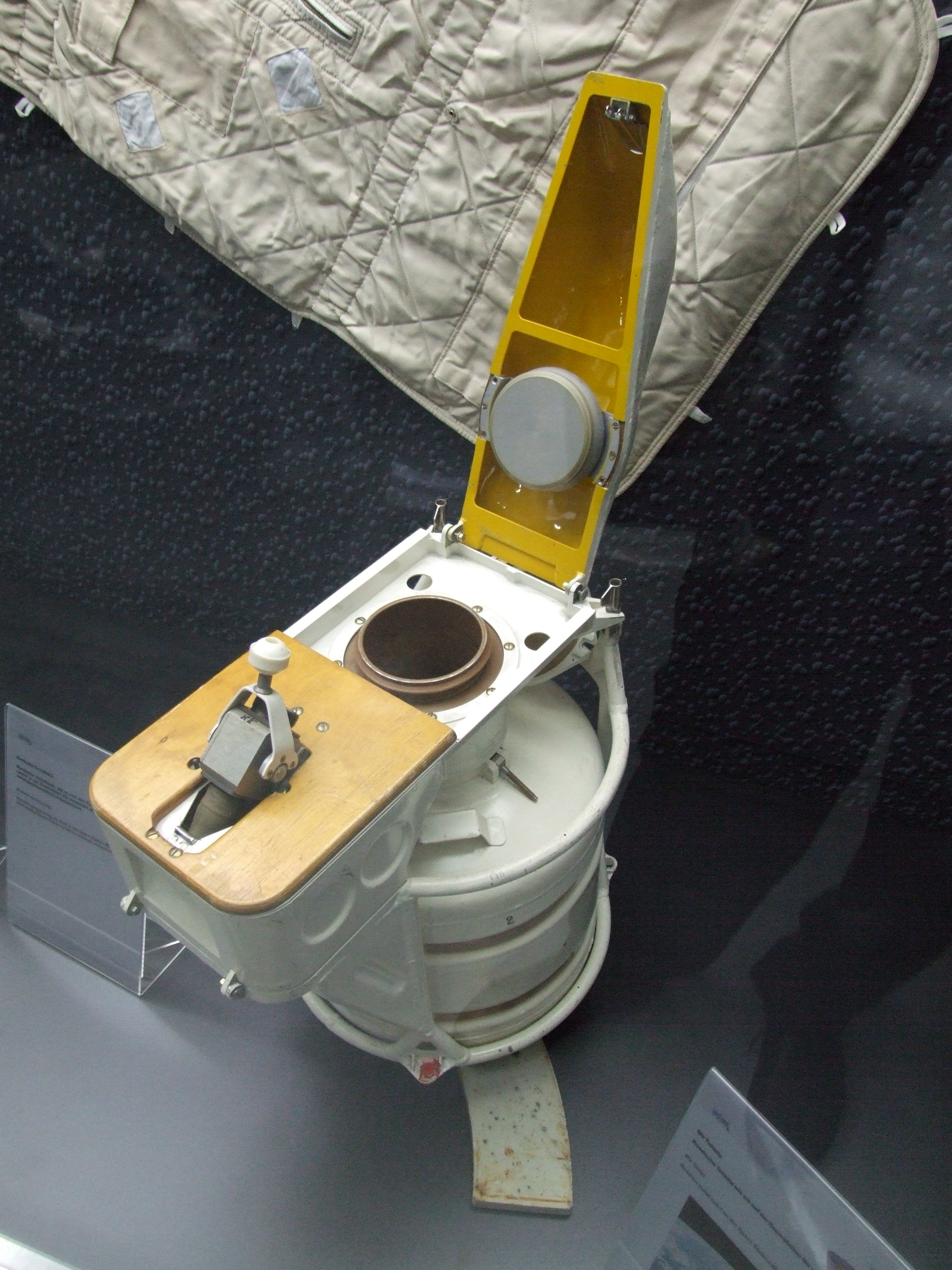
Russian space toilet used in space station Mir

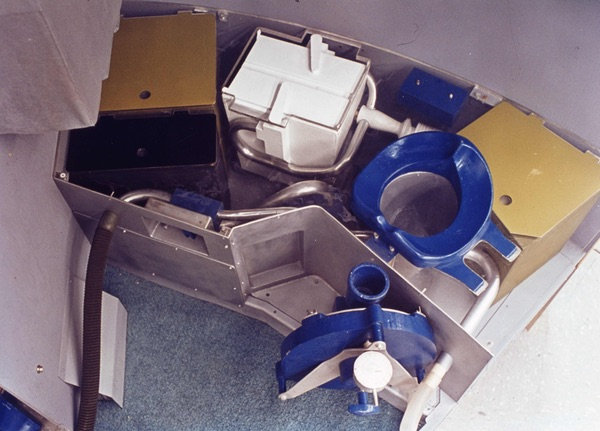
A mockup of the toilet that would be carried on MOL

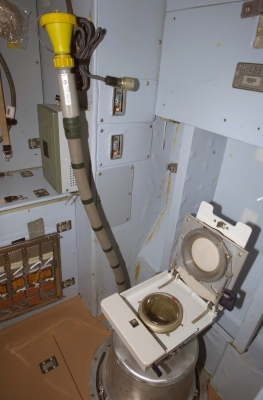
Zero-gravity toilet on the International Space Station in the Zvezda Service Module

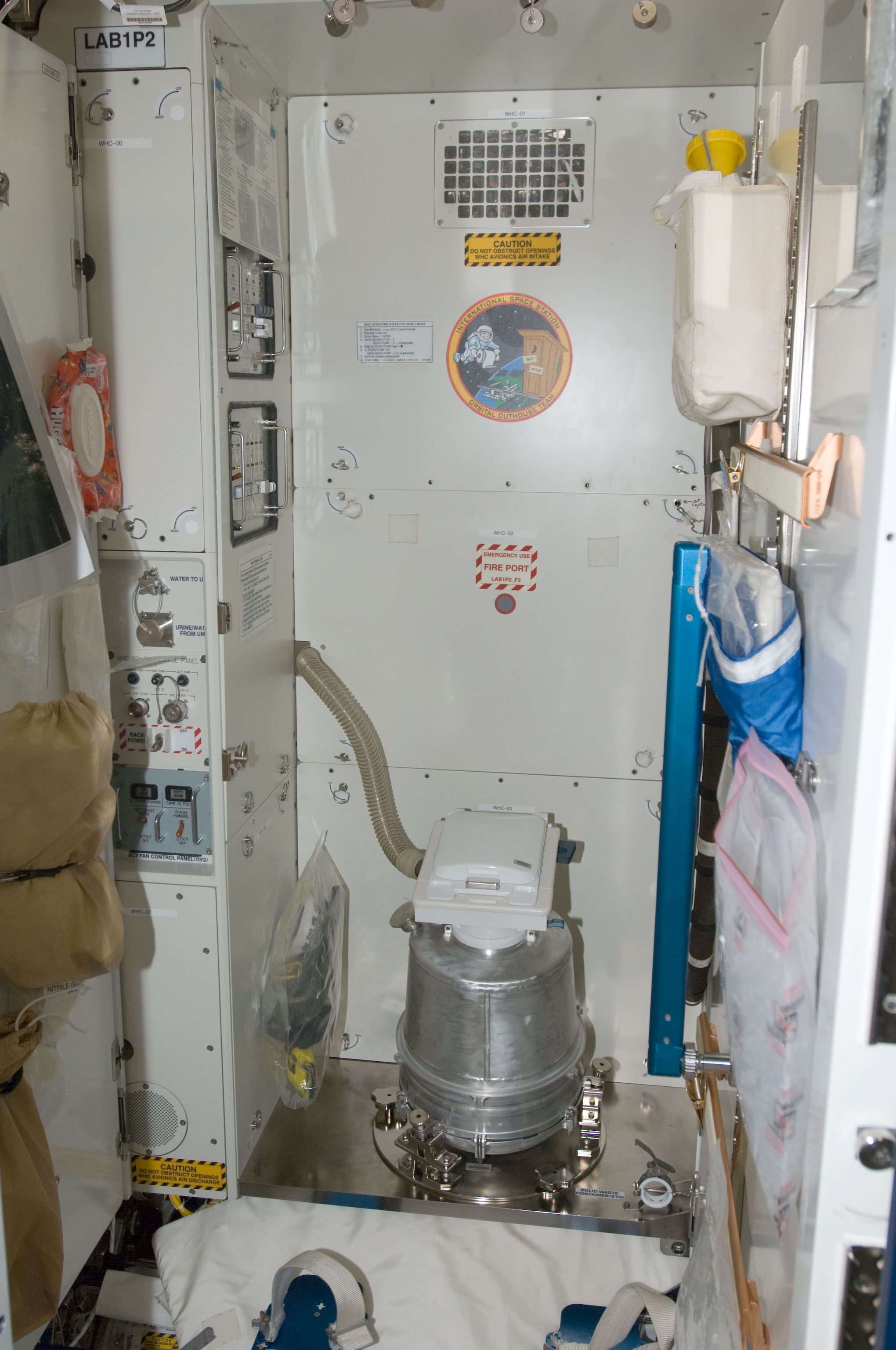
Space toilet inside Node 3, after relocation from the US lab

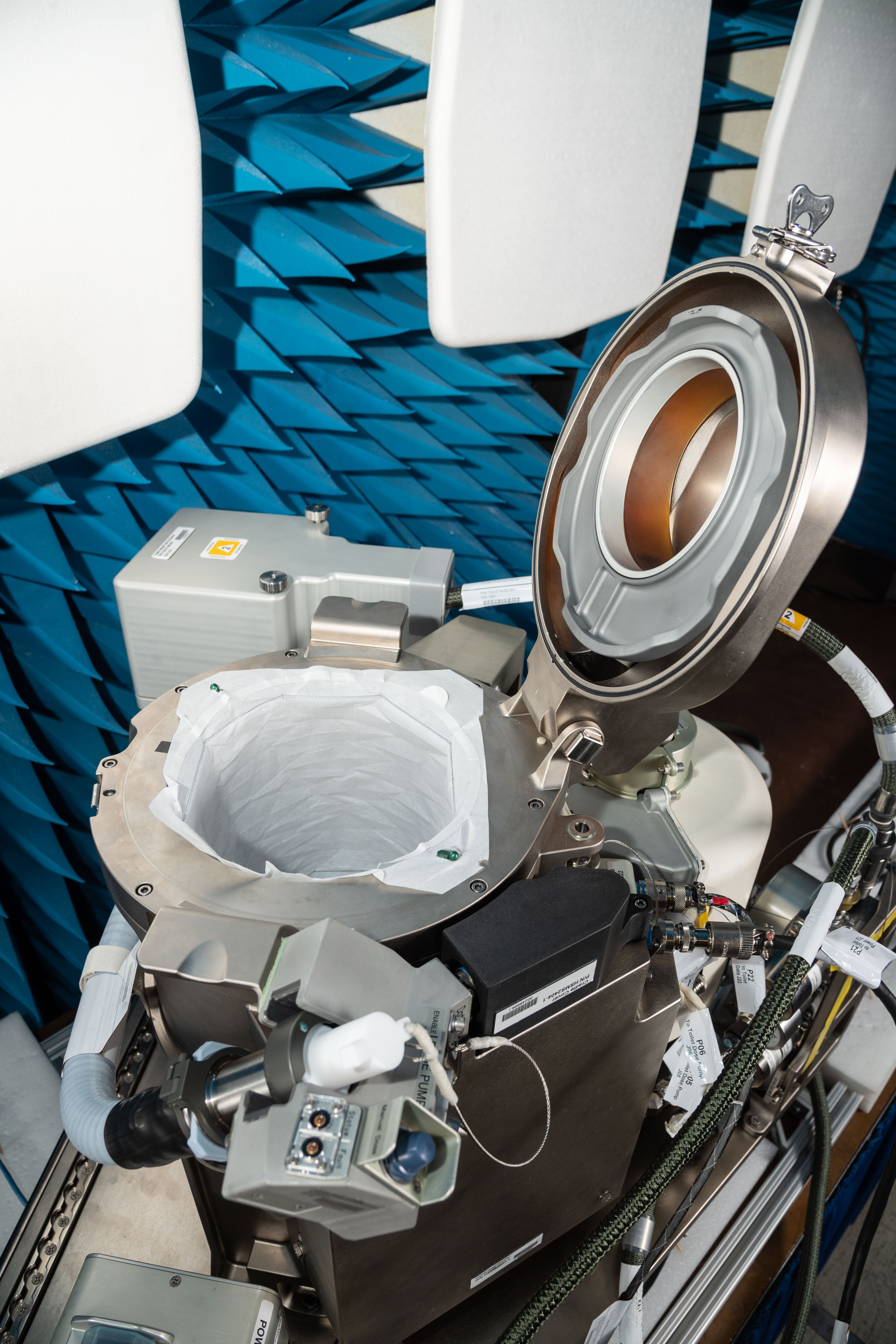
ISS Universal Waste Management System

== See also ==
- Maximum Absorbency Garment
- Head (watercraft)
- Space Poop Challenge
- Vacuum toilet
