= List of economic prizes =

List of economic prizes may refer to:

- List of challenge awards or inducement prices
- List of prizes known as the Nobel or the highest honors of a field#Economics
