= Ingenia Technology =

International security technology company formed in 2003

- Company type: Public
- Industry: Brand Protection, Track and Trace, Document Authentication
- Founded: 2003
- Headquarters: London, UK
- Number of employees: 15
- Website: www.ingeniatechnology.com

Ingenia Technology, formed in 2003, is an international security technology company and inventor of Laser Surface Authentication, a technique used for brand protection, track and trace and document authentication.

== History ==
Ingenia Technology was founded following years of research funding at Durham University and Imperial College in London. Under the leadership of Professor Russell Cowburn, the Laser Surface Authentication technology that forms the basis of the security solution was developed. Ingenia Technology has its headquarters in London with satellite offices in Vienna and Zurich.

== Technology ==
Laser Surface Authentication analyses the naturally occurring random structure of a surface and from this, generates a signature or code unique to that surface. This code can then be used to authenticate and identify the item in the same way as a fingerprint. The technology can be used for paper, cardboard, plastics, metals and ceramics, and has found many applications across a diverse number of markets.

== Awards ==
The company has won many technology and company awards in recent years including:

- Global Security Challenge Winner 2006 – Best New Security Technology in the World
- Hermes Award 2007 – Best Technology together with Bayer Technology Services
- Red Herring Europe 100 and Red Herring Global 100 Winners 2007 – Emerging Technology Companies
