= Peugeot Concours Design =

- Description: Biennial international car design competition
- Country: France
- Presented by: Peugeot

The Peugeot Concours Design competition was a biennial competition run by the French car manufacturer Peugeot. For each competition, entrants had to submit their designs for a car. A model of the winning design was built by the Peugeot Styling Centre and unveiled at the Frankfurt Motor Show. The last competition took place in 2008.

== History ==
The first contest took place in 2000-2001, with the theme "2020", a challenge to design a Peugeot car for the year 2020. The contest was announced at the Paris Motor Show in 2000, and culminated in the winning design being built by Peugeot, and unveiled at the Frankfurt Motor Show in 2001. Since then, the contest has followed a similar schedule every two years. For the 2006-2007 contest, the winning design featured in an Xbox 360 game.

== Themes ==
Each contest has a theme, which contestants must follow when creating their designs:

- 2000-2001 "2020" - a concept car for the year 2020
- 2002-2003 "Retrofuturism"
- 2004-2005 "Design the Peugeot you dream of seeing in the near future"
- 2006-2007 "P.L.E.A.S.E." - stands for Pleasurable (to drive), Lively, Efficient, Accessible, Simple, Ecological
- 2008-2009 "Imagine the Peugeot in the worldwide megalopolis of tomorrow"

== Rules ==
The contest runs to a similar schedule, with similar rules, each year. In 2008, the contest opened in June, with the deadline for submissions on July 20. When the deadline for submissions has passed, Peugeot selects 30 entries to go forward to the next stage. These 30 entries are placed on the competition's website and are voted on by visitors to the site and selected industry and press figures. Based on these votes, these 30 entries are narrowed down to ten entries and these entries are posted to the website. This stage is not a majority vote - the ten entries which are selected may not be the highest-voted entries.

In the final stage of voting, the Peugeot Jury select the winner and 2nd and 3rd runners-up from the final ten. The results of this are then posted to the competition's website, usually some time in February.

=== Prizes ===
In the 2008-2009 contest, the prize structure will be as follows:

==== 1st place ====
- €10,000
- Xbox 360 console
- "La Griffe" trophy, presented at the Geneva Motor Show
- A 1:43 scale model of the previous contest's winning entry, made by Norev to be sold as merchandise
- Construction of a full-scale model of the winning entry to be entered in two auto shows (see below)
- Inclusion of their design in a forthcoming Xbox 360 game
- Accommodation and expenses to attend the two motor shows
- Entry to the Shanghai Motor Show 2009
- Entry to the Mondial de Paris 2008

==== 2nd place ====
- €2,500
- Xbox 360 console
- A 1:43 scale model of the previous contest's winning entry

==== 3rd place ====
- €1,500
- Xbox 360 console
- A 1:43 scale model of the previous contest's winning entry

==== 4th-10th place ====
- €1,000
- A 1:43 scale model of the previous contest's winning entry

==== 11th-30th place ====
- €300

== Winners ==
=== 2000-2001 ===
The winner of the 2000-2001 competition was Moonster by Marko Lukovic. The concept behind this design was that the vehicle should be totally original. It features a wheel-level engine with a raised central compartment capable of seating two people.

=== 2002-2003 ===
This contest, themed "Retrofuturism", was won by Stefan Schulze with 4002. With this design, the artist intended to make the car look like a typical Peugeot. Many commentators felt that he was successful with this, citing the design of the headlights as particularly Peugeot-like.

=== 2004-2005 ===
This contest was won by André Costa with Moovie. His was a bubble-shaped 2-door, 2-seat city car, almost totally enclosed by glass. The creator has stated that the car was designed to be environmentally friendly and ideal for use in cities.

=== 2006-2007 ===
The 2006-2007 competition was won by Mihai Panaitescu with his design, Flux. According to its creator, the car is intended to be sporty and versatile, and able to handle many different environments with ease. Flux is meant to symbolise "the continuous change and flow of our daily lives during work and play" - to this end, the car contains an integrated Xbox 360 console.

== See also ==
- List of motor vehicle awards
- Automotive design
- Paris Motor Show
- Geneva Motor Show
- Frankfurt Motor Show
- Peugeot
- Inducement prize contest
