= Peugeot Moonster =

Peugeot concept vehicle

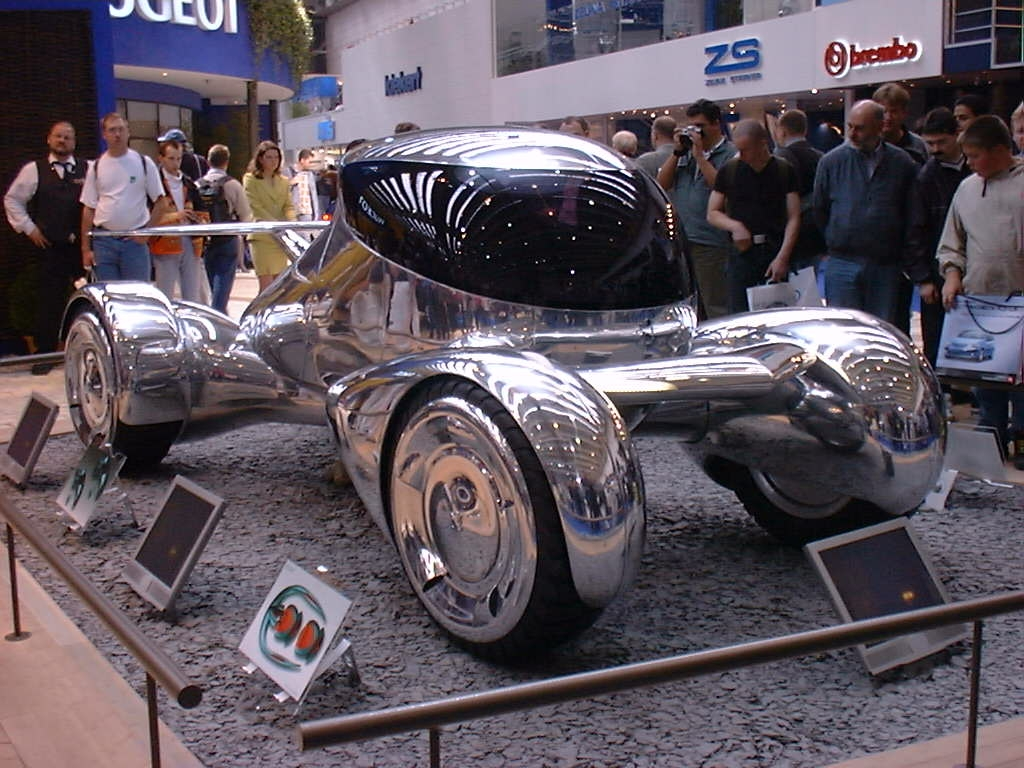
- 2001 Peugeot Moonster on display

Overview
- Manufacturer: Peugeot
- Production: 2001
- Designer: Marko Lukovic

Body and chassis
- Body style: 2-door coupe

Dimensions
- Wheelbase: ~3,000 mm (120 in)
- Length: ~4,000 mm (160 in)
- Width: ~1,950 mm (77 in)
- Height: ~1,650 mm (65 in)

The Peugeot Moonster is a two-door lunar rover-inspired coupe concept revealed by French automobile manufacturer Peugeot at the 2001 International Motor Show Germany as the winner of the 2000 Peugeot Concours Design competition.

== Overview ==
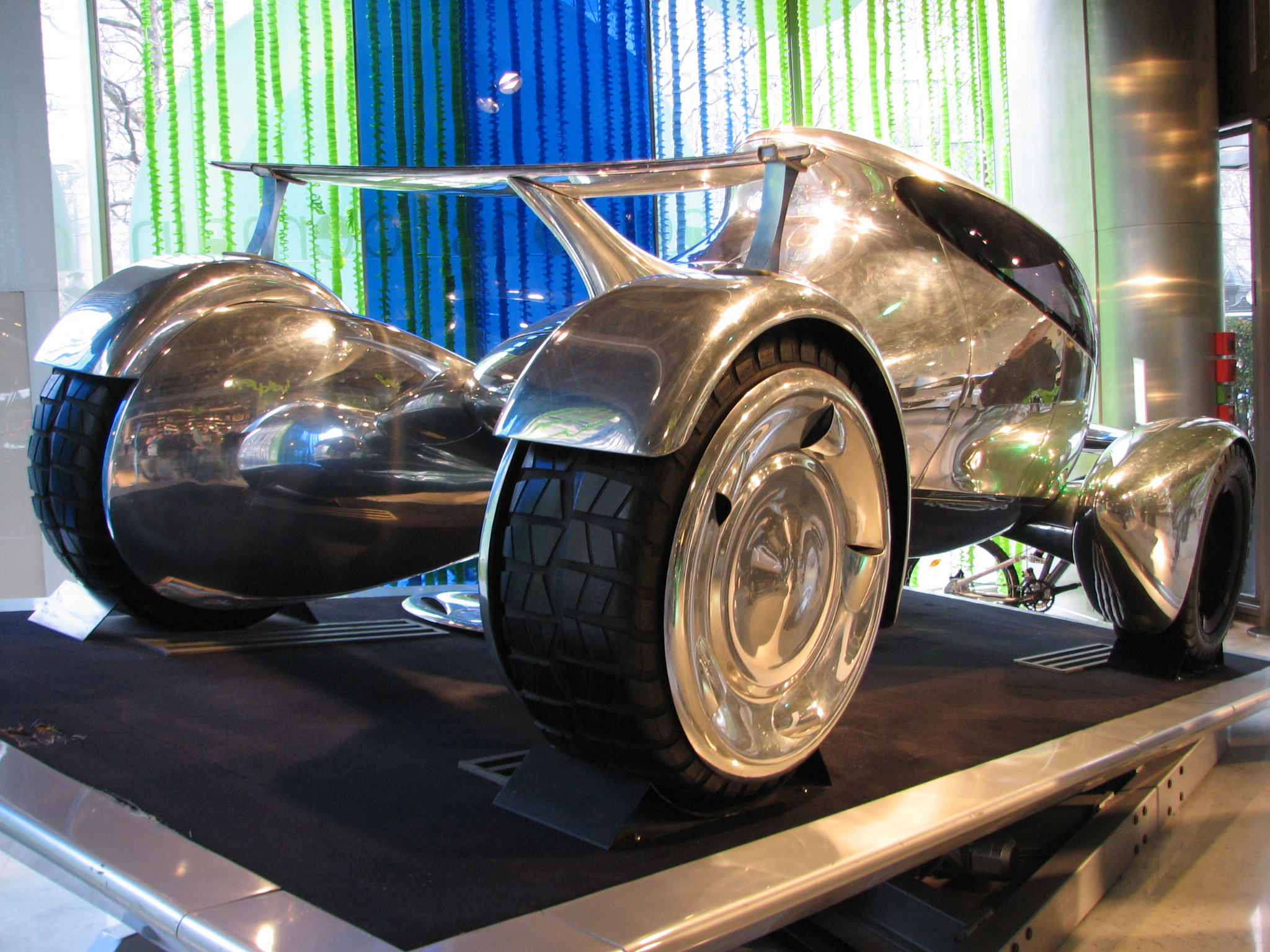
2001 Peugeot Moonster in the Avenue des Champs-Elysées Peugeot showroom in Paris, France (rear)

The Peugeot Moonster concept was revealed at International Motor Show Germany on September 11, 2001, in Frankfurt, Germany. The car was the winner of the 1st biennial Peugeot Concours Design concept car design competition held in 2000, where the objective was to design a theoretical car for 2020. The Moonster was designed by 23-year-old Serbian university of implied arts student Marko Lukovic, who received a cheque for €5,000 (US$5,800) as a prize for his design.

== Design ==
In the design of the Peugeot Moonster, the engine is located at wheel level. Its design is inspired by cars of 2020 and the early 1900s, as well as lunar rovers and dolphins, in which the rear spoiler is in the shape of a dolphin tail. The body of the Moonster is made from polished aluminum sheets, which were formed into curves, giving a chrome appearance to the car. The interior has four seats and an aircraft-like steering wheel.
