= Global Security Challenge =

International competition for security technology startups and innovations

- Founded: 2006
- Founder: MBA students of London Business School
- Type: Competition / Event Organizer
- Headquarters: London, United Kingdom
- Region served: Worldwide
- Owner: InnoCentive
- Parent organization: InnoCentive
- Website: globalsecuritychallenge.com

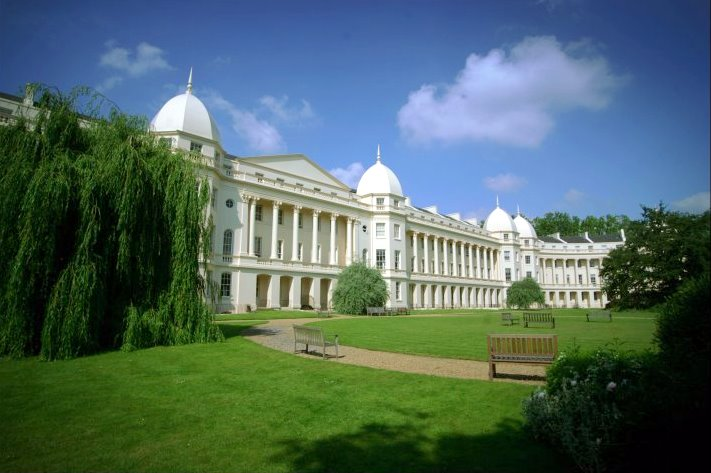
The GSC was founded by MBA students of London Business School in spring 2006

The Global Security Challenge runs international business plan competitions to find and select the most promising security technology startups in the world. The GSC holds regional selection events and a Security Summit in London to bring together innovators with government, industry and investors. The GSC belongs to InnoCentive, which acquired the original owner OmniCompete in 2012. OmniCompete also launched the Energy Storage Challenge in 2010.

== History ==
The GSC was founded by MBA students of London Business School in the spring of 2006; the first competition took place in the summer of 2006. By 2007, the Technical Support Working Group, an interagency group of the US Government, sponsored the annual grant award of $500,000 Dollar for the winning security startup. The GSC runs regional finals in Singapore at the National University of Singapore, in Washington DC at The University of Maryland and Brussels at the Brussels School of International Studies ahead of the GSC London Security Summit in autumn, hosted by London Business School.

== Past competitions' winners and finalists ==
GSC finalists and winners from the last three annual competitions have subsequently raised over $117 million in new venture funding and grants. The top-selected startups have also secured large contracts with government clients, such as the US Department of Energy, the US Navy and the US Department of Defense, as well as with industry behemoths, such as Siemens and Bayer AG from Germany. One regional finalist in 2007, TenCube, recently got acquired by McAfee and the cyber 2009 winner Ksplice was acquired in July 2011 by Oracle.

=== Most Promising Security Start-Up of the Year ===
- Start-Up Winner from 2006: Ingenia Technology (UK)
- Start-Up Winner from 2007: NoblePeak Vision (USA)
- Start-Up Winner from 2008: TRX Systems (USA)
- Start-Up Winner from 2009: Adaptive Imaging Technologies (Israel)
- Start-Up Winner from 2010: mPedigree (Ghana)
- Start-Up Winner from 2011: Arktis Radiation Detectors Ltd (Switzerland)
- Start-Up Winner from 2012: SQR Systems Ltd (UK)

=== Most Promising Security Idea of the Year ===
- Best Security Idea 2008: Homergent Inc (USA)
- Best Security Idea 2009: Remedium Technologies (USA)

=== Crowded Places Challenge winners ===
- Best Crowded Places Security Idea 2008: Crowd-Vision (Switzerland)
- Best Crowded Places Security Idea 2009: iOmniscient (Australia)

=== Other competition categories ===
- Winner of Cyber Security Challenge 2009: Ksplice (USA)
- Winner of Cyber Security Challenge 2010: Masking Networks (USA)
- Winner of Cloud Security Challenge 2010: CloudSwitch (USA)
- Security SME of the Year 2009: Kromek (UK)
- Security SME of the Year 2010: iwebgate (Australia/UK)
- Security SME of the Year 2011: Agnitio (Spain)

== Judges ==
The members of the GSC Judging Committees are leaders from venture capital funds, government, universities and industry.

=== Government ===
- Defence Science & Technology Agency (Singapore Government)
- Home Office (UK Government)
- UK Ministry of Defence (Counter Terrorism Science & Technology Centre)
- National Science Foundation
- Technical Support Working Group (TSWG) - US Department of Defense
- Office of Naval Research - ONR Global

=== Venture capital ===
- Kleiner Perkins Caufield & Byers
- Advent Venture Partners
- 3V SourceOne Capital
- Cap Vista
- NovakBiddle Venture Partners
- Paladin Capital Group
- PegasusBridge Fund Management Limited
- Redshift Ventures
- SAIC Venture Capital Corp.
- Siemens Venture Capital

=== University ===
- London Business School
- Mississippi State University
- National University of Singapore
- UnternehmerTum (Technical University of Munich)
- University of Kent
- University of Maryland, College Park

=== Industry ===
- Accenture
- BAE Systems
- Booz Allen Hamilton
- Barclays Bank
- Bosch
- BWI-IT (IBM, Siemens & German Armed Forces)
- IBM
- MITRE
- SemCorp Industries
- Smiths Detection

== Events ==
The GSC hosts several regional Semi-Finals and one Grand Final (Summit) at leading research universities around the world:

- University of Maryland, College Park
- Northwestern University
- National University of Singapore
- University of Kent
- London Business School is the host of the annual GSC Security Summit. The 5th annual GSC Security Summit occurred on November 11+12 2010 in London.

== See also ==
- List of general science and technology awards
- Best of Biotech
- DARPA Grand Challenge

== Sources ==
- United States Department of State
- http://www.iht.com/articles/2007/11/26/business/invent.php
- https://www.msstate.edu/web/media/detail.php?id=3904
