= Peugeot Moovie =

Peugeot concept vehicle

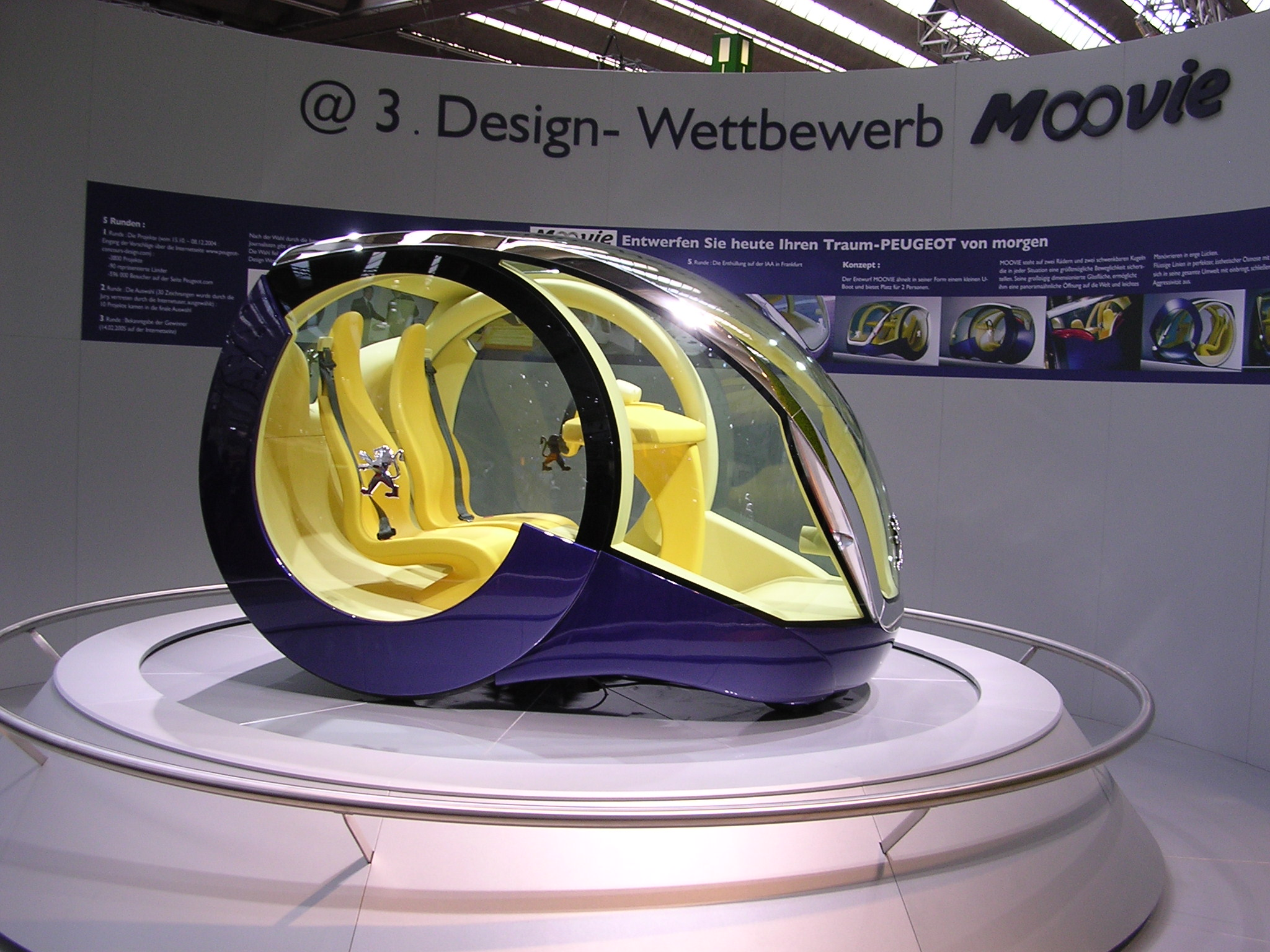
- Peugeot Moovie at the 2005 International Motor Show Germany

Overview
- Manufacturer: Peugeot
- Production: 2005
- Designer: André Costa

Body and chassis
- Class: City car (A)
- Body style: 2-door quadricycle

Dimensions
- Length: ~2,330 mm (92 in)
- Width: ~1,800 mm (71 in)
- Height: ~1,540 mm (61 in)
- Curb weight: ~500 kg (1,100 lb)

The Peugeot Moovie is a 2-door city car concept revealed by French automobile manufacturer Peugeot at the 2005 International Motor Show Germany as the winner of the 2004 Peugeot Concours Design competition.

== Overview ==
The Peugeot Moovie concept was revealed at International Motor Show Germany on September 12, 2005 in Frankfurt, Germany. It is a 2-door, 2-seat city car and was the winner of the 3rd biennial Peugeot Concours Design concept car design competition held in 2004. The Moovie, intended to be an environmentally-friendly car, was designed by 23-year-old Portuguese university student André Costa.

== Design ==
=== Exterior ===
The overall shape of the Peugeot Moovie is round and the car is almost fully enclosed with glass, with it being held together by a chrome trim along the panoramic windshield, which extends to the rear, and navy blue body panels on the sides and rear. On the side door windows and front windshield are large Peugeot lion badges.

=== Interior ===
The interior of the Moovie concept is large and open compared to other city cars. The interior has two yellow seats and a steering column both made from plastic and beige padding. The cabin features soft, lines paired with vibrant yellow pigments and beige padding. It accommodates two people on minimalist, one-piece bucket seats built from epoxy half-shells on a steel chassis. Notably, the seatbelts are integrated directly into the on-board seat structures.
