= Space Poop Challenge =

Space toilet design contest

External videos
- Space Poop Challenge video from Astronaut Richard Mastracchio

The Space Poop Challenge was a 2016 contest sponsored by NASA for new designs of space toilet systems for use in space suits.

The contest requests "proposed solutions for fecal, urine, and menstrual management systems to be used in the crew’s launch and entry suits over a continuous duration of up to 144 hours".

The contest was won by Dr. Thatcher Cardon.

== See also ==
- Space toilet
- Maximum Absorbency Garment
