= H-Prize =

Series of inducement prizes

The H-Prize program is a series of inducement prizes intended to encourage research into the use of hydrogen as an energy carrier in a hydrogen economy. The program is sponsored by the United States Department of Energy and administered by the Hydrogen Education Foundation. In 2014, an H-Prize competition was launched to develop a small-scale hydrogen generation and refueling station for hydrogen fuel cell electric vehicles. The prize, named the H2 Refuel H-Prize and worth $1 million, was awarded in January 2017, to the consortium "SimpleFuel".

== Creation ==
Legislation for the prize, introduced by Rep. Bob Inglis, passed the United States House of Representatives in May 2006 as H.R. 5143, but did not receive a vote in the United States Senate. After being reintroduced by Rep. Dan Lipinski at the beginning of a new term in January 2007, it was eventually folded into the Energy Independence and Security Act of 2007, which passed both the House of Representatives and the Senate and was then signed into law in December 2007.

The bill authorized $50 million in prize money, for the period from fiscal year 2008 to fiscal year 2017. However, in order to be spent, these funds must also be included in Congress's annual appropriation bills. The law provides for three categories of prizes:

- Four prizes of up to $1 million, awarded every two years for advances in hydrogen production, storage, distribution and utilization;
- One prize of up to $4 million, awarded two years to working prototypes of hydrogen vehicles which meet ambitious performance goals; and
- A $10 million grand prize, awarded only once during the program for a major technological breakthrough.

In October 2008, the Hydrogen Education Foundation of Washington, D.C. was selected to administer the H-Prize along with SCRA, a South Carolina research foundation.

== Prizes ==
In August 2009, the Office of Energy Efficiency and Renewable Energy (EERE) Fuel Cell Technologies Office (FCTO) of the U.S. Department of Energy announced a $1 million prize for innovative hydrogen storage materials which was to be awarded in February 2011. However, the prize was never awarded as no competitor met the competition requirements.

In March 2014, EERE FCTO announced plans for a $1 million H2 Refuel H-Prize, and the Prize competition was launched in October 2014. The competition focused on developing small hydrogen refueling stations that can generate hydrogen from electricity or natural gas and dispense it to vehicles at least 1 kg at a time. The winner, SimpleFuel, was announced in January 2017, after building a prototype system and successfully completing the testing period. SimpleFuel was a consortium of three companies, PDC Machines, Ivys, Inc, and McPhy Energy North America.

== See also ==
- Hydrogen economy
- Hydrogen fuel
