= John W. Douglass =

United States Air Force general

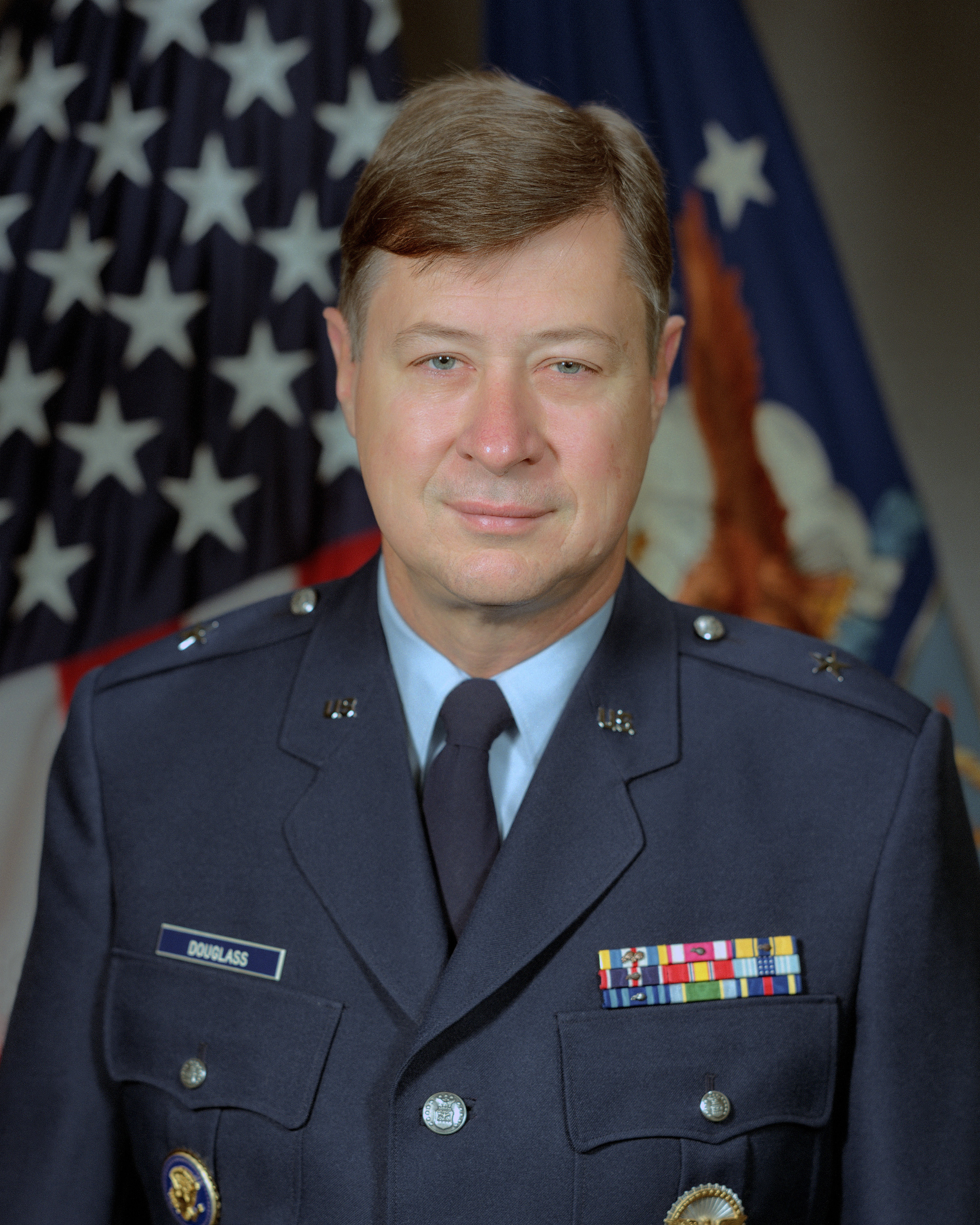
- Brigadier General John W. Douglass
- Born: May 2, 1941 (age 85); Miami, Florida, U.S.
- Military career
- Allegiance: United States of America
- Branch: United States Air Force
- Service years: 1963–1992
- Rank: Brigadier General
- Conflicts: Vietnam War; Gulf War
- Awards: Def. Superior Service Medal; Meritorious Service Medal; Air Force Commendation Medal

John Wade Douglass (born May 2, 1941) is a retired Brigadier General, United States Air Force. He served as the United States Navy's Assistant Secretary of the Navy (Research, Development and Acquisitions) from 1995 to 1998. In 2012, Douglass ran for election to the United States House of Representatives for Virginia's 5th congressional district as a Democrat, losing to incumbent congressman Robert Hurt.

== Early life and education ==
Douglass was born on May 2, 1941, in Miami, Florida.

Douglass earned an associate of arts degree in 1961 and a bachelor of science degree in engineering in 1963, both from the University of Florida. He earned a master of science degree in industrial engineering from Texas Tech University in 1967 and a master of science degree in management science from Fairleigh Dickinson University in 1972. Douglass has done postgraduate work at the Cornell University Center for International Studies, where he was an Air Force research fellow with the peace studies program.

== Military career ==
During his time at the University of Florida, he joined the Air Force Reserve Officer Training Corps, and upon graduating, he joined the United States Air Force and was posted to Norton Air Force Base, where he worked as a production officer for the LGM-25C Titan II intercontinental ballistic missile.

He was then posted to Mactan Air Base in the Philippines as base procurement officer. In 1968, he was posted to the F. E. Warren Air Force Base. The next year, he was appointed deputy chief of the Defense Contract Administration Office for Curtiss-Wright, where he worked with the Navy nuclear propulsion program and various Air Force jet engine overhaul programs. He attended Fairleigh Dickinson University in this period, receiving an M.S. in Management Science in 1972. In 1973, he became a procurement officer at the Eastern Range at Patrick Air Force Base.

In 1975, he joined the staff of Chief of Staff of the United States Air Force David Charles Jones as a procurement officer, and later served in a procurement capacity in the Program Management Assistance Group at Air Force Systems Command at Andrews Air Force Base. In 1977, he was named deputy program manager for business and acquisition of the Joint Cruise Missile Project in Crystal City, Virginia.

Douglass spent 1980-81 doing postgraduate work at Cornell University.

He was named special assistant to the Under Secretary of Defense for Research and Engineering in Washington, D. C. in 1981. He joined the United States National Security Council in 1984 as director of defense programs, where he was responsible for the president's strategic modernization program, Department of Defense research and development issues, weapon system acquisition issues, and management and execution of certain high technology programs. In March 1988, he became director of program planning and integration, and acting director of science and technology in the Office of the Assistant Secretary of the Air Force for Acquisition.

In August 1989, he became deputy U.S. military representative to the NATO Military Committee in Brussels, Belgium. In this capacity, Douglass was the highest ranking U.S. military official at NATO and was directly responsible to the chairman of the Joint Chiefs of Staff.

Douglass retired from the United States Air Force in 1992, having attained the rank of Brigadier General.

== Post-military career ==
Following his retirement from the Air Force, Douglass served as a foreign policy and science and technology advisor to Senator Sam Nunn and served as lead minority staff member for the Senate Armed Services Committee defense conversion and technology reinvestment programs.

Appointed by President Clinton, Douglass served as Assistant Secretary of the Navy (Research, Development and Acquisitions) from November 1995 to August 1998.

From 1998 to 2007, Douglass served as president and CEO of Aerospace Industries Association, an American trade association representing manufacturers and suppliers of civil, military, and business aircraft; helicopters; UAVs; space systems; aircraft engines, materiel, and related components; equipment services; and information technology.

In 2007, Douglass became President and CEO of The Douglass Aerospace Group. During the 2008 Presidential election campaign, Douglass was a member of President Obama's Aerospace and Defense Industry advisors group and campaigned on behalf of the President.

Douglass has lectured in the United States and Europe on aerospace and national security issues and has taught at the Florida Institute of Technology, Cornell University, and the National Defense University. He served on the Commission on the Future of the United States Aerospace Industry, which issued its final report in November 2002.

== Congressional campaign ==
In March 2012, Douglass announced plans to re-file his Congressional campaign in the 5th District to challenge incumbent Republican Congressman Robert Hurt, after Virginia's Republican legislature redrew his home in Fauquier County out of the 10th District. On May 19, Douglass became the official Democratic nominee for United States Congress from Virginia's 5th District. Douglass lost the election to Hurt.

== Personal life ==
Douglass has three sons, one daughter, and two granddaughters. He and his wife, Susan, live in Hume, Virginia.

In the 2024 United States presidential election, Douglass endorsed Kamala Harris.

Government offices
Preceded by Nora Slatkin	Assistant Secretary of the Navy (Research, Development and Acquisitions); November 1995 – August 1998	Succeeded by H. Lee Buchanan III
