= Agnitio =

AGNITIO
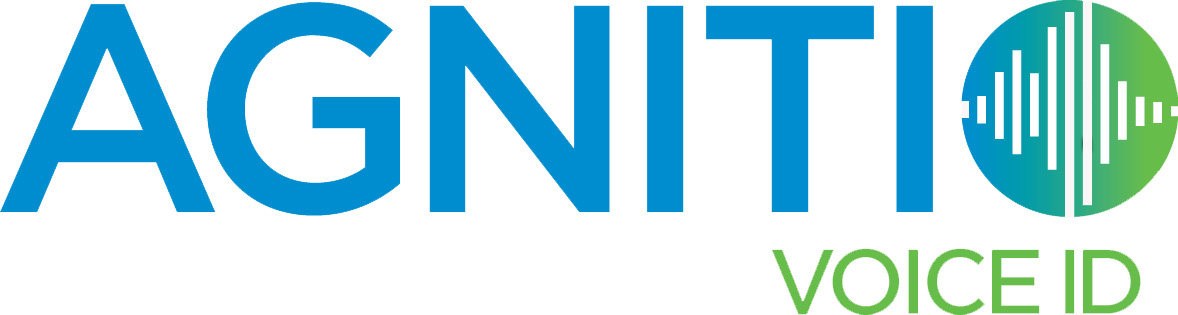
- Type: Acquired
- Industry: Voice Biometrics
- Founded: 2004, Acquired by Nuance Communications Inc.
- Headquarters: Madrid, Spain
- Key people: Emilio Martínez, CEO; Javier Castaño, COO
- Products: ASIS; BS3; BATVOX; KIVOX Verifier
- Number of employees: > 35
- Website: www.agnitio-corp.com

AGNITIO S.L. was a voice biometrics technology company, headquartered in Madrid, Spain. Biometric authentication uses unique biological characteristics to verify an individual’s identity. It's harder to spoof and considered more convenient for some users since they do not have to remember passwords or worry about passwords being stolen. Agnitio provides voice biometrics services for homeland security and corporate clients.

== History ==
=== Origins ===
AGNITIO was founded in 2004 as a spin-off from the Biometric Recognition Group — ATVS at the Technical University of Madrid. Its products are used by police departments in more than 35 countries across Europe, Asia and the Americas. On October 19, 2016, Nuance Communications Inc. acquired Agnitio and then Microsoft acquired Nuance. AGNITIO was acquired by Bigtincan in October 2020.

=== Market expansion ===
In addition to forensic applications, voice biometrics is considered a technology suitable for authentication in telephone and electronic transactions. This makes voice biometrics a technology used in phone and online banking, as well as other corporate voice applications and security needs.

AGNITIO's success in the homeland security market attracted venture capital funding, which was being used to enter deeper into the enterprise/corporate market. KIVOX, AGNITiO's corporate-focused offering, expands upon the inherent benefits of voice biometrics by utilizing the same core technologies found in its homeland security services.

== Technology ==
AGNITIO develops both forensic and real time speaker identification services, such as BATVOX, as well as speaker authentication applications (see Verification vs. identification) that share the same text-independent technology core. In addition, a text-dependent, digit based voice biometric authentication service is offered for corporate implementors.

AGNITIO's core technologies were based on the NIST-evaluated, ATVS biometrics technology, which was transferred to AGNITIO as part of its founding.

== Controversy ==
In 2013, AGNITIO appeared in WikiLeaks Spyfiles as an example of mass surveillance technology used by world intelligence agencies. The event raised doubts about some Agnitio customers.

== See also ==
- Biometrics
- Speaker recognition
