= Peugeot 4002 =

Peugeot 4002 Leon
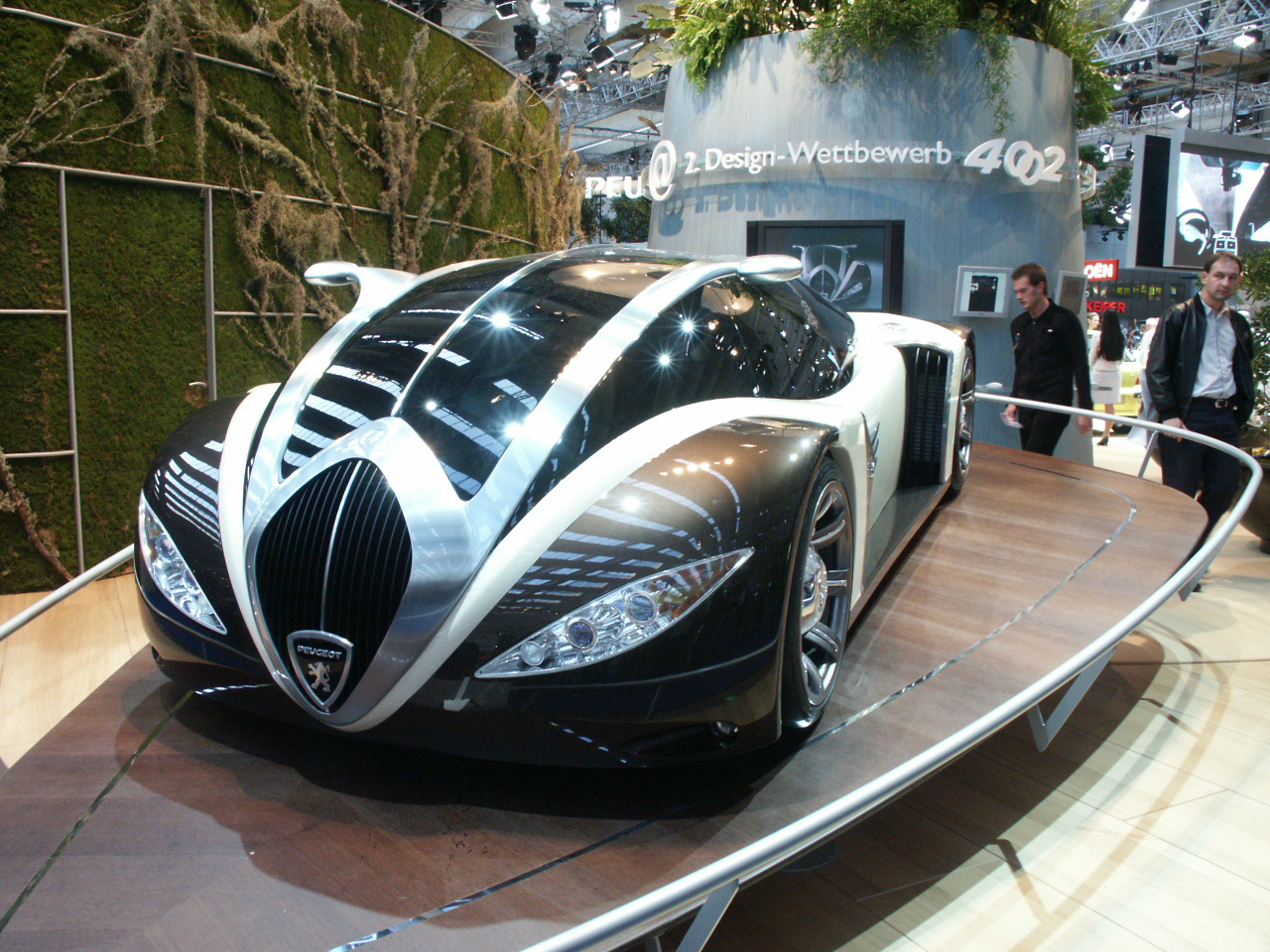
- Front view of the 4002 Leon

Overview
- Manufacturer: Peugeot
- Production: 2003
- Designer: Stefan Schulze

Body and chassis
- Body style: 2-door
- Layout: Rear mid engine, rear wheel drive

Powertrain
- Engine: 6.0L PSA EP9 V12

Dimensions
- Wheelbase: 2,706 mm (106.5 in)
- Length: 4,325 mm (170.3 in)
- Width: 2,028 mm (79.8 in)
- Height: 1,214 mm (47.8 in)

The Peugeot 4002 was a bespoke show car created purely as a stylistic exercise at the behest of Peugeot in 2003.

== Design competition ==
Peugeot introduced a web-based amateur style competition at the 2002 Paris Motor Show, inviting aspiring designers to create a completely unhinged retro-futurist design that incorporated distinct styling features of a historic Peugeot model. A total of 2800 proposals from 90 countries were registered, and Stefan Schulze, a 32-year-old German graphic artist, was selected as the winner. At the 2003 Geneva Motor Show, Schulze was awarded a trophy (La griffe) and €5000, and it was announced that Peugeot would create a full-scale version of the design.

== Creation ==
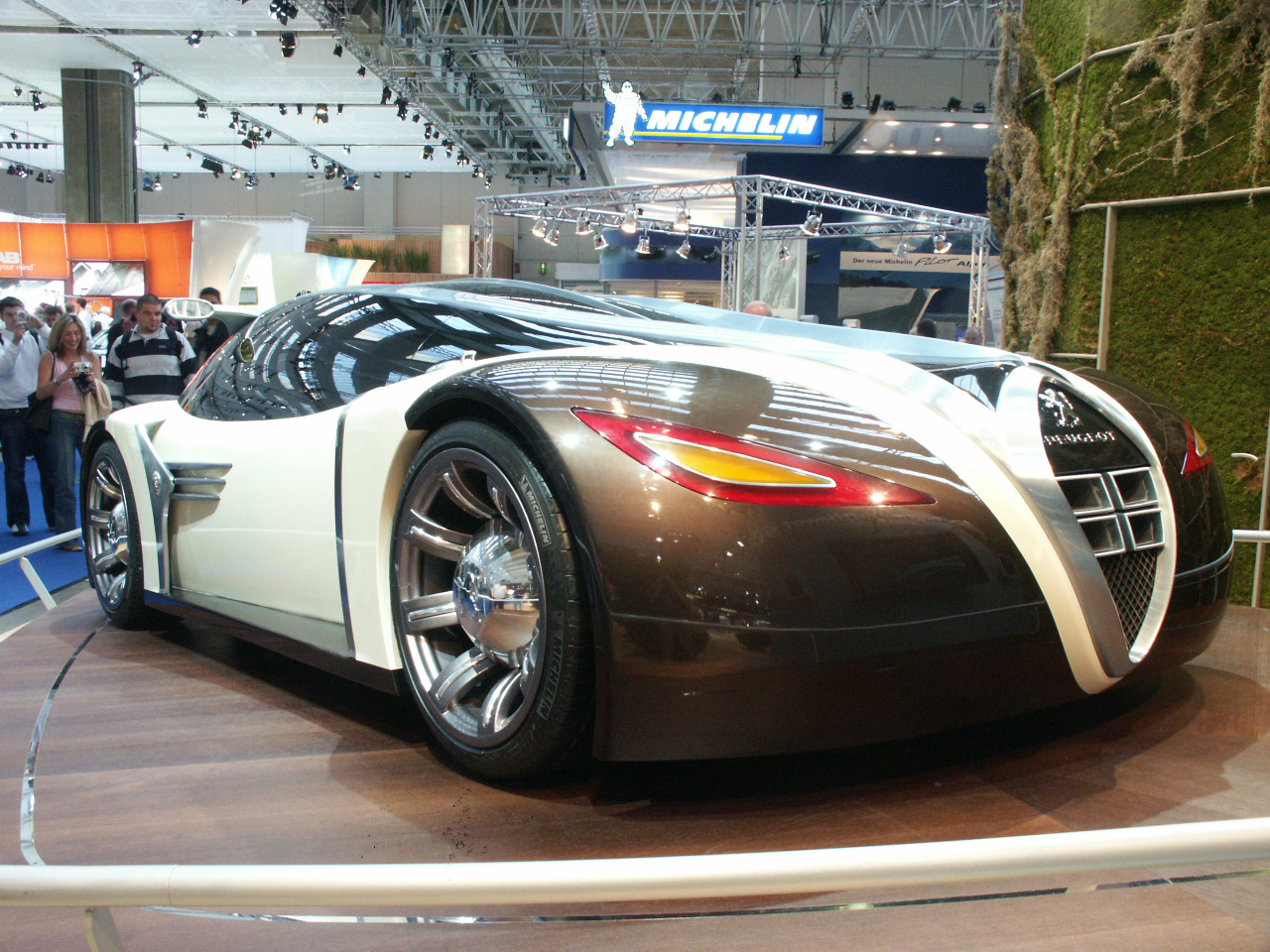
Rear view

The completed design was shown at the 2003 Frankfurt Motor Show. It featured a body of aluminum and fiberglass, and 21-inch wheels. The 4002 incorporated headlights hidden behind the grille itself, as a stylistic nod to the streamlined Peugeot 402 from 1936. As merely a show car, it was not powered and not road-legal. As a styling experiment, the car was considered dynamic, glamorous, and supremely daring, but probably too extreme to predict any real influence on future Peugeot designs.
