= Innovation competition =

An innovation competition is a method or process of the industrial process, product or business development. It is a form of social engineering, which focuses to the creation and elaboration of the best and sustainable ideas, coming from the best innovators.

== Innovation competition research ==
There are few major works, like Terwiesch and Ulrich, who exclusively focus on innovation competitions. They argue, that while innovation is seen as a largely creative endeavor, it can also be rigorously managed by viewing and structuring the innovation process as a collection of “opportunities”. Profitable innovation comes not from increasing investments in R&D, but from systematically identifying more exceptional opportunities. Terwiesch and Ulrich show how to design and run innovation tournaments: pitting competing opportunities against one another, and then consistently filtering out the weakest ones until only those with the highest profit potential remain.

The aims and the design principles of the innovation competitions are noted in the literature as follows:

- Encourage Adidas users to participate in an open innovation process, to inspire their creativity, and to increase the quality of the submissions.
- Constraints are an invaluable tool for fostering creativity.
- Generate innovations, process and product ideas for SAP Research and Development through an IT-supported ideas competition among the SAP UCC Community. The concept aims at providing an interface to SAP Human Resources processes in order to identify the most promising students for VCs.
- Siemens Corporate Technology held an idea competition to help bridge the innovation gap that exists between the different R&D departments and the operational units. The company learnt that idea competitions can be a first step toward more comprehensive innovation processes.
- Innovation competitions are useful in generating radical ideas for the development of new products for the service industry.
- Innovation competitions are sometimes organized by a third party (an intermediator), instead of the focal company or innovator community. Unfortunately, innovation intermediator studies happen also to be a scarce resource. Chesbrough calls innovation brokers 'innovation intermediaries'.

== Examples ==
In September 2009, Netflix awarded 1 million US dollars to the winner of Netflix prize—the team who by 10% improved the accuracy of predictions about the extent that people enjoy a movie based on their past movie preferences.

On Nov. 16, 2010, General Electric will announce the winners of its multimillion-dollar challenge to find new, breakthrough ideas to create cleaner, more efficient and economically viable grid technologies, and to accelerate the adoption of smart grid technologies.

Since 2010, the IXL Innovation Olympics has provided a platform to source breakthrough ideas, for CEOs from Fortune 100 Companies, using teams from MBA, Engineering, Social sciences and other programs across the globe. As an example, IBM used this platform to source breakthrough ideas for increasing accessibility to screens and devices for the aging population.

== See also ==
- Product innovation
- Service innovation
- Social innovation

== Sources ==
- Järvilehto, M., Linna, T., Similä, J., Kuvaja, P. and Oivo M. (2009) Innovation Competitions, in P. Abrahamsson and N. Oza (Eds.): Building Blocks of Agile Innovation. (in press)
- Similä, J., Järvilehto, M., Leppälä, K., Haapasalo, H. and Kuvaja, P. (2009) ‘Modeling and Evaluating Open Innovation as communicative Action’, in F. Piller and M. Tseng (Eds.) Making Customer Centricity Work: Advances in Mass Customization and Personalization, World Scientific Press. (in press)
