= L Prize =

L-Prize
- Description: Spurring development of ultra-efficient LED lighting to replace traditional lamps
- Country: United States
- Presented by: United States Department of Energy (DOE)
- Status: Active (Current phase launched 2021)

The L-Prize competition was designed to spur development of LED light replacements for 60W incandescent lamps and PAR38 halogen lamps as well as an ultra-efficient "21st Century Lamp". It was established by the United States Department of Energy (DOE) as directed by the Energy Independence and Security Act of 2007. The original competition, launched in 2008, focused on an LED replacement for the common 60-watt light bulb and this L-Prize was awarded in 2011. The PAR38 competition was launched but received no entries and was suspended in 2014. The 21st Century Lamp competition was never opened.

The current L-Prize Competition launched in 2021 and targets commercial-sector lighting, which accounts for about 36% of lighting energy use in the United States.

== 2007 L-Prize Competition ==
=== 60W Competition ===
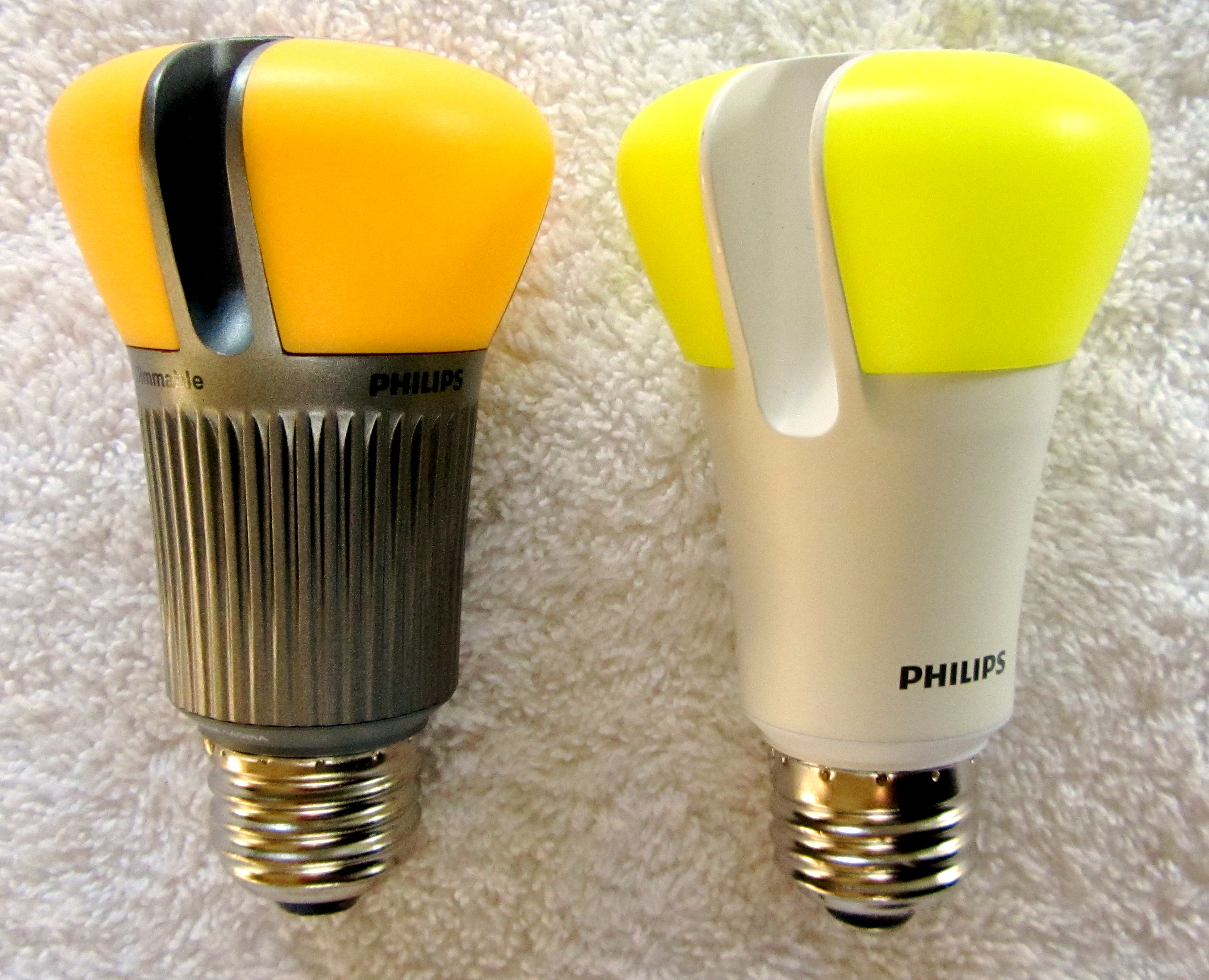
L Prize winning bulb on the right and its technological precursor on the left

The original L-Prize Competition, launched in 2008, sought LED replacements for the common 60-watt light bulb. In late 2009, the L-Prize competition received its first entry, from Philips Lighting North America. The 2,000 samples submitted by Philips went through a rigorous 18-month evaluation that included industry-standard photometric testing, stress testing under extreme conditions, and long-term lumen maintenance testing at elevated temperatures. In addition, field assessments were conducted by L-Prize partners to see how the product performed in real-world settings.

The Philips entry met all requirements and, in August 2011, was declared the L-Prize winner in the 60W replacement category. The product became available in the retail market on April 22, 2012 (Earth Day). The lamp was comparable to a 60W incandescent in color quality (CRI = 93, CCT = 2727 K), light distribution, and light output (940 lumens) but consumed less than 10W (a savings of 83%), and at 25,000 hours of testing, the actual lumen maintenance was 100%, with chromaticity change at less than .002.

=== PAR38 and 21st Century Lamp Competitions ===
The L-Prize competition to develop LED replacements for PAR38 halogen lamps was launched but received no entries and was suspended in 2014. The 21st Century Lamp competition was never opened.

== 2021 L-Prize Competition ==
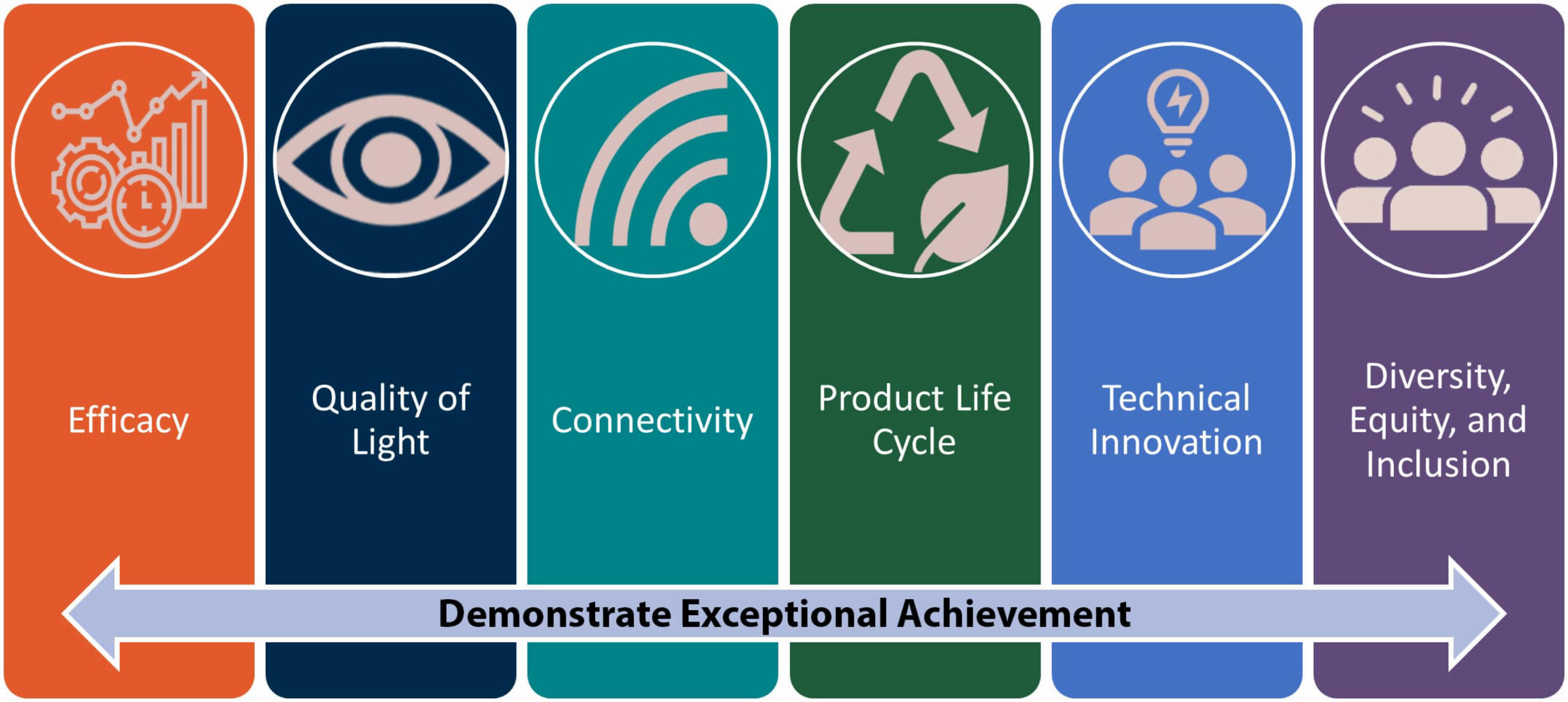
L-Prize winners must demonstrate exceptional achievement across all areas.

The goal of the new L-Prize is to spur development of next-generation LED lighting systems for commercial buildings. Challenging technical requirements put in place by DOE are intended to stimulate creative approaches that would raise the bar for efficacy, quality of light, connectivity, and life cycle environmental impact. In addition to technical innovation, the L-Prize encourages entrants to address diversity, equity, and inclusion (DEI) in the business practice, the supply chain, or other areas where they can effect change through the core business model and operations. The current L-Prize seeks interoperable lighting systems that demonstrate exceptional achievement in all areas.

The current L-Prize has three distinct phases, and competitors can enter any or all phases.

=== Concept Phase ===
The L-Prize Concept Phase invited innovative concept proposals documenting a luminaire and lighting system of the future. The Concept Phase completed in February 2022, with four winners announced by Energy Secretary Jennifer Granholm:

- Project Tango, submitted by QuarkStar of Las Vegas, Nevada. The networked, white-tunable luminaire concept leverages innovations in optics, LED, and power conversion technology to deliver high efficacy, exceptional quality of light, and precise control of light distribution.
- Sustainable and Connected Troffer Retrofit, submitted by Orion Energy Systems of Jacksonville, Florida. The concept offers a high-efficacy, networked LED luminaire with advanced controls that can be retrofitted in less than two minutes to an existing fluorescent luminaire.
- Laterally Symmetrical Level 3 Engine for 3D Printing, submitted by Smash the Bulb/Bridgelux of Mountain View, California. This 3D-printed semi-indirect luminaire concept uses a high-performance light engine that requires no secondary optics and delivers high efficacy and excellent quality of light; an innovative optical design that reduces losses and addresses glare; and a luminaire housing that can be 3D printed on the job site.
- Papaya Modular Lighting Ecosystem, submitted by Papaya of Evanston, Illinois. This highly modular luminaire platform designed by a team from outside the lighting industry uses a unique community-based approach; an all open-source aspect offers opportunities for innovators of all types to participate in evolving and innovating this lighting solution over time.

=== Prototype Phase ===
The L-Prize Prototype Phase invited physical, working prototype systems that emphasized technological innovation and challenged competitors to think outside the standard forms, materials, and price points of commercially available products. Competitors could submit products in the Luminaire Track, the Connected Systems Track, or both. Entries were scored across multiple criteria.

==== Luminaire Track Winners ====
- Generation Flex: Light Without Compromise, submitted by Signify Innovation of Bridgewater, New Jersey
- Low-Carbon Biodegradable Luminaire, submitted by Lightly of Boothwyn, Pennsylvania
- Helios HPR-LP160, submitted by Grid interactive Efficient Building Alliance (GiEBA) of San Diego, California

==== Connected Systems Track Winners ====
- Interact Next-Gen: Light the Way to Building Goals, submitted by Signify Innovation of Bridgewater, New Jersey
- Autani: Insights 4REAL, with Sensing by Leviton, submitted by Autani and Leviton of Columbia, Maryland
- Bluetooth Mesh Wireless Lighting Control System, submitted by McWong International of Sacramento, California

=== Manufacturing and Installation Phase ===
The Manufacturing and Installation Phase is designed to reward production and installation of products meeting the L-Prize technical requirements. Up to four competitors earning the most points based on innovation, U.S. content, production, and installation will share an award of $10 million. Like the Prototype Phase, the Manufacturing and Installation Phase will feature two separate tracks: a luminaire track and a connected systems track. Under the rules, competitors could submit an entry for one track or separate entries for both tracks, and DOE will evaluate each track’s submissions independently.
