= Prize4Life =

Non-profit ALS research organization

- Formation: June 2007; 18 years ago
- Founder: Avi Kremer
- Type: Non-profit
- Location(s): Berkeley, California (defunct) and Haifa, Israel
- Website: Prize4Life; Prize4Life Israel

Prize4Life is a non-profit organization dedicated to the discovery of treatments and a cure for amyotrophic lateral sclerosis (ALS). The organization uses the inducement prize contest model. It was founded in 2007 by Avi Kremer, an Israeli student at Harvard Business School, who was diagnosed with ALS at the age of 29.

On February 3, 2011, Prize4Life announced the award of their first prize, the $1M ALS Biomarker Prize, to Seward Rutkove for his development of a tool to track the progression of the disease.

On November 1, 2018, Prize4Life in the United States announced they were shutting down and transferring their assets to the ALS Association. The Israeli nonprofit under the same name continues to operate.
