= Maximum Absorbency Garment =

Adult diaper used by NASA astronauts

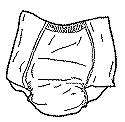
Drawing of a Maximum Absorbency Garment

A Maximum Absorbency Garment (MAG) is an adult-sized diaper with extra absorption material that NASA astronauts wear during liftoff, landing, and extra-vehicular activity (EVA) to absorb urine and feces. It is worn by both male and female astronauts. Astronauts can urinate into the MAG, and usually wait to defecate when they return to the spacecraft. However, the MAG is rarely used for this purpose, since the astronauts use the facilities of the station before EVA and also time the consumption of the in-suit water. Nonetheless, the garment provides peace of mind for the astronauts.

The MAG was developed because astronauts cannot remove their space suits during long operations, such as spacewalks that usually last for several hours. Generally, three MAGs were given during space shuttle missions, one for launch, reentry, and an extra for spacewalking or for a second reentry attempt. Astronauts drink about 2 L (2.1 US qt) of salty water before reentry since less fluid is retained in zero G. Without the extra fluids, the astronauts might faint in Earth's gravity, further highlighting the potential necessity of the MAGs. It is worn underneath the Liquid Cooling and Ventilation Garment (LCVG).

== History ==
On the first crewed American Spaceflight, Mercury-Redstone 3, astronaut Alan Shepard was not issued any device to collect urine, as he was not expected to need it for the duration of the 15 minute sub-orbital flight. However, after four hours waiting on the pad he could no longer hold it, and had to urinate inside his pressure suit, shorting the biomedical electrodes attached to his body. On the second crewed flight, Gus Grissom was issued with a rudimentary urine collection device (UCD), two pairs of rubber underpants. After this flight, NASA began studies on developing a more effective UCD for the Mercury astronauts, resulting in a personal urinal device consisting of a 'roll-on-cuff' external condom catheter that used the suit's pressure and a valve to pass the urine along a tube into a collection bag. This was used by John Glenn on the first American orbital spaceflight, and continued in use through the Gemini and Apollo programs.

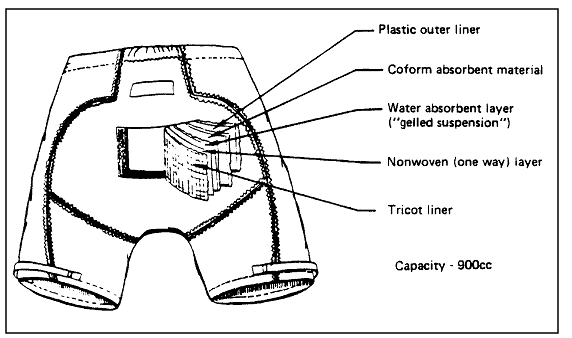
Disposable Absorption Containment Trunk (DACT)

During the Apollo era, astronauts used urine and fecal containment systems worn under spandex trunks. The fecal containment device (FCD) was a bag attached directly to the body with an adhesive seal, and the urine collection device (UCD) had a condom-like sheath attached to a tube and pouch. Women joined the astronaut corps in 1978 and required devices with similar functions. However, the early attempts to design feminized versions of the male devices were unsuccessful. In the 1980s, NASA designed space diapers which were called Disposable Absorption Containment Trunks (DACTs). These addressed the women's needs since it was comfortable, manageable, and resistant to leaks. These diapers were first used in 1983, during the first Challenger mission.

Disposable underwear, first introduced in the 1960s as baby's diapers then in 1980 for adult incontinence, appealed to NASA as a more practical option. In 1988, the Maximum Absorbency Garment replaced the DACT for female astronauts. NASA created the name Maximum Absorbency Garment to avoid using trade names. Male astronauts then adopted the MAG as well. In the 1990s, NASA ordered 3,200 of the diapers of the brand name Absorbencies, manufactured by a company that has folded. In 2007, about a third of the supply remained.

== Usage ==
The MAGs are pulled up like shorts. A powdery chemical absorbent called sodium polyacrylate is incorporated into the fabric of the garment. Sodium polyacrylate can absorb around 300 times its weight in distilled water. Assuming the astronaut urinates, the diaper would only need to be changed every eight to ten hours. The MAG can hold a maximum of 2 L (2.1 US qt) of urine, blood, and/or feces. The MAG absorbs the liquid and pulls it away from the skin.

== Media attention ==
These garments gained attention in February 2007, when astronaut Lisa Nowak drove 1,450 km (901 mi) to attack Air Force officer Colleen Shipman out of jealousy for her former lover. It was stated in a police report that Nowak said she used the diapers to avoid stops during her journey. However, Nowak denied these claims and testified that she did not wear these diapers during her trip.

== See also ==
- Extravehicular Mobility Unit
