= Intelligent Ground Vehicle Competition =

Annual autonomous robotics competition held in Michigan

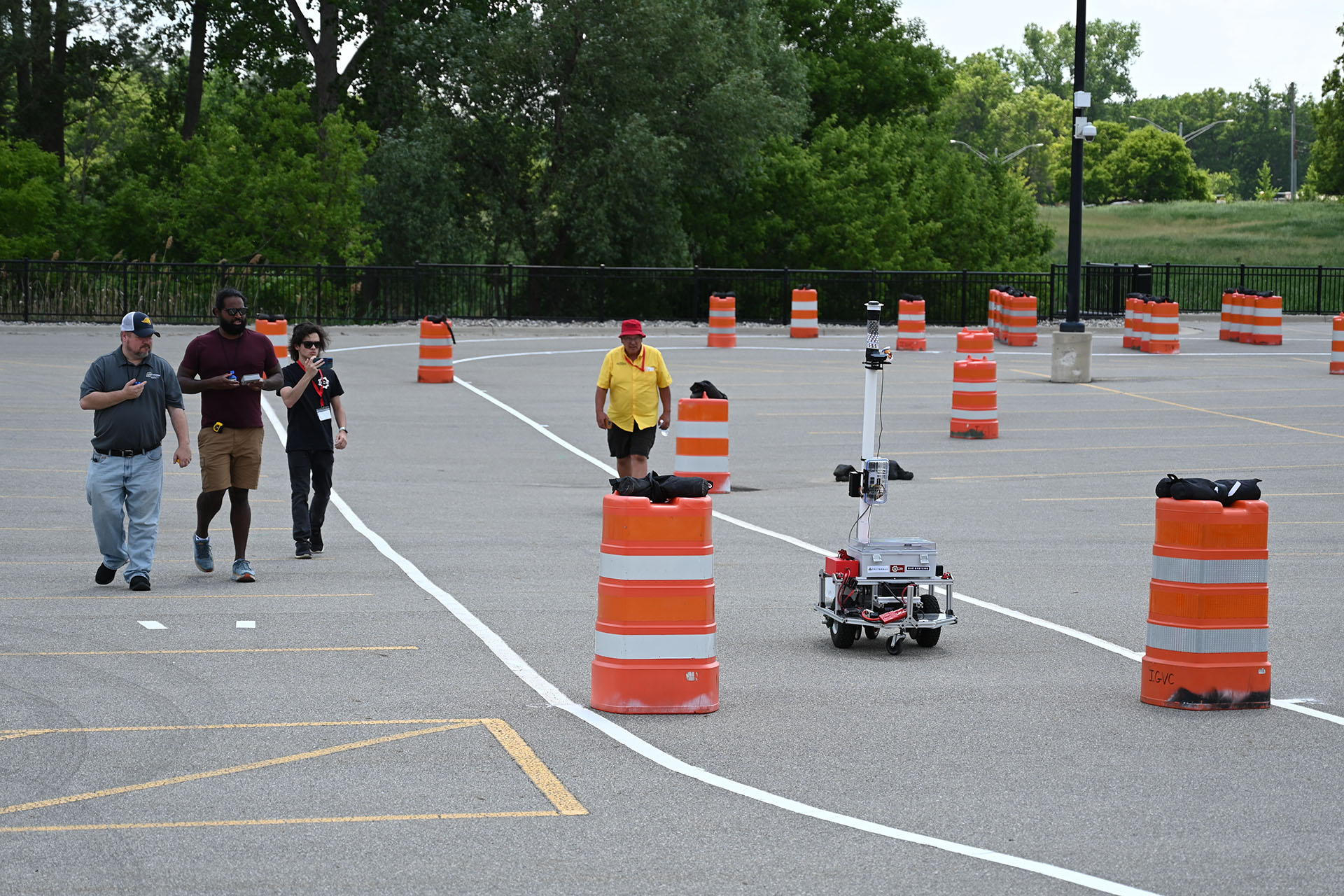
- AutoNav Challenge Robot

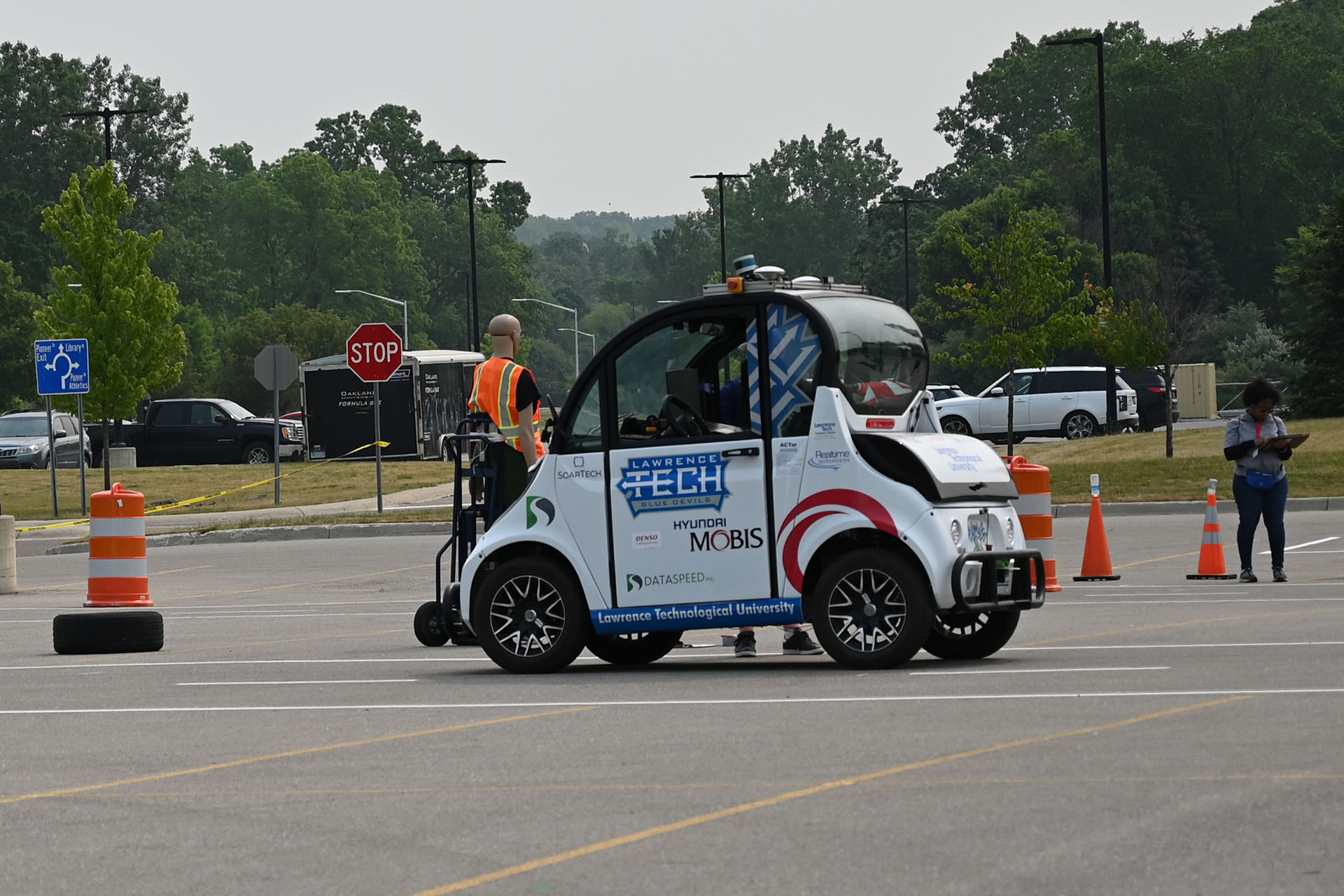
- Self Drive Challenge Vehicle
- Location: Rochester, Michigan
- Website: www.igvc.org

The Intelligent Ground Vehicle Competition (IGVC) is an annual international robotics competition for teams of undergraduate and graduate students. Teams may compete in either the AutoNav or Self Drive challenges. The competition is well suited to senior design capstone courses as well as extracurricular design projects.

The competition has taken place each year since 1993 with the exception of 2020 due to the COVID-19 pandemic. The competition is normally held on the campus of Oakland University in Rochester, Michigan, although it has occasionally moved to other venues within the state of Michigan.

The competition is often sponsored by Oakland University, the U.S. Army DEVCOM Ground Vehicle Systems Center, and the Association for Unmanned Vehicle Systems International (AUVSI) in addition to other sponsors.

== Competition overview ==
The details of the competition change each year and has featured several different challenges. The 2024 challenges are AutoNav, Self Drive, and Design. Previous challenges include the Cyber Security Challenge, IOP Challenge, Spec 2 Challenge, and the JAUS challenge.

The AutoNav challenge requires teams to design and build autonomous ground robots that are between 3 feet and 7 feet long. The challenge tasks the robots with navigating a complex course featuring lanes, obstacles, and a ramp. The course was placed on grass from 1993 to 2019 but was changed to asphalt in 2021. Teams are ranked by the time it took to complete the course or by distance traveled for teams that did not complete the course.

The Self Drive challenge features two-seat electric passenger vehicles that must autonomously complete a variety of challenges. The Self Drive challenge began in 2017 as the Spec 2 Challenge. Unlike the AutoNav challenge, most teams acquire a complete vehicle and then modify it to complete the challenge.
