= InnoCentive =

Open innovation and crowdsouring company

InnoCentive, Inc.
- Type: Private company
- Industry: Crowdsourcing, Cloud Labor, Open innovation, R & D, innovation management, product development
- Founded: Indianapolis, Indiana (2001)
- Headquarters: Waltham, Massachusetts, US
- Key people: Craig Jones (Chairman of the Board and Chief Executive Officer); Alpheus Bingham (Founder and Board of Directors member)
- Products: Innovation management, inducement prize contest, crowdsourcing, open innovation
- Website: InnoCentive.com http://www.innocentive.com/

InnoCentive is an open innovation and crowdsourcing company with its worldwide headquarters in Waltham, MA and their EMEA headquarters in London, UK. They enable organizations to put their unsolved problems and unmet needs, which are framed as ‘Challenges’, out to the crowd to address. In the case of InnoCentive, the crowd can either be external (i.e., their network of over 380,000 problem solvers) or internal (i.e., an organization's employees, partners or customers).

Awards, typically monetary, are given for submissions that meet the requirements set out in the Challenge description. The average award amount for a Challenge is $20,000 but some offer awards of over $100,000. To date, InnoCentive have run over 2,000 external Challenges and over 1,000 internal Challenges, awarding over $20 million in the process. Wazoku acquired InnoCentive in July 2020.

== History ==
The idea for InnoCentive came to Alpheus Bingham and Aaron Schacht in 1998 while they worked together at Eli Lilly and Company during a session that was focused on exploring application of the Internet to business. The company was launched in 2001 by Jill Panetta, Jeff Hensley, Darren Carroll and Alpheus Bingham, with majority seed funding from Eli Lilly and Company. Darren Carroll led the launch effort and became the first CEO.

In 2005, InnoCentive was spun out of Eli Lilly with investments led by Spencer Trask of New York. In December 2006, shortly after Dwayne Spradlin took the helm as CEO, the company signed an agreement with the Rockefeller Foundation to add a non-profit area designed to generate science and technology solutions to pressing problems in the developing world. Between 2006 and 2009, The Rockefeller Foundation posted 10 challenges on InnoCentive with an 80% success rate.

In 2006, Prize4Life partnered with InnoCentive to launch the $1 million ALS Biomarker Prize, which was a Grand Challenge designed to find a biomarker to measure the progression of ALS – also known as Lou Gehrig's disease – in patients. In February 2011, the $1 million prize was awarded to Dr. Seward Rutkove for his creation and validation of a clinically viable biomarker. In early 2011, InnoCentive launched four more Grand Challenges on behalf of Life Technologies.

In February 2012, InnoCentive acquired UK-based OmniCompete.

In July 2020, InnoCentive was acquired by innovation platform Wazoku, expanding Wazoku's crowdsourcing and open innovation capabilities. The acquisition combined InnoCentive's solver network and expertise with Wazoku's software solutions, creating one of the world’s largest open innovation communities.

== Products and services ==
=== Premium Challenges ===
Premium Challenges allow organizations to post their problems and needs to InnoCentive's problem solver network through the InnoCentive.com platform. Typically this process begins with a workshop led by InnoCentive in which appropriate problems and needs are identified. InnoCentive's PhD-educated Challenge Experts then work with clients to decompose and formulate the problem or need as a Challenge. The problem or need is abstracted to allow for insights across industries, perhaps even one that shares the problem and has already solved it. The Challenge description clearly defines the problem or need, the solution and Intellectual Property requirements, and the award amount that will be paid out for winning submissions.

Challenges are posted, anonymously if the client desires, on InnoCentive.com. Typically users will submit their solutions over a period of 30 to 90 days. Deliverables vary depending on the type of Challenge and can range from short proposals to experimentally validated solutions. After the client has finished evaluating the submissions and selecting the winners, InnoCentive handles the administration of award payments and IP transfers or licensing.

=== Custom Challenges ===
Custom Challenges come in two forms: Grand Challenges, which are high-profile Challenge programs that focus on a large problem, often calling for radical innovations and breakthrough solutions, and Showcase Challenges, which tend to focus on a specific sector and typically involve a live event.

=== InnoCentive@Work ===
InnoCentive is a SaaS-based open innovation platform that allows organizations to run private, internally focused Challenge programs that engage their employees, partners or customers. The platform can be customized and branded as required. Employees are able to comment and vote on their colleagues’ ideas, suggest ideas for Challenges, and participate in discussions on suggested Challenges and awarded submissions. The awards mechanism works slightly differently to Premium Challenges, tying into the organisation's existing benefits program, for example.

== User base ==
As of September 2017, there were over 380,000 users from nearly 200 countries in InnoCentive's problem solver network. All users have separately and specifically registered with InnoCentive and report expertise in a variety of fields including chemistry, life sciences, engineering, statistics, information technology, food and crop science and business. Nearly 60% are educated to Masters Level or above. InnoCentive have a number of partnerships that allow their clients access millions more users.

== Success rates ==
In 2016, 80% of Premium Challenges were awarded.

A study conducted by Forrester Consulting found that "the hygiene and health company Essity received a Return on Investment of 74% with a payback period of less than 3 months from their work with InnoCentive". Another study conducted by Forrester Consulting found that Syngenta achieved a return on investment of 182% with a payback period of less than 2 months.

== See also ==
- List of crowdsourcing projects
