= Green Launch =

American aerospace company

Green Launch is an American aerospace company developing alternative space launch technologies based on ground-based "impulse launchers" designed to reduce the cost of sending payloads into orbit. The company focuses on replacing the first stage of traditional rockets with hydrogen-powered light-gas launch systems that accelerate payloads from the ground before a secondary propulsion stage places them into orbit.

== History ==
Green Launch targets small, acceleration-tolerant payloads such as CubeSats and aims to provide low-cost and rapid launch services, including suborbital missions for hypersonic testing and atmospheric research. The concept builds on technologies previously developed in NASA and U.S. Air Force testing facilities over several decades. These include Project HARP, the experimental 1960s U.S. Army program, which serves as the basis for the company's hydrogen impulse launcher.

In December 2021, the company conducted a test of a vertical hydrogen light-gas launcher at Yuma Proving Ground, accelerating a projectile to speeds exceeding Mach 3 as a proof of concept for future space launch applications. Green Launch plans to scale this technology toward reaching the Karman line and eventually enabling orbital delivery of small payloads. Green Launch touts its space launch technologies to be better than competing technologies such as kinetic launch systems. It is claimed that the technologies are simpler and capable of launching cargo off the ground with nearly three times the velocity and with a quicker turnaround time.

== See also ==
- Space gun
- Light-gas gun
- Project Babylon
- Project HARP
- Quicklaunch
- Super High Altitude Research Project
