= Quicklaunch =

American aerospace company

- Company type: Private
- Industry: Aerospace
- Founded: 2010
- Headquarters: California, US
- Key people: John Hunter
- Website: quicklaunchinc.com

Quicklaunch is an inactive US company attempting to use a type of space gun to launch payloads into low Earth orbit. It is a university spin-off of the SHARP project which ended 2005.

== Quicklauncher ==
The Quicklaunch proposed firing apparatus was a light-gas gun using hydrogen as the working gas and natural gas as the explosive heat source. Heating and pre-pressurizing the hydrogen working gas takes 10 minutes before the shot and most of the hydrogen is recovered by a muzzle muffler at the end of the launch tube to be reused for subsequent launches.

The 1,100-metre-long (3,600 ft) gun would be, for the most part, submerged in the ocean. Its horizontal and vertical direction (azimuth and elevation) could be adjusted based on customer launch requirements.

The proposed launcher was designed to give projectiles an initial speed of 6 km/s (3.7 mi/s) while the Earth orbital speed is 6.9 to 7.8 km/s (4.3 to 4.8 mi/s). The projectile design therefore included a one-stage rocket which ignites some time after launch. The designed payloads could include spacecraft, satellites, consumable, water or fuel to supply a propellant depot in orbit.

Projected costs to orbit were $500 per pound ($1,100/kg).

== Project phases ==
1. A one-year 2 million dollar project to break the record height of 180 kilometres (110 mi) for a projectile fired from a space gun, which was achieved in Project HARP.
2. A two-year 10 million dollar project to launch to orbit a 1 kilogram (2.2 lb) payload each time.
3. A two-year 50 million dollar project to launch to orbit a 45 kilograms (99 lb) payload each time.
4. A three-year 500 million dollar project to build and operate multiple 1,100 metres (3,600 ft) long Quicklaunchers called the QL-1000 that are capable of launching 1,000 pounds (450 kg) propellant payloads to orbit. The goal is to supply 1,800,000 kilograms (4,000,000 lb) of fuel to orbital propellant depots yearly.

== Hiatus ==
In a 2016 article, Hunter remarked that the work had been put in stasis due in part to Elon Musk's company, SpaceX, taking up the challenge of reducing costs to orbit. Hunter however invited someone with a similar level of money and motivation, to take a fresh look at the approach. Later, Hunter ran a new start-up called Green Launch that is also developing a space light-gas gun.

== See also ==
- Non-rocket spacelaunch
- Super High Altitude Research Project
- Green Launch
