= SpinLaunch =

American spaceflight technology company

SpinLaunch Inc.
- Type: Private
- Industry: Aerospace
- Founded: 2014
- Founder: Jonathan Yaney
- Headquarters: 4350 E Conant St, Long Beach, California, United States
- Key people: CEO: David Wrenn
- Number of employees: 120–180 (estimate)
- Website: www.spinlaunch.com
- Footnotes; California Secretary of State, Built in LA

SpinLaunch is a spaceflight technology development company working on mass accelerator technology to move payloads to space. As of September 2022, the company has raised US$150 million in funding, with investors including Kleiner Perkins, Google Ventures, Airbus Ventures, ATW Partners, Catapult Ventures, Lauder Partners, John Doerr, and the Byers Family.

== History ==
SpinLaunch was founded in 2014 by Jonathan Yaney in Sunnyvale, California. The company's headquarters are in Long Beach. In 2020 it opened a launch site. SpinLaunch continued development of its 140,000 square-foot (13,000 m^{2}) corporate headquarters in Long Beach, and of its flight test facility at Spaceport America in New Mexico.

In late 2021, SpinLaunch was named one of the "World's Best Employers in the Space Industry" by Everything Space, a recruitment platform specializing in the space industry.

In March 2022, SpinLaunch was listed as one of the Top 100 Most Influential Companies of 2022 by Time Magazine. In April, SpinLaunch received a launch contract from NASA to test a payload.

In May 2024, SpinLaunch named Chief Operating Officer David Wrenn as Chief Executive Officer, replacing Jonathan Yaney. No specific rationale for Yaney's "completed" departure from SpinLaunch was provided.

In April 2025 after a long hiatus, the company announced a plan to develop a communications satellite constellation called Meridian consisting of 280 satellites, but they would be launched via conventional chemical rockets. It was still planning to develop kinetic launch systems and also announced a study to investigate Adak Island, Alaska as a launch site.

In August 2025, the company announced the closure of a $30 million funding round to support the development of Meridian, which it expected to begin operating in the second half of 2026.

== Technology ==
SpinLaunch is developing a kinetic energy space launch system that aims to reduce dependency on traditional chemical rockets, with the goal of significantly lowering the cost of access to space while increasing launch frequency. The system utilizes centrifugal force with slingshot action to accelerate rockets to eventually reach low Earth orbit. The vacuum-sealed centrifuge is able to spin a rocket at speeds of up to 4,700 mph (7,500 km/h; 2.1 km/s) before releasing it on a trajectory path headed towards low Earth orbit. Once the rocket reaches an altitude of roughly 200,000 ft (60 km), the rocket would then ignite its engines in order to reach an orbital speed of 17,150 mph (27,600 km/h; 7.666 km/s). Such rockets would be able to carry payloads of up to 440 lb (200 kg), with a peak centrifugal acceleration of approximately 10,000 g. Historical predecessors of this system include centrifugal guns.

If successful, the centrifuge sling launch concept is projected to lower the cost of launches and use less power, with the price of a single space launch potentially reduced by a factor of 20 to under US$500,000.

=== Considerations ===
==== Limitations ====
Any equipment or goods delivered by SpinLaunch must be capable of withstanding up to 10,000 g's of force during the centrifugal acceleration process. Additionally, no more than 880 lb (400 kg) of payload can be sent per launch.

==== Advantages ====
SpinLaunch provides a ground-based impulse to the launch vehicle, providing a shortcut around the rocket equation that dictates a conventional rocket's fuel needs grows exponentially with the weight of the payload. Due to this innovation, the projected cost per kilogram of payload is approximately $1,250–2,500. This projection is significantly less expensive than SpaceX's $6,000 for the Falcon 9.

== Flight testing ==
- On October 22, 2021 at its Spaceport America facility in New Mexico, SpinLaunch conducted its first vertical test of their accelerator situated at 20% of its full power capacity, hurling a 10-foot-long (3.0 m) passive projectile to an altitude of "tens of thousands of feet." This test accelerator, which is situated at 32°53'6"N 106°56'18"W, is 108 ft (33 m) in diameter, which makes it a one-third scale of the operational system that is being designed. The company's first 10 test flights reached as much as 30,000 feet (9,100 m) in altitude.
- A September 2022 test flight successfully carried payloads from NASA, Airbus US, Cornell Engineering’s Space Systems Design Studio (SSDS), and Outpost. The flight followed the trajectory that had been laid in for it. After the flight all contents of the payload were inspected and found to be in good order.

== See also ==
- Launch service provider
- Non-rocket spacelaunch
- Outline of space technology
- Reusable launch system
- Space gun
- High Altitude Research Facility
- Centrifugal gun
