= Non-rocket spacelaunch =

Concepts for launch into space

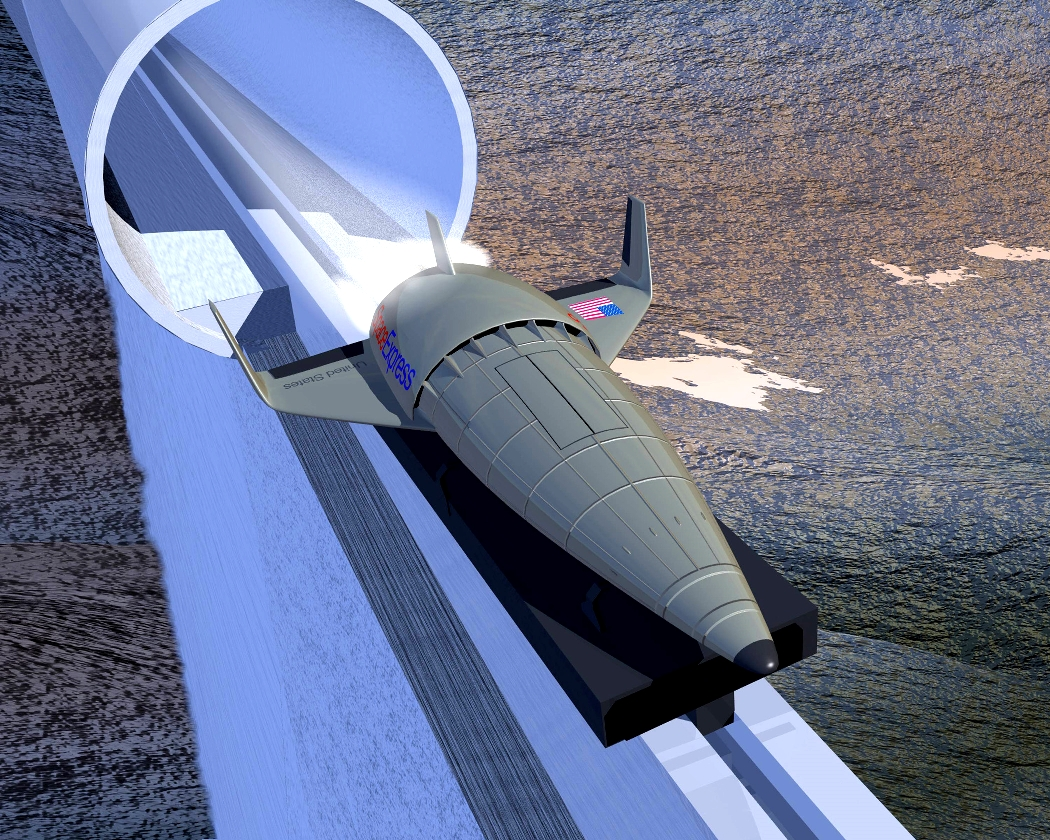
NASA illustration of a Maglifter sled launch.

Non-rocket spacelaunch refers to theoretical concepts for launch into space where much of the speed and altitude needed to achieve orbit is provided by a propulsion technique that is not subject to the limits of the rocket equation. Although all space launches to date have been rockets, a number of alternatives to rockets have been proposed. In some systems, such as a combination launch system, skyhook, rocket sled launch, rockoon, or air launch, a portion of the total delta-v may be provided, either directly or indirectly, by using rocket propulsion.

Present-day launch costs are very high – $2,500 to $25,000 per kilogram from Earth to low Earth orbit (LEO). As a result, launch costs are a large percentage of the cost of all space endeavors. If launch can be made cheaper, the total cost of space missions will be reduced. Due to the exponential nature of the rocket equation, providing even a small amount of the velocity to LEO by other means has the potential of greatly reducing the cost of getting to orbit.

Launch costs in the hundreds of dollars per kilogram would make possible many proposed large-scale space projects such as space colonization, space-based solar power and terraforming Mars.

== Comparison of space launch methods ==
Method (Note: References in this column apply to entire row unless specifically replaced.)	First described	Estimated build cost (billion US$) (Note: All monetary values in un-inflated dollars based on reference publication date except as noted.)	Payload mass (kg)	Estimated cost to LEO (US$/kg)	Capacity (t/year)	Technology readiness level
Expendable rocket	1903		225–130,000	1,500–30,000	n/a	9
Space elevator	1895					2
Space tether	1970s	< 1				8 (Note: TRL 8 applies to a space tether that changed the trajectory of an onboard payload, as conducted by the YES2 mission and others)
Non-rotating skyhook	1990	< 1				2
Hypersonic skyhook	1993	< 1 (Note: CY2008 estimate from description in 1993 reference system.)	1,500 (Note: Requires first stage to ~ 5 km/s.)		30 (Note: Subject to very rapid increase via bootstrapping.)	2
Rotovator	1977					2
Hypersonic Airplane Space Tether Orbital Launch (HASTOL)	2000		15,000 (Note: Requires Boeing proposed DF-9 vehicle first stage to ~ 4 km/s.)			2
Space fountain	1980s					
Orbital ring	1980	15	2×10^{11}	< 0.05	4×10^{10}	2
Launch loop (small)	1985	10	5,000	300	40,000	2+
Launch loop (large)	1985	30	5,000	3	6,000,000	2+
KITE Launcher	2005					2
StarTram	2001	20 (Note: Based on Gen-1 reference design, 2010 version.)	35,000	43	150,000	2
Space gun	1865 (Note: Jules Verne's novel From the Earth to the Moon. Newton's cannonball in the 1728 book A Treatise of the System of the World was considered a thought experiment.)	0.5	450	200		6
Space runway	1979	1-2		0.25-250		
Ram accelerator	2004					6
SpinLaunch	2022					6
Slingatron	1998		100			2 to 4

== Static structures ==
In this usage, the term "static" is intended to convey the understanding that the structural portion of the system has no internal moving parts.

=== Space tower ===
A space tower is a tower that would reach outer space. To avoid an immediate need for a vehicle launched at orbital velocity to raise its perigee, a tower would have to extend above the edge of space (above the 100 km Kármán line), but a far lower tower height could reduce atmospheric drag losses during ascent. If the tower went all the way to geosynchronous orbit at approximately 35,999 kilometres (22,369 mi), objects released at such height could then drift away with minimal power and would be in a circular orbit. The concept of a structure reaching to geosynchronous orbit was first conceived by Konstantin Tsiolkovsky. The original concept envisioned by Tsiolkovsky was a compression structure. Building a compression structure from the ground up proved an unrealistic task as there was no material in existence with enough compressive strength to support its own weight under such conditions. Other ideas use very tall compressive towers to reduce the demands on launch vehicles. The vehicle is "elevated" up the tower, which may extend above the atmosphere and is launched from the top. Such a tall tower to access near-space altitudes of 20 km (12 mi) has been proposed by various researchers.

== Tensile structures ==
Tensile structures for non-rocket spacelaunch are proposals to use long, very strong cables (known as tethers) to lift a payload into space. Tethers can also be used for changing orbit once in space.

Orbital tethers can be tidally locked (skyhook) or rotating (rotovators). They can be designed (in theory) to pick up the payload when the payload is stationary or when the payload is hypersonic (has a high but not orbital velocity).

Endo-atmospheric tethers can be used to transfer kinetics (energy and momentum) between large conventional aircraft (subsonic or low supersonic) or other motive force and smaller aerodynamic vehicles, propelling them to hypersonic velocities without exotic propulsion systems.

=== Skyhook ===
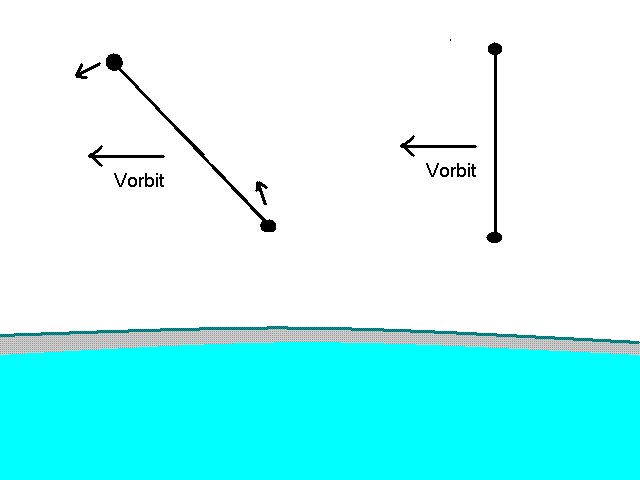
A rotating and non-rotating skyhooks in orbit

A skyhook is a theoretical class of orbiting tether propulsion intended to lift payloads to high altitudes and speeds. Proposals for skyhooks include designs that employ tethers spinning at hypersonic speed for catching high speed payloads or high altitude aircraft and placing them in orbit.

=== Space elevator ===
A space elevator would consist of a cable anchored to the Earth's surface, reaching into space.

A space elevator is a proposed type of space transportation system. Its main component is a ribbon-like cable (also called a tether) anchored to the surface and extending into space above the level of geosynchronous orbit. As the planet rotates, the centrifugal force at the upper end of the tether counteracts gravity, and keeps the cable taut. Vehicles can then climb the tether and reach orbit without the use of rocket propulsion.

Such a cable could be made out of any material able to support itself under tension by tapering the cable's diameter sufficiently quickly as it approached the Earth's surface. On Earth, with its relatively strong gravity, current materials are not sufficiently strong and light. With conventional materials, the taper ratio would need to be very large, increasing the total launch mass to a fiscally infeasible degree. However, carbon nanotube- or boron nitride nanotube-based materials have been proposed as the tensile element in the tether design. Their measured strengths are high compared to their linear densities. They hold promise as materials to make an Earth-based space elevator possible.

Landis and Cafarelli suggested that a tension structure ("space elevator") extending downward from geosynchronous orbit could be combined with the compression structure ("Tsiolkovski tower") extending upward from the surface, forming the combined structure reaching geosynchronous orbit from the surface, and having structural advantages over either one individually.

The space elevator concept is also applicable to other planets and celestial bodies. For locations in the Solar System with weaker gravity than Earth's (such as the Moon or Mars), the strength-to-density requirements aren't as great for tether materials. Currently available materials (such as Kevlar) could serve as the tether material for elevators there.

=== Endo-atmospheric tethers ===
KITE Launcher — transferring momentum to the vehicle.

An endo-atmospheric tether uses the long cable within the atmosphere to provide some or all of the velocity needed to reach orbit. The tether is used to transfer kinetics (energy and momentum) from a massive, slow end (typically a large subsonic or low supersonic aircraft) to a hypersonic end through aerodynamics or centripetal action. The Kinetics Interchange TEther (KITE) Launcher is one proposed endo-atmospheric tether.

== Dynamic structures ==
=== Space fountain ===
Hyde design space fountain.

A space fountain is a proposed form of space elevator that does not require the structure to be in geosynchronous orbit, and does not rely on tensile strength for support. In contrast to the original space elevator design (a tethered satellite), a space fountain is a tremendously tall tower extending up from the ground. Since such a tall tower could not support its own weight using traditional materials, massive pellets are projected upward from the bottom of the tower and redirected back down once they reach the top, so that the force of redirection holds the top of the tower aloft.

=== Orbital ring ===
Orbital ring.

An orbital ring is a concept for a giant artificially constructed ring hanging at low Earth orbit that would rotate at slightly above orbital speed that would have fixed tethers hanging down to the ground.

In a series of 1982 articles published in the Journal of the British Interplanetary Society, Paul Birch presented the concept of orbital ring systems. He proposed a rotating cable placed in a low Earth orbit, rotating at slightly faster than orbital speed. Not in orbit, but riding on this ring, supported electromagnetically on superconducting magnets, are ring stations that stay in one place above some designated point on Earth. Hanging down from these ring stations are short space elevators made from cables with high tensile-strength-to-mass ratio. Birch claimed that the ring stations, in addition to holding the tether, could accelerate the orbital ring eastwards, causing it to precess around Earth.

In 1982 the Belarusian inventor Anatoly Yunitskiy also proposed an electromagnetic track encircling the Earth, which he called the "String Transportation System." When the velocity of the string exceeds 10 km/sec, centrifugal forces would detach the string from the Earth's surface and lift the ring into space.

=== Launch loop ===
Launch loop.

A launch loop or Lofstrom loop is a design for a belt-based maglev orbital launch system that would be around 2000 km long and maintained at an altitude of up to 80 kilometres (50 mi). Vehicles weighing 5 metric tons would be electromagnetically accelerated on top of the cable which forms an acceleration track, from which they would be projected into Earth orbit or even beyond. The structure would constantly need around 200 MW of power to keep it in place.

The system is designed to be suitable for launching humans for space tourism, space exploration and space colonization with a maximum of 3 g acceleration.

=== Pneumatic freestanding tower ===
One proposed design is a freestanding tower composed of high strength material (e.g. kevlar) tubular columns inflated with a low density gas mix, and with dynamic stabilization systems including gyroscopes and "pressure balancing". Suggested benefits in contrast to other space elevator designs include avoiding working with the great lengths of structure involved in some other designs, construction from the ground instead of orbit, and functional access to the entire range of altitudes within the design's practical reach. The design presented is "at 5 km altitude and extending to 20 km above sea level", and the authors suggest that "the approach may be further scaled to provide direct access to altitudes above 200 km".

A major difficulty of such a tower is buckling since it is a long slender construction.

== Projectile launchers ==
With any of these projectile launchers, the launcher gives a high velocity at, or near, ground level. In order to achieve orbit, the projectile must be given enough extra velocity to punch through the atmosphere, unless it includes an additional propulsion system (such as a rocket). Also, the projectile needs either an internal or external means to perform orbital insertion. The designs below fall into three categories, electrically driven, chemically driven, and mechanically driven.

=== Electromagnetic acceleration ===
Electrical launch systems include mass drivers, railguns, and coilguns. All of these systems use the concept of a stationary launch track which uses some form of linear electrical motor to accelerate a projectile.

==== Mass driver ====
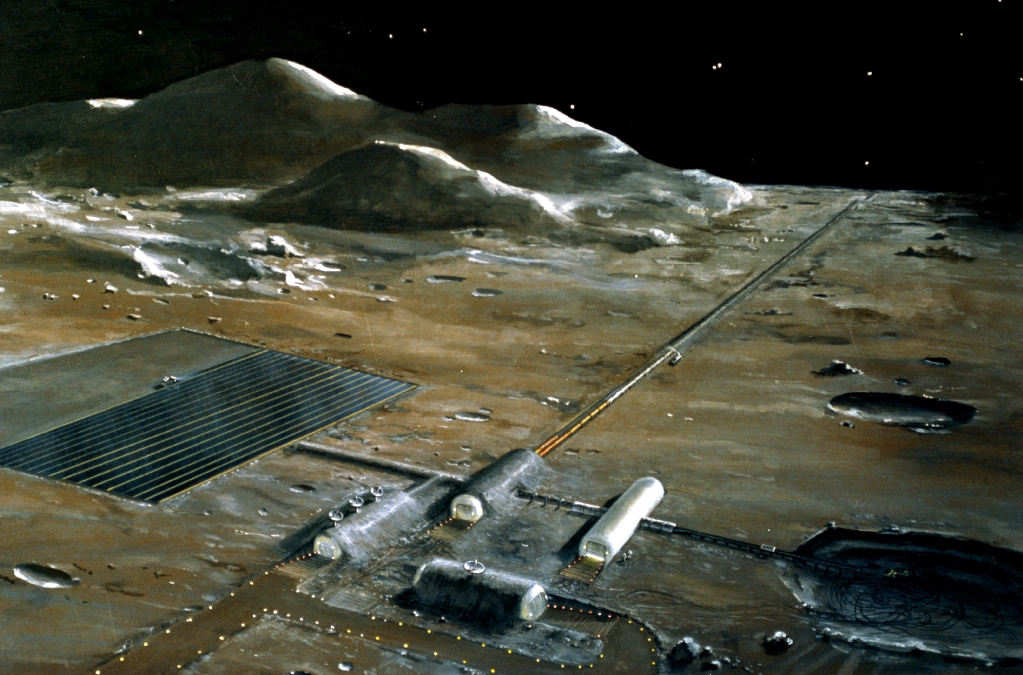
A mass driver for lunar launch (artist's conception).

Electro-dynamic interactions in a railgun.

In essence, a mass driver is a very long and mainly horizontally aligned launch track or tunnel for accelerating payloads to orbital or suborbital velocities. The concept was proposed by Arthur C. Clarke in 1950, and was developed in more detail by Gerard K. O'Neill, working with the Space Studies Institute, focusing on the use of a mass driver for launching material from the Moon.

A mass driver uses some sort of repulsion to keep a payload separated from the track or walls. Then it uses a linear motor (an alternating-current motor such as in a coil gun, or a homopolar motor as in a railgun) to accelerate the payload to high speeds. After leaving the launch track, the payload would be at its launch velocity.

==== StarTram ====
StarTram is a proposal to launch vehicles directly to space by accelerating them with a mass driver. Vehicles would float by maglev repulsion between superconductive magnets on the vehicle and the aluminum tunnel walls while they were accelerated by AC magnetic drive from aluminum coils. The power required would probably be provided by superconductive energy storage units distributed along the tunnel. Vehicles could coast up to low or even geosynchronous orbital height; then a small rocket motor burn would be required to circularize the orbit.

Cargo-only Generation 1 systems would accelerate at 10–20 Gs and exit from a mountain top. While not suitable for passengers, they could put cargo into orbit for $40 per kilogram, 100 times cheaper than rockets.

Passenger-capable Generation 2 systems would accelerate for a much longer distance at 2 Gs. The vehicles would enter the atmosphere at an altitude of 20 km from an evacuated tunnel restrained by Kevlar tethers and supported by magnetic repulsion between superconducting cables in the tunnel and on the ground. For both Gen 1–2 systems, the mouth of the tube would be open during vehicle acceleration, with air kept out by magnetohydrodynamic pumping.

=== Chemical ===
==== Space gun ====
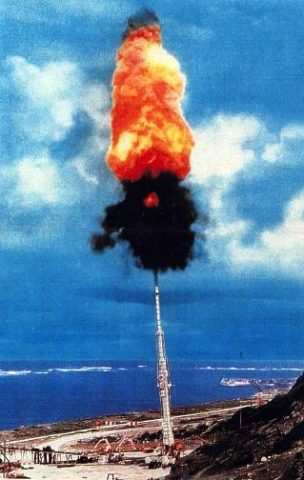
Project HARP, a prototype of a space gun.

A space gun is a proposed method of launching an object into outer space using a large gun, or cannon. Science fiction writer Jules Verne proposed such a launch method in From the Earth to the Moon, and in 1902 a movie, A Trip to the Moon, was adapted.

However, even with a "gun barrel" through both the Earth's crust and troposphere, the g-forces required to generate escape velocity would still be more than what a human tolerates. Therefore, the space gun would be restricted to freight and ruggedized satellites. Also, the projectile needs either an internal or external means to stabilize on orbit.

Gun launch concepts do not always use combustion. In pneumatic launch systems, a projectile is accelerated in a long tube by air pressure, produced by ground-based turbines or other means. In a light-gas gun, the pressurant is a gas of light molecular weight, to maximize the speed of sound in the gas.

John Hunter of Green Launch proposes use of a 'Hydrogen Gun' to launch uncrewed payloads to orbit for less than the regular launch costs.

==== Ram accelerator ====
A ram accelerator also uses chemical energy like the space gun but it is entirely different in that it relies on a jet-engine-like propulsion cycle utilizing ramjet and/or scramjet combustion processes to accelerate the projectile to extremely high speeds. It is a long tube filled with a mixture of combustible gases with a frangible diaphragm at either end to contain the gases. The projectile, which is shaped like a ram jet core, is fired by another means (e.g., a space gun, discussed above) supersonically through the first diaphragm into the end of the tube. It then burns the gases as fuel, accelerating down the tube under jet propulsion. Other physics come into play at higher velocities.

==== Blast wave accelerator ====
A blast wave accelerator is similar to a space gun but it differs in that rings of explosive along the length of the barrel are detonated in sequence to keep the accelerations high. Also, rather than just relying on the pressure behind the projectile, the blast wave accelerator specifically times the explosions to squeeze on a tail cone on the projectile, as one might shoot a pumpkin seed by squeezing the tapered end.

=== Mechanical ===
==== Slingatron ====
In a slingatron, projectiles are accelerated along a rigid tube or track that typically has circular or spiral turns, or combinations of these geometries in two or three dimensions. A projectile is accelerated in the curved tube by propelling the entire tube in a small-amplitude circular motion of constant or increasing frequency without changing the orientation of the tube, i.e. the entire tube gyrates but does not spin. An everyday example of this motion is stirring a beverage by holding the container and moving it in small horizontal circles, causing the contents to spin, without spinning the container itself.

This gyration continually displaces the tube with a component along the direction of the centripetal force acting on the projectile, so that work is continually done on the projectile as it advances through the machine. The centripetal force experienced by the projectile is the accelerating force, and is proportional to the projectile mass and inversely proportional to the track's radius of curvature.

A slingatron is capable of much higher velocities than a similar circular launcher based on a rotating tether made of currently available materials (e.g. Dyneema). The maximum tip velocity of a rotating tether, irrespective of its absolute scale, is limited by the strength to weight ratio of its materials, as the tether must support its own mass under centripetal acceleration as well as that of the projectile. In the slingatron, the projectile's centrifugal force is instead reacted into a nonrotating structure which can be as massive as necessary.

Actually applying this force between the guide tube and the superfast projectile is one of the slingatron's main technical challenges. In his initial paper, Dr. Derek A. Tidman, the slingatron's inventor, assumed that, to eliminate friction, the projectile would have to be supported by magnetic levitation in an evacuated tube. Later, Tidman suggested instead that projectiles with an ablative surface could slide directly against the wall of the guide tube. At high speeds, the vaporized projectile surface would form a cushion of gas for the projectile to ride along, minimizing friction. He predicted that most of the energy lost to friction would go to vaporizing the ablator rather than eroding the guide tube, allowing the slingatron to compare favorably with light gas guns in terms of barrel wear.

It is this friction that sets the minimum size of a slingatron for a given projectile mass and launch velocity. For a given speed, a smaller track will cause the projectile to experience higher centripetal acceleration, pressing it harder into the track and increasing friction. If the friction is too high, the projectile can't accelerate. Nor can the amplitude of the track's gyrating motion be increased to compensate, as it suffers from the same tip velocity limitation as the simple rotating tether. But according to Tidman's analysis, a slingatron launching 1 lb (454 g) projectiles at 6 km/s (about 80% of orbital velocity) could be as small as 11.2 meters across, though at over 10,000 rpm, such a launcher would need to have a gyration speed faster than some hard drives.

All of Tidman's later slingatron designs use a spiral rather than a circular track. The projectile starts in the middle and accelerates in multiple turns as it moves outwards while the track gyrates at a constant speed. Not only does this keep the projectile in phase, but also, providing its motors have enough power, allows the machine to operate in a rapid-fire mode, launching a projectile as often as once per revolution. Tidman died in 2019.

==== SpinLaunch ====
American aerospace company SpinLaunch is developing a kinetic energy launch system that accelerates the payload on the arm of a vacuum-sealed centrifuge before hurling it to space at up to 4,700 mph (7,500 km/h; 2.1 km/s). The rocket then ignites its engines at an altitude of roughly 200,000 ft (60 km) to reach orbital speed of 17,150 mph (27,600 km/h; 7.666 km/s) with a payload of up to 200kg. SpinLaunch has conducted several successful launch tests on a one-third scale prototype as of 2023.

=== Air launch ===
In air launch, a carrier aircraft carries the space vehicle to high altitude and speed before release. This technique was used on the suborbital X-15 and SpaceshipOne vehicles, and for the Pegasus orbital launch vehicle.

The main disadvantages are that the carrier aircraft tends to be quite large, and separation within the airflow at supersonic speeds has never been demonstrated as the boost given is relatively modest.

=== Spaceplanes ===
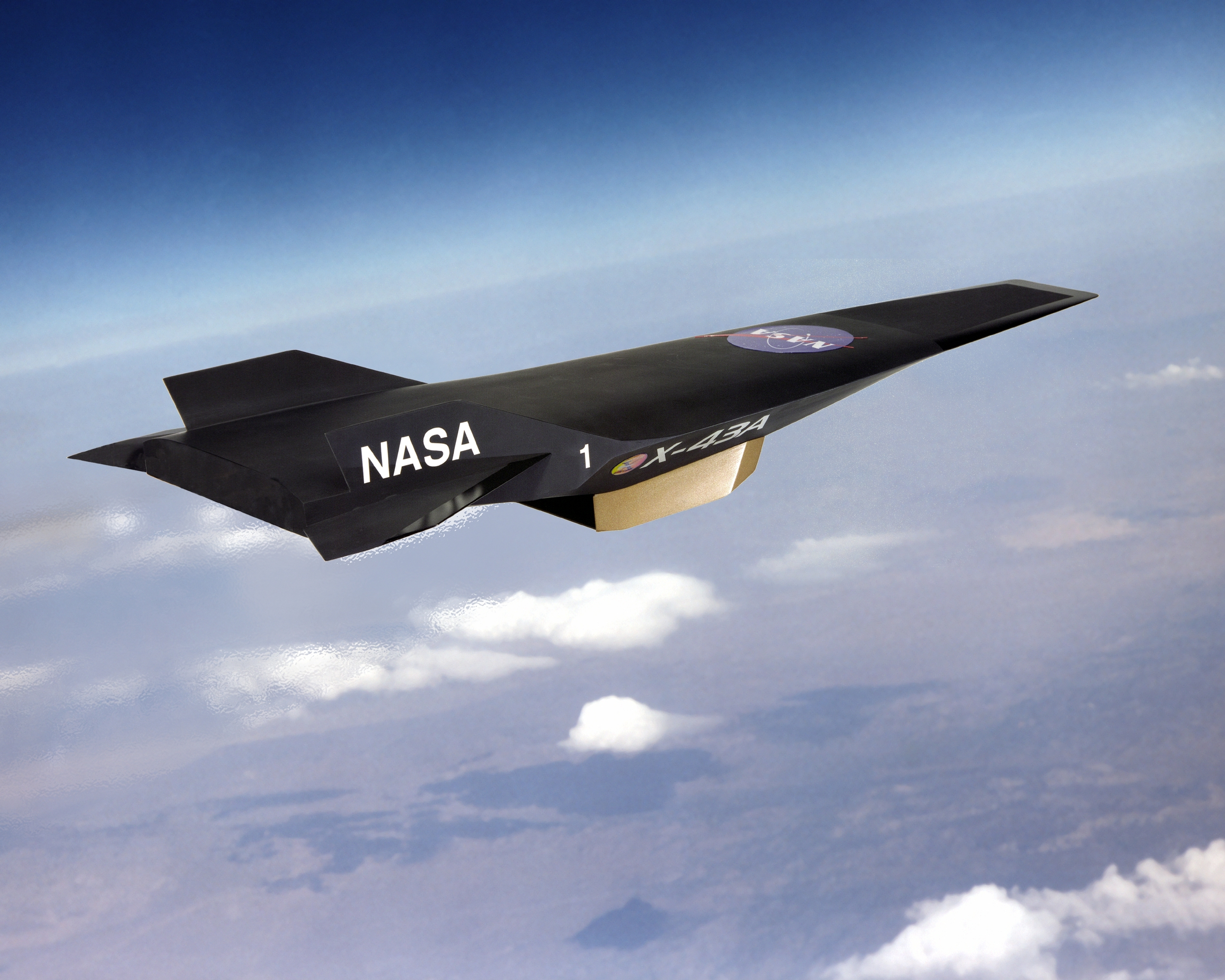
Artist's conception of NASA's X-43A hypersonic aircraft with scramjet attached to the underside.

A spaceplane is an aircraft designed to pass the edge of space. It combines some features of an aircraft with some of a spacecraft. Typically, it takes the form of a spacecraft equipped with aerodynamic surfaces, one or more rocket engines, and sometimes additional airbreathing propulsion as well.

Early spaceplanes were used to explore hypersonic flight (e.g. X-15).

Some air-breathing engine-based designs (cf X-30) such as aircraft based on scramjets or pulse detonation engines could potentially achieve orbital velocity or go some useful way to doing so; however, these designs still must perform a final rocket burn at their apogee to circularize their trajectory to avoid returning to the atmosphere. Other, reusable turbojet-like designs like Skylon which uses precooled jet engines up to Mach 5.5 before employing rockets to enter orbit appears to have a mass budget that permits a larger payload than pure rockets while achieving it in a single stage.

== Balloon ==
Balloons can raise the initial altitude of rockets. However, balloons have relatively low payload (although see the Sky Cat project for an example of a heavy-lift balloon intended for use in the lower atmosphere), and this decreases even more with increasing altitude.

The lifting gas could be helium or hydrogen. Helium is not only expensive in large quantities but is also a nonrenewable resource. This makes balloons an expensive launch assist technique. Hydrogen could be used as it has the advantage of being cheaper and lighter than helium, but the disadvantage of also being highly flammable. Rockets launched from balloons, known as "rockoons", have been demonstrated, but, to date, only for suborbital ("sounding rocket") missions. The size of balloon that would be required to lift an orbital launch vehicle would be extremely large.

One prototype of a balloon launch platform has been made by JP Aerospace as "Project Tandem", although it has not been used as a rocket launch vehicle. JP Aerospace further proposes a hypersonic, lighter than air upper stage. A Spanish company, zero2infinity, is officially developing a launcher system called bloostar based on the rockoon concept, expected to be operational by 2018.

Gerard K. O'Neill proposed that by using very large balloons it may be possible to construct a space port in the stratosphere. Rockets could launch from it or a mass driver could accelerate payloads into the orbit. This has the advantage that most (about 90%) of the atmosphere is below the space port. A SpaceShaft is a proposed version of an atmospherically buoyant structure that would serve as a system to lift cargo to near-space altitudes, with platforms distributed at several elevations that would provide habitation facilities for long term human operations throughout the mid-atmosphere and near-space altitudes. For space launch, it would serve as a non-rocket first stage for rockets launched from the top.

== Hybrid launch systems ==
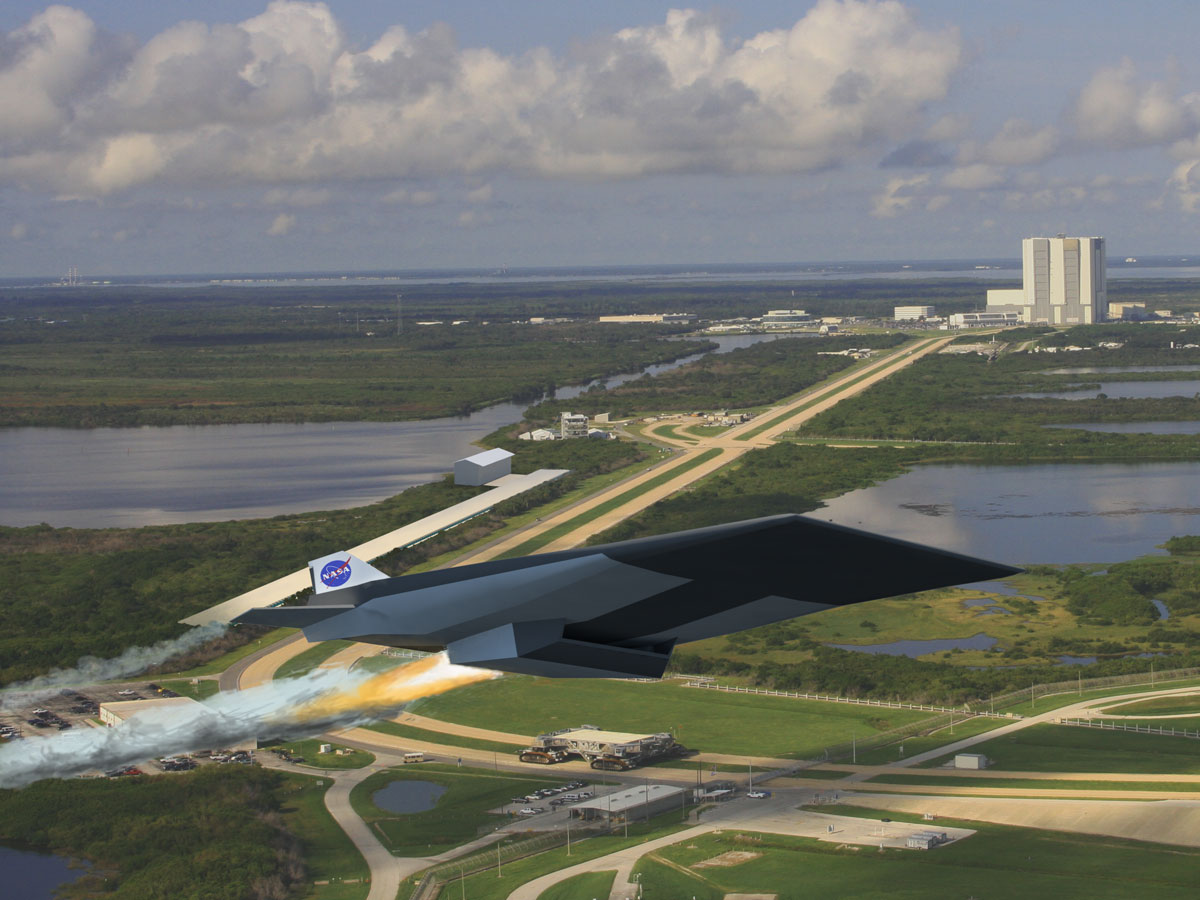
NASA art for a concept combining three technologies: electromagnetic launch assist from a hypothetical 2-mile (3.2 km) track at Kennedy Space Center, a scramjet aircraft, and a carried rocket for use after air launch reaches orbit.

Separate technologies may be combined. In 2010, NASA suggested that a future scramjet aircraft might be accelerated to 300 m/s (a solution to the problem of ramjet engines not being startable at zero airflow velocity) by electromagnetic or other sled launch assist, in turn air-launching a second-stage rocket delivering a satellite to orbit.

All forms of projectile launchers are at least partially hybrid systems if launching to low Earth orbit, due to the requirement for orbit circularization, at a minimum entailing approximately 1.5 percent of the total delta-v to raise perigee (e.g. a tiny rocket burn), or in some concepts much more from a rocket thruster to ease ground accelerator development.

Some technologies can have exponential scaling if used in isolation, making the effect of combinations be of counter-intuitive magnitude. For instance, 270 m/s is under 4% of the velocity of low Earth orbit, but a NASA study estimated that Maglifter sled launch at that velocity could increase the payload of a conventional ELV rocket by 80% when also having the track go up a 3000‑meter mountain.

Forms of ground launch limited to a given maximum acceleration (such as due to human g-force tolerances if intended to carry passengers) have the corresponding minimum launcher length scale not linearly but with velocity squared. Tethers can have even more non-linear, exponential scaling. The tether-to-payload mass ratio of a space tether would be around 1:1 at a tip velocity 60% of its characteristic velocity but becomes more than 1000:1 at a tip velocity 240% of its characteristic velocity. For instance, for anticipated practicality and a moderate mass ratio with current materials, the HASTOL concept would have the first half (4 km/s) of velocity to orbit be provided by other means than the tether itself.

A proposal to use a hybrid system combining a mass driver for initial lofting followed by additive thrust by a series of ground-based lasers sequenced according to wavelength was proposed by Mashall Savage in the book The Millennial Project as one of the core theses of the book, but the idea has not been pursued to any notable degree. Savage's specific proposals proved to be infeasible on both engineering and political grounds, and while the difficulties could be overcome, the group Savage founded, now called the Living Universe Foundation, has been unable to raise significant funds for research.

Combining multiple technologies would in itself be an increase to complexity and development challenges, but reducing the performance requirements of a given subsystem may allow reduction in its individual complexity or cost. For instance, the number of parts in a liquid-fueled rocket engine may be two orders of magnitude less if pressure-fed rather than pump-fed if its delta-v requirements are limited enough to make the weight penalty of such be a practical option, or a high-velocity ground launcher may be able to use a relatively moderate performance and inexpensive solid fuel or hybrid small motor on its projectile. Assist by non-rocket methods may compensate against the weight penalty of making an orbital rocket reusable. Though suborbital, the first private crewed spaceship, SpaceShipOne had reduced rocket performance requirements due to being a combined system with its air launch.

== See also ==
- Air launch to orbit
- Comparison of orbital launch systems
- Hopper (spacecraft)
- Mass driver
- Spacecraft propulsion
