= Marlatt =

Marlatt is a surname. Notable people with the surname include:

- Abby Lillian Marlatt (1869–1943), American educator
- Abby Marlatt (1916–2010), advocate of the civil rights movement
- Andrew Marlatt, founder of SatireWire, a news satire website
- Charles Lester Marlatt (1863–1954), American entomologist
- Daphne Marlatt, née Buckle, CM (born 1942), Canadian poet who lives in Vancouver, British Columbia
- Earl Marlatt (1892–1976), American theologian and poet
- Frances K. Marlatt (1901–1969), New York assemblywoman
- G. Alan Marlatt Ph.D. (1941–2011), Professor of Psychology at the University of Washington
- Hamilton Irving Marlatt (1867–1929), American born painter from Rochester, New York
- Harvey Marlatt (born 1948), professional basketball player

== See also ==
- Marlatt Hall, residence hall at Kansas State University, United States
- Marlett
- Marlette (disambiguation)
- Marollette
- Marolt
