= Space gun =

Method of launching an object into outer space via a large gun or cannon

The Quicklauncher spacegun

A space gun, sometimes called a Verne gun, is a theoretical method of launching an object into space using a large gun- or cannon-like structure. Space guns could thus potentially provide a method of non-rocket spacelaunch. It has been conjectured that space guns could place satellites into Earth's orbit (although after-launch propulsion of the satellite would be necessary to achieve a stable orbit), and could also launch spacecraft beyond Earth's gravitational pull and into other parts of the Solar System by exceeding Earth's escape velocity of about 11.20 km/s (40,320 km/h; 25,050 mph). However, these speeds are too far into the hypersonic range for most practical propulsion systems and also would cause most objects to burn up due to aerodynamic heating or be torn apart by aerodynamic drag. Therefore, a more likely future use of space guns would be to launch objects into Low Earth orbit, at which point attached rockets could be fired or the objects could be "collected" by maneuverable orbiting satellites.

In Project HARP, a 1960s joint United States and Canada defence project, a U.S. Navy 410 mm (16 in) 100 caliber gun was used to fire a 180 kg (400 lb) projectile at 3,600 m/s (12,960 km/h; 8,050 mph), reaching an apogee of 180 km (110 mi), hence performing a suborbital spaceflight. However, a space gun has never been successfully used to launch an object into orbit or out of Earth's gravitational pull.

== Technical issues ==
The large g-force likely to be experienced by a ballistic projectile launched in this manner would mean that a space gun would be incapable of safely launching humans or delicate instruments, rather being restricted to freight, fuel or ruggedized satellites.

=== Getting to orbit ===
A space gun by itself is not capable of placing objects into a stable orbit around the object (planet or otherwise) they are launched from. The orbit is a parabolic orbit, a hyperbolic orbit, or part of an elliptic orbit which ends at the planet's surface at the point of launch or another point. This means that an uncorrected ballistic payload will always strike the planet within its first orbit unless the velocity was so high as to reach or exceed escape velocity. As a result, all payloads intended to reach a closed orbit need at least to perform some sort of course correction to create another orbit that does not intersect the planet's surface.

A rocket can be used for additional boost, as planned in both Project HARP and the Quicklaunch project. The magnitude of such correction may be small; for instance, the StarTram Generation 1 reference design involves a total of 0.6 km/s (1,300 mph) of rocket burn to raise perigee well above the atmosphere when entering an 8 km/s (18,000 mph) low Earth orbit.

In a three-body or larger system, a gravity assist trajectory might be available such that a carefully aimed escape velocity projectile would have its trajectory modified by the gravitational fields of other bodies in the system such that the projectile would eventually return to orbit the initial planet using only the launch delta-v.

Isaac Newton avoided this objection in his thought experiment by placing his notional cannon atop a tall mountain and positing negligible air resistance. If in a stable orbit, the projectile would circle the planet and return to the altitude of launch after one orbit (see Newton's cannonball).

=== Acceleration ===
For a space gun with a gun barrel of length ($l$), and the needed velocity ($v_e$), the acceleration ($a$) is provided by the following formula:

$$a = \frac{v_e^2}{2l}$$

For instance, with a space gun with a vertical "gun barrel" through both the Earth's crust and the troposphere, totalling ~60 km (37 miles) of length ($l$), and a velocity ($v_e$) enough to escape the Earth's gravity (escape velocity, which is 11.2 km/s or 25,000 mph on Earth), the acceleration ($a$) would theoretically be more than 1,000 m/s^{2} (3,300 ft/s^{2}), which is more than 100 g-forces, which is about 3 times the human tolerance to g-forces of maximum 20 to 35 g during the ~10 seconds such a firing would take. This calculation does not take into account the decreasing escape velocity at higher altitudes.

== Practical attempts ==
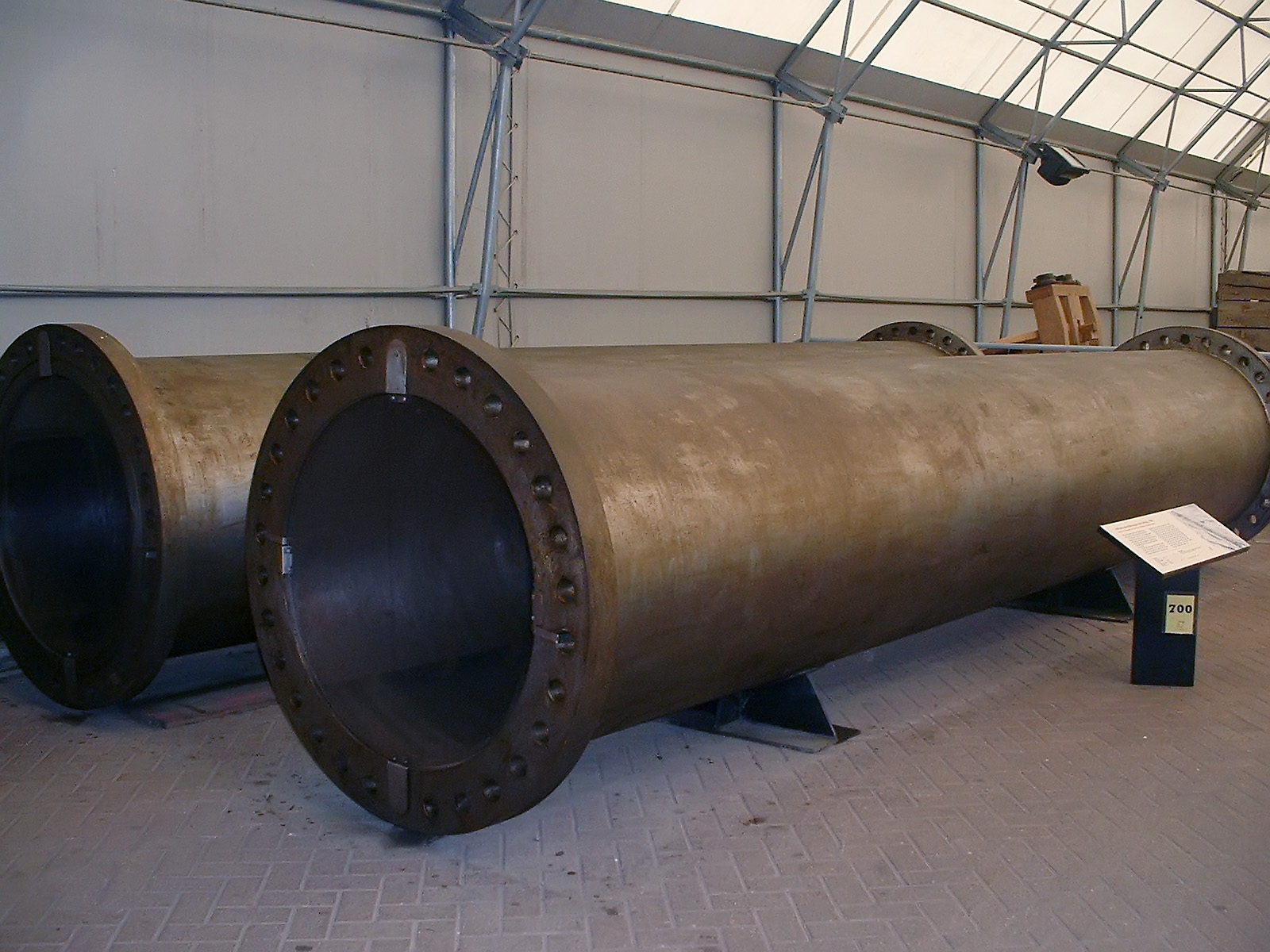
Two sections of the Project Babylon gun

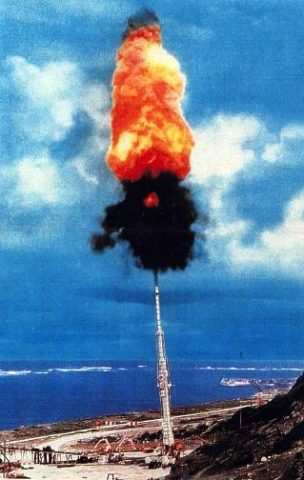
Project HARP, a prototype of a space gun.

=== V3 Cannon (1944-45) ===
The German V-3 cannon program during World War II was an attempt to build something approaching a space gun. Based in the Pas-de-Calais area of France, it was planned to be more devastating than the other Nazi 'Vengeance weapons'. The cannon was capable of launching 140 kg (310 lb), 15 cm (5.9 in) diameter shells over a distance of 88 km (55 mi). It was destroyed by RAF bombing using Tallboy blockbuster bombs in July 1944. The V-3 cannon used staged propulsion, which gave it a far greater range.

=== Super High Altitude Research Project (1985-95) ===
The US Ballistic Missile Defense program sponsored the Super High Altitude Research Project (SHARP) in the 1980s. Developed at Lawrence Livermore Laboratory, it is a light-gas gun and has been used to test fire objects at Mach 9.

=== Project Babylon (1988-90) ===
The most prominent recent attempt to make a space gun was artillery engineer Gerald Bull's Project Babylon, which was also known as the 'Iraqi supergun' by the media. During Project Babylon, Bull used his experience from Project HARP to build a massive cannon for Saddam Hussein, leader of Ba'athist Iraq. Bull was assassinated before the project was completed.

=== Quicklaunch (1996-2016) ===
After cancellation of SHARP, lead developer John Hunter founded the Jules Verne Launcher Company in 1996 and the Quicklaunch company. As of September 2012, Quicklaunch was seeking to raise $500 million to build a gun that could refuel a propellant depot or send bulk materials into space.

Ram accelerators have also been proposed as an alternative to light-gas guns. Other proposals use electromagnetic techniques for accelerating the payload, such as coilguns and railguns.

== In fiction ==
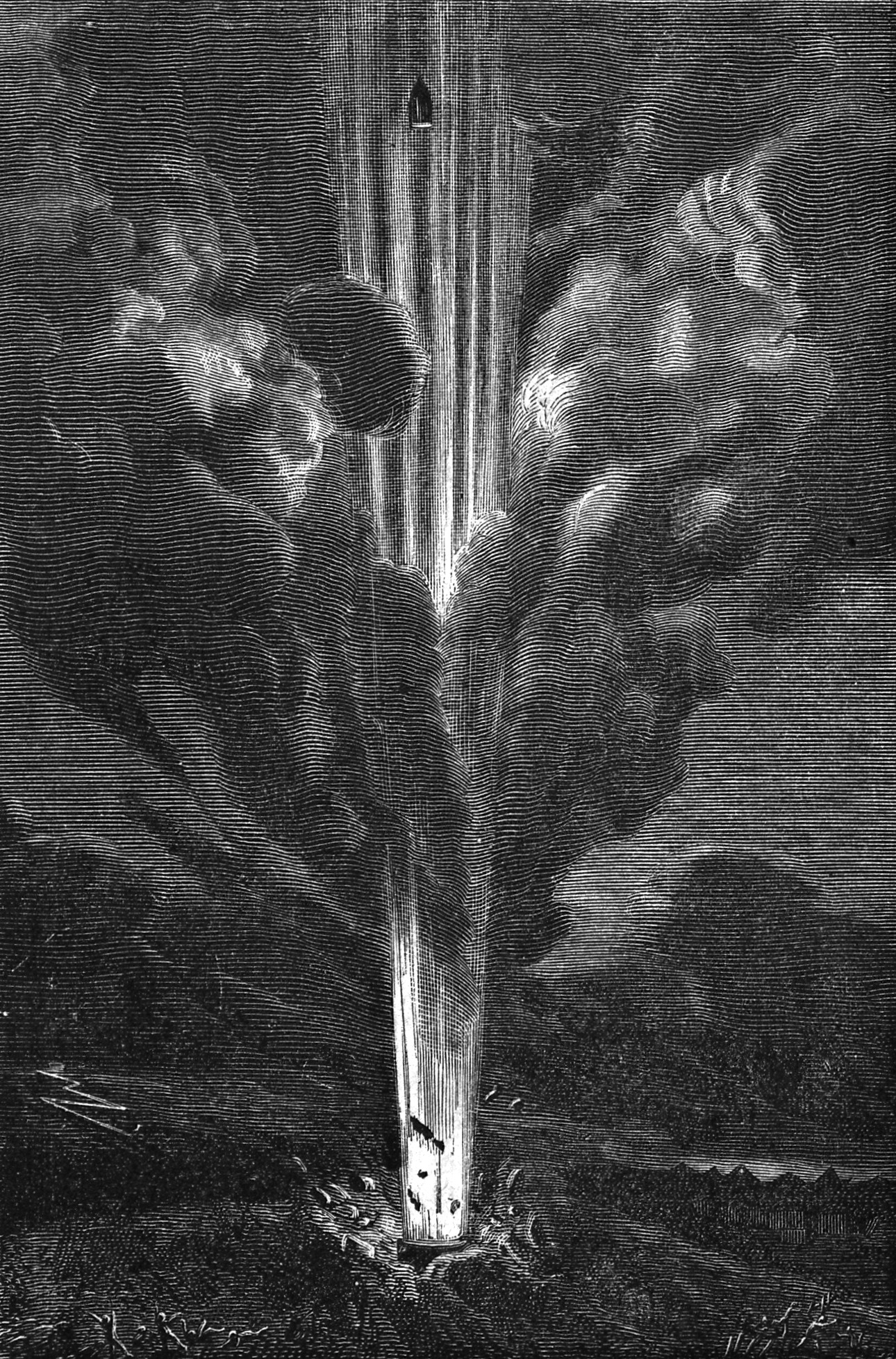
The firing of a space gun in Jules Verne's From the Earth to the Moon

The first publication of the concept may be Newton's cannonball in his 1728 book A Treatise of the System of the World, although it was primarily used as a thought experiment regarding gravity.

Perhaps the most famous representations of a space gun appear in Jules Verne's 1865 novel From the Earth to the Moon and his 1869 novel Around the Moon (loosely interpreted into the 1902 film Le Voyage dans la Lune), in which astronauts fly to the Moon aboard a ship launched from a cannon. Another famous example is used by the Martians to launch their invasion in H. G. Wells' 1897 book The War of the Worlds. Wells also used the concept in the climax of the 1936 film Things to Come. In one of the first Polish Sci-Fi novels, On the Silver Globe by Jerzy Żuławski, published in 1903, astronauts are launched to the Moon using a space gun. The device was featured in films as late as 1967, such as Jules Verne's Rocket to the Moon.

In the 1991 video game Ultima: Worlds of Adventure 2: Martian Dreams, Percival Lowell builds a space gun to send a spacecraft to Mars.

The 1992 video game Steel Empire, a shoot 'em up with steampunk aesthetics, features a space gun in its seventh level that is used by the main villain General Styron to launch himself to the Moon.

The 2008 video game Metal Gear Solid 4: Guns of the Patriots saw a railgun repurposed for use as a space gun. Formerly used in Metal Gear Solid (1998) to terrorise the world with untraceable nuclear strikes on any location, this railgun was designed as a weapon capable of outmatching and downing ICBMs in order to obtain nuclear dominance over the entire planet. Because of its history and design, it remained the only unregulated weapon in the world still powerful enough to conduct orbital strikes, and thus was used to assault the global satellite network in order to weaken an artificial intelligence system that exerted complete control on most aspects of life.

In Hannu Rajaniemi's 2012 novel The Fractal Prince, a space gun at the "Jannah-of-the-cannon", powered by a 150-kiloton nuclear bomb, is used to launch a spaceship from Earth.

The 2015 video game SOMA features a space gun used to launch satellites.

Gerald Bull's assassination and the Project Babylon gun were also the starting point for Frederick Forsyth's 1994 novel The Fist of God. In Larry Bond's 2001 novella and 2015 novel Lash-Up, China uses a space gun to destroy American GPS satellites.

In the 2004 role-playing game Paper Mario: The Thousand-Year Door, a village of Bob-ombs operates a space gun to send Paper Mario and company to the X-Naut's base on the Moon.

Gerald Bull and Project Babylon are integral to the plot of Louise Penny's 2015 novel The Nature of the Beast.

== See also ==
- Geostationary orbit: circular orbit 35,786 km (22,236 miles) above the Earth used by communications satellites
- Newton's cannonball
- The Fist of God
- SHARP
- Quicklaunch
- SpinLaunch
- StarTram
- Mass driver
- Space elevator
- Launch loop
- Lightcraft
- Space fountain
- Tether propulsion
- Non-rocket spacelaunch
