= Marlet =

Marlet is a surname. Notable people with the surname include:

- Christiane Marlet (born 1954), French former sprinter
- Jean-Henri Marlet (1771–1847), French painter
- Nico Marlet, French-American animator
- Steve Marlet (born 1974), French footballer

== See also ==
- Marlett, typeface
- Martlet (disambiguation)
- Marlette (disambiguation)
