= Launch Communications Act =

2024 United States federal law on commercial space launch spectrum

118th United States Congress
- Enacted by: 118th United States Congress
- Enacted: September 26, 2024
- Signed by: Joe Biden
- Signed: September 26, 2024
- Bill citation: H.R. 682; S. 1648

Related legislation
- Commercial Space Launch Competitiveness Act

The Launch Communications Act (LCA) is a United States federal law enacted on September 26, 2024. It directs the Federal Communications Commission (FCC) to allocate radio frequency spectrum for commercial space launch and reentry communications, replacing the prior system of case-by-case temporary authorisations.

The bill passed the United States Senate by unanimous consent and the United States House of Representatives by voice vote.

== Background ==
Before the act, commercial launch operators relied on special temporary authority (STA) licences issued by the FCC for each mission, creating uncertainty for operators with increasing launch frequency. According to U.S. Senator Eric Schmitt, the act was intended to modernise the FCC’s spectrum licensing process and reduce regulatory burdens on the commercial space industry. The act directs the FCC to allocate spectrum in the 2025–2110 MHz, 2200–2290 MHz, and 2360–2395 MHz bands for commercial launch and reentry use, and to establish service rules and licensing procedures.

The FCC had previously made limited spectrum available in the 2200–2290 MHz band in 2021. The LCA required additional allocations and the establishment of a permanent licensing framework.
