= John Hunter (scientist) =

American projectile researcher (born 1955)

John Hunter (born November 14, 1955) is an American projectile researcher, who developed the 1994 "supergun" Super High Altitude Research Project (SHARP) at the Lawrence Livermore National Laboratory. The ultimate aim of his research is to shoot payloads into space, at less than one tenth of the cost of unmanned rockets. John Hunter was the director of Quicklaunch until 2012 and currently runs a startup called Green Launch that is developing a light-gas gun concept

== See also ==
- Gerald Bull
- Non-rocket spacelaunch
