= Space launch =

Earliest phase of a flight that reaches space

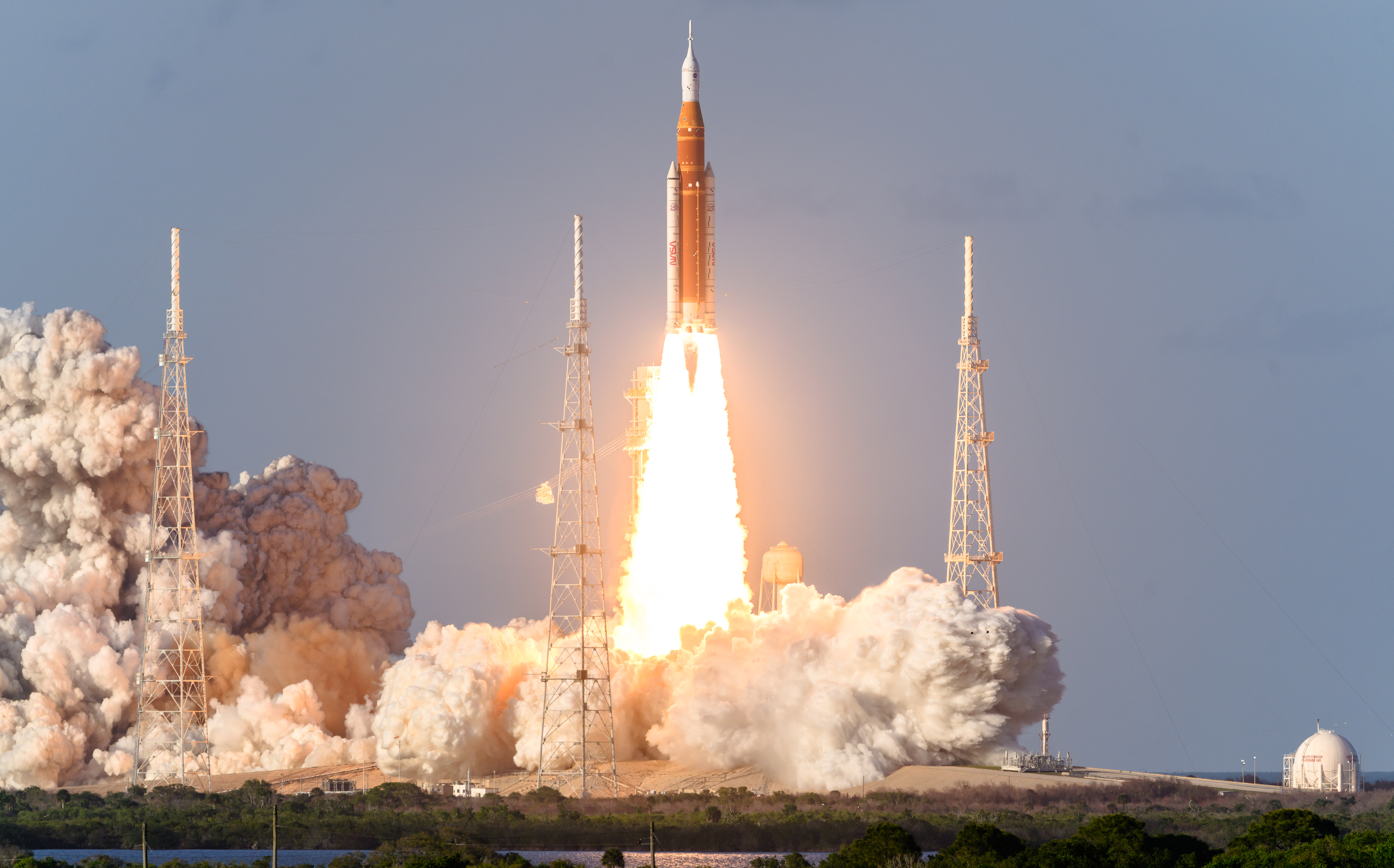
The Space Launch System of Artemis II.

A space launch is the phase of a spaceflight mission during which a launch vehicle reaches space. The launch may be sub-orbital or the launch may continue until the vehicle reaches orbit. A space launch begins at a launch pad, which may be on land or at sea, or when the launch vehicle is released mid-air from an aircraft.

== History ==
Following the end of the Space Race, spaceflight has been characterized by greater international cooperation, cheaper access to low Earth orbit and an expansion of commercial ventures. Interplanetary probes have visited all of the planets in the Solar System, and humans have remained in orbit for long periods aboard space stations such as Mir and the International Space Station (ISS). Most recently, China has emerged as the third nation with the capability to launch independent crewed missions, while operators in the commercial sector have developed reusable booster systems and craft launched from airborne platforms. In 2020, SpaceX became the first commercial operator to successfully launch a crewed mission to the ISS with Crew Dragon Demo-2.

== Rocket propulsion ==
Although alternatives have been proposed for launches from Earth into space, the only means used to date has been rocket propulsion. Rockets using both liquid propellant and solid propellant have been used for space launch.

== Spacecraft and crew ==
Most space launches carry a spacecraft that does not include people. The payload may be a robotic spacecraft or a warhead. In contrast, human spaceflight missions are launched with astronaut crew or passengers on board.

== Distributed launch ==
Distributed launch involves the accomplishment of a goal with multiple spacecraft launches. A large spacecraft such as the International Space Station can be constructed by assembling modules in orbit, or in-space propellant transfer conducted to greatly increase the delta-V capabilities of a cislunar or deep space vehicle. Distributed launch enables space missions that are not possible with single launch architectures.

== Issues with reaching space ==
=== Definition of outer space ===
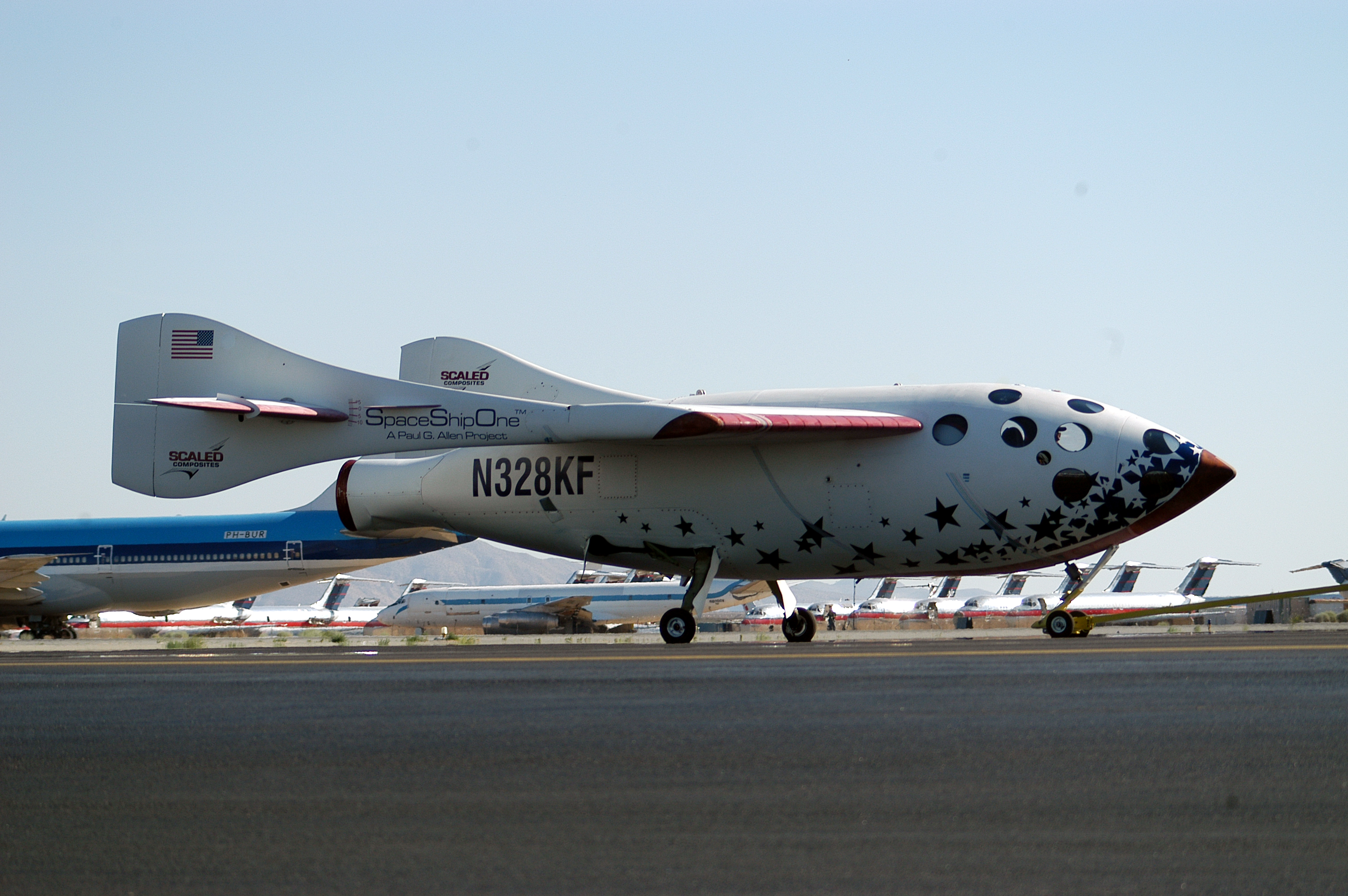
SpaceShipOne completed the first human private spaceflight in 2004, reaching an altitude of 100.12 km (62.21 mi).

There is no clear boundary between Earth's atmosphere and space, as the density of the atmosphere gradually decreases as the altitude increases. There are several standard boundary designations, namely:

- The Fédération Aéronautique Internationale has established the Kármán line at an altitude of 100 km (62 mi) as a working definition for the boundary between aeronautics and astronautics. This is used because at an altitude of about 100 km (62 mi), as Theodore von Kármán calculated, a vehicle would have to travel faster than orbital velocity to derive sufficient aerodynamic lift from the atmosphere to support itself.
- Until 2021, the United States designated people who travel above an altitude of 50 mi (80 km) as astronauts. Astronaut wings are now only awarded to spacecraft crew members that "demonstrated activities during flight that were essential to public safety, or contributed to human space flight safety".
- NASA's Space Shuttle used 400,000 ft, or 75.76 miles (120 km), as its re-entry altitude (termed the Entry Interface), which roughly marks the boundary where atmospheric drag becomes noticeable, thus beginning the process of switching from steering with thrusters to maneuvering with aerodynamic control surfaces.

In 2009, scientists reported detailed measurements with a Supra-Thermal Ion Imager (an instrument that measures the direction and speed of ions), which allowed them to establish a boundary at 118 km (73.3 mi) above Earth. The boundary represents the midpoint of a gradual transition over tens of kilometers from the relatively gentle winds of the Earth's atmosphere to the more violent flows of charged particles in space, which can reach speeds well over 268 m/s (880 ft/s).

=== Energy ===
By definition for spaceflight to occur, sufficient altitude is necessary. This implies a minimum gravitational potential energy needs to be overcome: for the Kármán line; this is approximately 1 MJ/kg. W=mgh, m=1 kg, g=9.82 m/s^{2}, h=10^{5}m. W=1*9.82*10^{5}≈10^{6}J/kg=1MJ/kg

In practice, a higher energy than this is needed to be expended due to losses such as airdrag, propulsive efficiency, cycle efficiency of engines that are employed and gravity drag.

In the past fifty years, spaceflight has usually meant remaining in space for a period of time, rather than going up and immediately falling back to earth. This entails orbit, which is mostly a matter of velocity, not altitude, although that does not mean air friction and relevant altitudes in relation to that, and orbit, do not need to be considered. At much higher altitudes than many orbital ones maintained by satellites, altitude begins to become a larger factor and speed a lesser one. At lower altitudes, due to the high speed required to remain in orbit, air friction is an important consideration affecting satellites, much more than in the popular image of space. At even lower altitudes, balloons, with no forward velocity, can serve many of the roles satellites play.

=== G-forces ===
Many cargos, particularly humans, have a limiting g-force that they can survive. For humans this is about 3–6 g. Some launchers such as gun launchers would give accelerations in the hundred or thousands of g and thus are completely unsuitable.

=== Reliability ===
Launchers vary with respect to their reliability for achieving the mission.

=== Safety ===
Safety is the probability of causing injury or loss of life. Unreliable launchers are not necessarily unsafe, whereas reliable launchers are usually, but not invariably safe.

Apart from catastrophic failure of the launch vehicle itself, other safety hazards include depressurisation, and the Van Allen radiation belts which preclude orbits which spend long periods within them.

=== Trajectory optimization ===
Trajectory optimization is the process of designing a trajectory that minimizes (or maximizes) some measure of performance while satisfying a set of constraints. Generally speaking, trajectory optimization is a technique for computing an open-loop solution to an optimal control problem. It is often used for systems where computing the full closed-loop solution is not required, impractical or impossible. If a trajectory optimization problem can be solved at a rate given by the inverse of the Lipschitz constant, then it can be used iteratively to generate a closed-loop solution in the sense of Caratheodory. If only the first step of the trajectory is executed for an infinite-horizon problem, then this is known as Model Predictive Control (MPC).

Although the idea of trajectory optimization has been around for hundreds of years (calculus of variations, brachistochrone problem), it only became practical for real-world problems with the advent of the computer. Many of the original applications of trajectory optimization were in the aerospace industry, computing rocket and missile launch trajectories. More recently, trajectory optimization has also been used in a wide variety of industrial process and robotics applications.

=== Impact ===
Space launches have shown among other things to increase aluminium concentration and pH-Levels around launch sites. That said proper regulation and measures can reduce and even increase environmental protection of launches.

Furthermore, soot and debris from launches, particularly failed launches, have literally negatively impacted wide areas below. Leftover of launches are for example dumped in the ocean at places like the Pacific Ocean area called the spacecraft cemetery.

Beside ecological environments, lands and their communities, particularly indigenous peoples, have been colonized to build the necessary infrastructure, disregarding them without reaching out for consultation or consent.

Many rockets use fossil fuels, some launch systems use hydrogen, while some rocket manufacturers (i.e. ArianeGroup) are using different launch fuels (such as methane produced from biomass).

Launches exhaust often water vapor, which is a potent greenhouse gas and at high altitudes not very common. Also methane it self, which is used as a fuel, is a potent greenhouse gas.

==== Carbon emissions ====
As the number of rocket launches is expected to increase, the cumulative effect that launching into space has on Earth is expected to be significant and not to be underestimated. A single common Falcon 9 launch emits carbon dioxide into the mesosphere of about 26 km^{3}. A SpaceX Falcon Heavy rocket for instance burns through 400 metric tons of kerosene and emits more carbon dioxide in a few minutes than an average car would in more than two centuries.

== Sustained spaceflight ==
=== Suborbital launch ===
Sub-orbital space flight is any space launch that reaches space without making a full orbit around the planet, and requires a maximum speed of around 1 km/s to reach space, and up to 7 km/s for longer distance such as an intercontinental space flight. An example of a sub-orbital flight would be a ballistic missile, or future tourist flight such as Virgin Galactic, or an intercontinental transport flight like SpaceLiner. Any space launch without an orbit-optimization correction to achieve a stable orbit will result in a suborbital space flight, unless there is sufficient thrust to leave orbit completely (See Space gun#Getting to orbit).

=== Orbital launch ===
In addition, if orbit is required, then a much greater amount of energy must be generated in order to give the craft some sideways speed. The speed that must be achieved depends on the altitude of the orbit – less speed is needed at high altitude. However, after allowing for the extra potential energy of being at higher altitudes, overall more energy is used reaching higher orbits than lower ones.

The speed needed to maintain an orbit near the Earth's surface corresponds to a sideways speed of about 7.8 km/s (17,400 mph), an energy of about 30MJ/kg. This is several times the energy per kg of practical rocket propellant mixes.

Gaining the kinetic energy is awkward as the airdrag tends to slow the spacecraft, so rocket-powered spacecraft generally fly a compromise trajectory that leaves the thickest part of the atmosphere very early on, and then fly on for example, a Hohmann transfer orbit to reach the particular orbit that is required. This minimises the airdrag as well as minimising the time that the vehicle spends holding itself up. Airdrag is a significant issue with essentially all proposed and current launch systems, although usually less so than the difficulty of obtaining enough kinetic energy to simply reach orbit.

=== Escape velocity ===
If the Earth's gravity is to be overcome entirely, then sufficient energy must be obtained by a spacecraft to exceed the depth of the gravity potential energy well. Once this has occurred, provided the energy is not lost in any non-conservative way, then the vehicle will leave the influence of the Earth. The depth of the potential well depends on the vehicle's position, and the energy depends on the vehicle's speed. If the kinetic energy exceeds the potential energy then escape occurs. At the Earth's surface this occurs at a speed of 11.2 km/s (25,000 mph), but in practice a much higher speed is needed due to airdrag.

== Types of space launch ==
=== Rocket launch ===
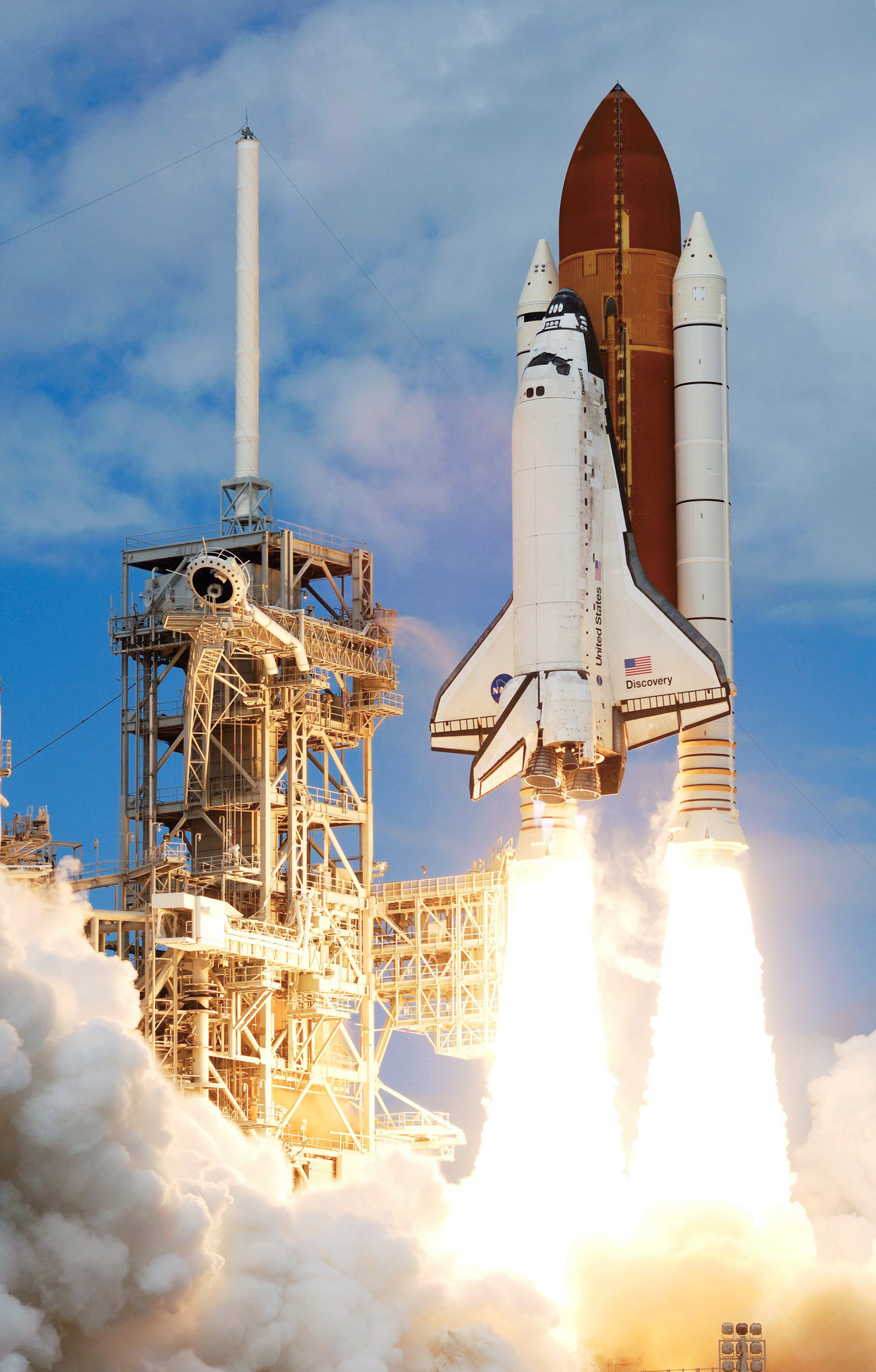
STS-120 launch

Larger rockets are normally launched from a launch pad that provides stable support until a few seconds after ignition. Due to their high exhaust velocity—2,500 to 4,500 m/s (9,000 to 16,200 km/h; 5,600 to 10,100 mph)—rockets are particularly useful when very high speeds are required, such as orbital speed at approximately 7,800 m/s (28,000 km/h; 17,000 mph). Spacecraft delivered into orbital trajectories become artificial satellites, which are used for many commercial purposes. Indeed, rockets remain the only way to launch spacecraft into orbit and beyond. They are also used to rapidly accelerate spacecraft when they change orbits or de-orbit for landing. Also, a rocket may be used to soften a hard parachute landing immediately before touchdown (see retrorocket).

=== Non-rocket launch ===
Non-rocket spacelaunch refers to theoretical concepts for launch into space where much of the speed and altitude needed to achieve orbit is provided by a propulsion technique that is not subject to the limits of the rocket equation. Although all space launches to date have been rockets, a number of alternatives to rockets have been proposed. In some systems, such as a combination launch system, skyhook, rocket sled launch, rockoon, or air launch, a portion of the total delta-v may be provided, either directly or indirectly, by using rocket propulsion.

Present-day launch costs are very high – $2,500 to $25,000 per kilogram from Earth to low Earth orbit (LEO). As a result, launch costs are a large percentage of the cost of all space endeavors. If launch can be made cheaper, the total cost of space missions will be reduced. Due to the exponential nature of the rocket equation, providing even a small amount of the velocity to LEO by other means has the potential of greatly reducing the cost of getting to orbit.

Launch costs in the hundreds of dollars per kilogram would make possible many proposed large-scale space projects such as space colonization, space-based solar power and terraforming Mars.

== Extraterrestrial ==
There have been some extraterrestrial sites of space launches. Mostly from the Moon, such as the first, by the Apollo program return launches from the respective moonbases. But also from asteroids.

Lunar ascent of the ascent stage from the last Apollo lunar base at Taurus–Littrow (Apollo 17, 1972).
