= Rocket sled launch =

Proposed method for launching space vehicles

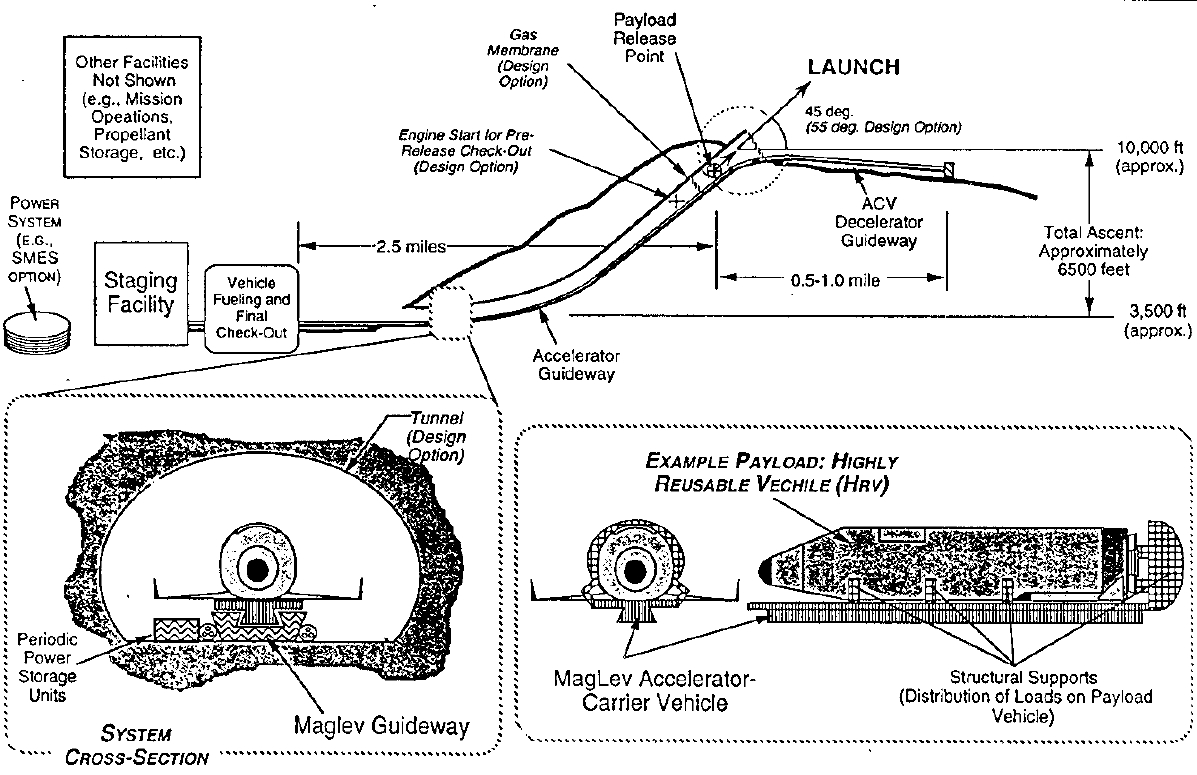
An example of rocket sled launch assist: NASA's Maglifter proposal for giving a 500+ ton rocket initial velocity from a mountain.

A rocket sled launch, also known as ground-based launch assist, catapult launch assist, and sky-ramp launch, is a proposed method for launching space vehicles. With this concept the launch vehicle is supported by an eastward pointing rail or maglev track that goes up the side of a mountain while an externally applied force is used to accelerate the launch vehicle to a given velocity. Using an externally applied force for the initial acceleration reduces the propellant the launch vehicle needs to carry to reach orbit. This allows the launch vehicle to carry a larger payload and reduces the cost of getting to orbit. When the amount of velocity added to the launch vehicle by the ground accelerator becomes great enough, single-stage-to-orbit flight with a reusable launch vehicle becomes possible.

For hypersonic research in general, tracks at Holloman Air Force Base have tested, as of 2011, small rocket sleds moving at up to 6453 mph (2,885 m/s; Mach 8.5).

Effectively a sky ramp would make the most expensive, first stage of a rocket fully reusable since the sled is returned to its starting position to be refueled, and may be reused in the order of hours after use. Present launch vehicles have performance-driven costs of thousands of dollars per kilogram of dry weight; sled launch would aim to reduce performance requirements and amortize hardware expenses over frequent, repeated launches. Designs for mountain based inclined-rail sleds often use jet engines or rockets to accelerate the spacecraft mounted on it. Electromagnetic methods (such as Bantam, Maglifter, StarTram, and Variable Pitch Screw Launch) are other techniques investigated to accelerate a rocket before launch, potentially scalable to greater rocket masses and velocities than air launch.

== Overview of the problem ==
Rockets carrying their own propellant with them use the vast majority of that propellant at the beginning of their journey to accelerate most of that very same propellant, as enshrined in the rocket equation. For example, the Space Shuttle used more than a third of its fuel just to reach 1,000 mph (1,600 km/h). If that energy was provided without (yet, or at all) using a propellant the rocket carries, its propellant need would be much reduced, and its payload could be a larger fraction of its liftoff mass, increasing its efficiency.

With chemical rockets, the mass ratio between the fully fueled launch vehicle and the payload delivered to a destination increases exponentially as the required mission delta-v increases. As a result, missions requiring higher delta-v demand disproportionately larger and more complex vehicle architectures relative to the mission's payload mass. Empirical analyses suggest that launch and mission costs also scale exponentially with increasing delta-v, contributing to the high cost of missions beyond low Earth orbit, such as Mars sample-return mission, which has been estimated to cost approximately $11 billion.

== An example ==
Due to factors including the exponential nature of the rocket equation and higher propulsive efficiency than if a rocket takes off stationary, a NASA Maglifter study estimated that a 270 m/s (600 mph) launch of an ELV rocket from a 3000-meter altitude mountain peak could increase payload to low Earth orbit by 80% compared to the same rocket from a conventional launch pad. Mountains of such height are available within the mainland U.S. for the easiest logistics, or nearer to the Equator for a little more gain from Earth's rotation. Among other possibilities, a larger single-stage-to-orbit (SSTO) could be reduced in liftoff mass by 35% with such launch assist, dropping to 4 instead of 6 engines in one case considered.

At an anticipated efficiency close to 90%, electrical energy consumed per launch of a 500-ton rocket would be around 30 gigajoules (8,300 kWh) (each kilowatt-hour costing a few cents at the current cost of electricity in the United States), aside from any additional losses in energy storage. It is a system with low marginal costs dominated by initial capital costs Although a fixed site, it was estimated to provide a substantial net payload increase for a high portion of the varying launch azimuths needed by different satellites, with rocket maneuvering during the early stage of post-launch ascent (an alternative to adding electric propulsion for later orbital inclination change). Maglev guideway costs were estimated as $10–20 million per mile in the 1994 study, which had anticipated annual maglev maintenance costs on the order of 1% of capital costs.

== Benefits of ground-based launch assist ==
Rocket sled launch helps a vehicle gain speed and altitude, as proposals commonly involve a ramp that curves up a mountain to direct vehicles skyward.

The primary advantage is the offloading of some of the delta-v requirement from the rocket to the ground-based infrastructure. This can be a cost effective trade if the ground-based infrastructure is used frequently enough, as the operating costs of the infrastructure can be significantly lower and its capital cost will typically scale with the square or cube of the imparted delta-v as opposed to with the exponent of delta-v.

Advantages to any launch system that starts from high altitudes include reduce gravity drag (the cost of lifting fuel in a gravity well). The thinner air will reduce air resistance and allow more efficient engine geometries. Rocket nozzles have different shapes (expansion ratios) to maximize thrust at different air pressures. (Though NASA's aerospike engine for the Lockheed Martin X-33 was designed to change geometry to remain efficient at a variety of different pressures, the aerospike engine had added weight and complexity; X-33 funding was canceled in 2001; and other benefits from launch assist would remain even if aerospike engines reached flight testing).

For example, the air is 39% thinner at 2500 meters. The more efficient rocket plume geometry and the reduced air friction allows the engine to be 5% more efficient per amount of fuel burned.

Another advantage to high altitude launches is that it eliminates the need to throttle back the engine when the max Q limit is attained. Rockets launched in thick atmosphere can go so fast that air resistance may cause structural damage. Engines are throttled back when max Q is reached, until the rocket is high enough that they can resume full power. The Atlas V 551 gives an example of this. It reaches its max Q at 30,000 feet. Its engine is throttled back to 60% thrust for 30 seconds. This reduced acceleration adds to the gravity drag the rocket must overcome. Additionally, space craft engines concerned with max Q are more complex as they must be throttled during launch.

A launch from high altitude need not throttle back at max Q as it starts above the thickest portion of the Earth's atmosphere.

Debora A. Grant and James L. Rand, in "The Balloon Assisted Launch System – A Heavy Lift Balloon", wrote: "It was established some time ago that a ground launched rocket capable of reaching 20 km would be able to reach an altitude of almost 100km if it was launched from 20km." They suggest that small rockets are lifted above the majority of the atmosphere by balloon in order to avoid the problems discussed above.

== Compatibility with reusable launch vehicles ==
A sled track that gave a Mach 2 or greater launch assist could reduce the fuel to orbit by 40% or more, while helping counter the weight penalty when aiming to make a fully reusable launch vehicle. Angled at 55° to vertical, a track on a tall mountain could allow a single stage to orbit reusable vehicle with no new technology.

== Rocket sled launches in fiction ==
- Robert A. Heinlein used a lunar maglev launcher in his 1966 novel The Moon is a Harsh Mistress. One on Earth was built by the novel's end.
- Dean Ing used a similar system in his 1988 novel The Big Lifters.
- Fireball XL5 was launched on a sled from sea level.
- Silver Tower has a rocket launch sled, used to assist in the takeoff of the hypersonic spaceplane America.
- The 1951 film version of When Worlds Collide used a rocket sled to launch the Ark, although the book did not.
- Borderlands: The Pre-Sequel has a rocket sled in its initial cut-scene.
- Permission To Die (graphic novel) in an original James Bond story by Mike Grell, a sled-propelled rocket plays a crucial element to the plot.
- Interstella 5555 has the Crescendolls band leaving Earth using a rocket sled to assist with takeoff.
- Ace Combat 5: The Unsung War is a video game that features a mission requiring a rocket sled site to be defended from an air raid during a launch.
- Mobile Suit Gundam: Char's Counterattack shows a rocket sled was used to assist in the takeoff of the civilian space shuttle.
- The 2015 film Tomorrowland depicts a vertical-launch rocket sled used in a civilian "starport" as the main character explores the titular city.

== See also ==
- Rocket sled
- Laser propulsion
- Non-rocket spacelaunch
- Silbervogel
- Spaceplane
- StarTram
- Inductrack
- Railgun
- Ram accelerator
- CAM ship
- Fighter catapult ship
- Coilgun
- Mass driver
- Hopper (spacecraft)
- Index of aviation articles
