= Voitenko compressor =

Shockwave generator

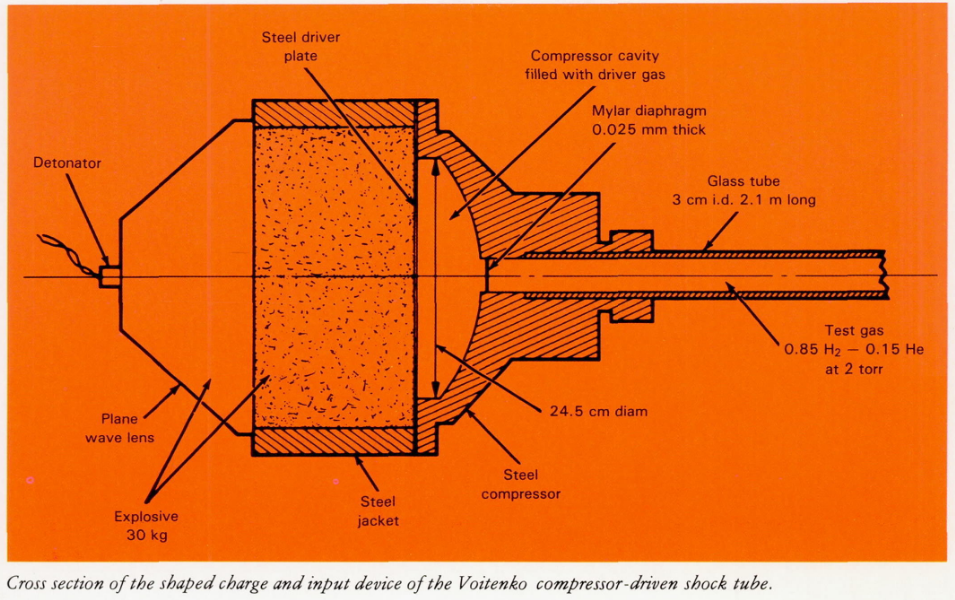
Cross-section diagram of a Voitenko compressor.

The Voitenko compressor is a shaped charge adapted from its original purpose of piercing thick steel armour to the task of accelerating shock waves. It was proposed by Anatoly Emelyanovich Voitenko (Анатолий Емельянович Войтенко), a Soviet scientist, in 1964. It slightly resembles a wind tunnel.

The Voitenko compressor initially separates a test gas from a shaped charge with a malleable steel plate. When the shaped charge detonates, most of its energy is focused on the steel plate, driving it forward and pushing the test gas ahead of it. Ames Research Center translated this idea into a self-destroying shock tube. A 30-kilogram (66 lb) shaped charge accelerated the gas in a 3-cm glass-walled tube 2 meters in length. The velocity of the resulting shock wave was a phenomenal 67 km/s (220,000 ft/s). The apparatus exposed to the detonation was, of course, completely destroyed, but not before useful data was extracted. In a typical Voitenko compressor, a shaped charge accelerates hydrogen gas, which in turn accelerates a thin disk up to about 40 km/s. A slight modification to the Voitenko compressor concept is a super-compressed detonation, a device that uses a compressible liquid or solid fuel in the steel compression chamber instead of a traditional gas mixture. A further extension of this technology is the explosive diamond anvil cell, utilizing multiple opposed shaped-charge jets projected at a single steel-encapsulated fuel, such as hydrogen. The fuels used in these devices, along with the secondary combustion reactions and long blast impulse, produce similar conditions to those encountered in fuel-air and thermobaric explosives.

This method of detonation produces energies over 100 keV (~10^{9} K temperatures), suitable not only for nuclear fusion, but other higher-order quantum reactions as well. The UTIAS explosive-driven-implosion facility was used to produce stable, centered and focused hemispherical implosions to generate neutrons from D–D reactions. The simplest and most direct method proved to be in a predetonated stoichiometric mixture of deuterium and oxygen. The other successful method was using a miniature Voitenko-type compressor, where a plane diaphragm was driven by the implosion wave into a secondary small spherical cavity that contained pure deuterium gas at one atmosphere. In brief, PETN solid explosive is used to form a hemispherical shell (3–6 mm thick) in a 20-cm diameter hemispherical cavity milled in a massive steel chamber. The remaining volume is filled with a stoichiometric mixture of (H_{2} or D_{2} and O_{2}). This mixture is detonated by a very short, thin exploding wire located at the geometric center. The arrival of the detonation wave at the spherical surface instantly and simultaneously fires the explosive liner. The detonation wave in the explosive liner hits the metal cavity, reflects, and implodes on the preheated burnt gases, focuses at the center of the hemisphere (50 microseconds after the initiation of the exploding wire) and reflects, leaving behind a very small pocket (1 mm) of extremely high-temperature, high-pressure and high-density plasma.

== See also ==
- Light-gas gun
