= Martlet (disambiguation) =

Martlet is an English heraldic charge depicting a stylized bird of the swallow family.

Martlet may also refer to:

== Technology ==
- Martlet (CU Spaceflight), a project of CU Spaceflight to develop a small rocket which can be launched from a balloon
- Martlet 3, and other Martlet projectiles during the US/Canada High Altitude Research Project (Project HARP)
- Southern Martlet, single-seat biplane sports aircraft
- Grumman Martlet, the original name given to Royal Navy Grumman F4F-4 Wildcat carrier fighters
- Martlet (missile), a rocket powered missile

== Other uses ==
- The Martlet, a student newspaper at the University of Victoria in Victoria, British Columbia, Canada
- McGill Martlets, the women's athletic teams that represent McGill University in Montreal, Quebec, Canada
- Martlet House, a building which was the Montreal headquarters of the Seagram Company
- Operation Martlet, a British diversionary operation in the Second World War in June 1944 in France
- Martlet, a major character in the video game Undertale Yellow
