= Super High Altitude Research Project =

U.S. government research project

The Super High Altitude Research Project (Super HARP, SHARP) was a U.S. government project conducting research into the firing of high-velocity projectiles high into the atmosphere using a two-stage light-gas gun, with the ultimate goal of propelling satellites into Earth orbit. Design work on the prototype space gun began as early as 1985 at the Lawrence Livermore National Laboratory in California and became operational in December 1992. It is the largest gas gun in the world.

== Design and operation ==
Rather than a single straight barrel, the SHARP gun uses an L-shape design with two separate sections; the 270 ft (82 m) long steel combustion section & pump tube section is connected to the 155 ft (47 m) long launch tube (or barrel) at a right angle. 100,000 kg (220,000 lb) rail-mounted sleds sit at both ends of the pump tube to absorb recoil energy from firing and a smaller 10,000 kg (22,000 lb) sled is mounted on a perpendicular set of tracks at the aft-end of the launch-tube near the junction point.

The firing sequence begins with the ignition of a methane gas mixture in the combustion section behind the piston at the far end of the pump tube. The resultant explosion rapidly drives the 1,000 kg (2,200 lb) steel piston down the pump tube and further compresses the pre-pressurized hydrogen gas that fills the other end of the pump tube. As the piston accelerates toward the junction point, it rapidly compresses the hydrogen gas in the pump tube to a pressure of 60,000 psi (4,100 atm). The small projectile, meanwhile, rests in the adjacent depressurized launch tube. As the hydrogen gas reaches maximum pressure, a coupling holding the projectile in place is destroyed and the hydrogen drives the projectile down a 4 in (100 mm) diameter barrel at extremely high velocities until it bursts through a thin plastic sheet covering the end of the gun. All recoil forces are absorbed by the rail-mounted sleds as they are propelled outwards along their tracks.

== Tests and cancellation ==
Headed by John Hunter, the SHARP gun fired projectiles using expanding hydrogen and achieved velocities of 3 km/s (6,700 mph) or Mach 8.8 for 5 kg (11 lb) projectiles. Had the project continued, there were plans to elevate the tube and begin space launch trials potentially reaching speeds of up to 7 km/s (16,000 mph), or about Mach 21.

The tests were designed as a precursor to the "Jules Verne Launcher," an even larger light-gas gun with a 3,500 m (11,500 ft) barrel length designed in the early 1990s for first-stage satellite launch. This was to cost $1 billion, but funding was not forthcoming and the project was eventually canceled in 1995. However, the SHARP gun continued to be used for high-speed tests in other areas of research, such as scramjet development.

The concept of ballistic escape velocity is well proven. The largest challenge is maintaining such high velocities, because air resistance and aerothermal heating will significantly slow down any such object.

== See also ==
- Quicklaunch, proposed by SHARP scientist John Hunter.
- Non-rocket spacelaunch
- Project HARP
- Verneshot
- Operation Plumbbob
