= Marolt =

Marolt is a surname. Notable people with the surname include:

- Bill Marolt (born 1943), American alpine ski racer, coach, and sports administrator
- Larissa Marolt (born 1992), Austrian fashion model and actress
- Max Marolt (1936–2003), American alpine skier
- Žan Marolt (1964–2009), Bosnian actor and TV personality
