= Marlette =

Marlette may refer to:

== People ==
- Bob Marlette (born 1955), American record producer
- Doug Marlette (1949–2007), American editorial and comic strip cartoonist and novelist

== Places in the United States ==
- Marlette, Michigan, a city
- Marlette Township, Michigan
- Marlette Lake, above Lake Tahoe, Nevada - see Marlette Lake Water System

== Other uses ==
- Marlette High School, Marlette, Michigan

== See also ==
- Fort Branch High School or Fort Branch Marlette High School, Fort Branch, Indiana
- Marlet, a surname
- Marlett, a typeface
