= Newton's cannonball =

Thought experiment about gravity

A cannon on top of a very high mountain shoots a cannonball horizontally. If the speed is low, the cannonball quickly falls back to Earth (A, B). At intermediate speeds, it will revolve around Earth along an elliptical orbit (C, D). Beyond the escape velocity, it will leave the Earth without returning (E).

Newton's cannonball was a thought experiment Isaac Newton used to hypothesize that the force of gravity was universal, and it was the key force for planetary motion. It appeared in his posthumously published 1728 work De mundi systemate (also published in English as A Treatise of the System of the World).

== Theory ==
In this experiment described near the start of his De mundi systemate, Newton visualizes a stone being projected from the top of a high mountain, and "that there is no air about the earth, or at least that it is endowed with little or no power of resisting".

As a gravitational force acts on the projectile, it will follow a different path depending on its initial velocity.

If the speed is low, it will simply fall back on Earth.

If the speed is the orbital speed at that altitude, it will go on circling around the Earth along a fixed circular orbit "and return to the mountain from which it was projected".

If the speed is higher than the orbital velocity, but not high enough to leave Earth altogether (lower than the escape velocity), it will continue revolving around Earth along an elliptical orbit.

If the speed is very high, it will leave Earth in a parabolic (at exactly escape velocity) or hyperbolic trajectory.

== Source ==
Newton's original plan for Philosophiæ Naturalis Principia Mathematica was that it should consist of two books, the first analyzing basic laws of motion, and the second applying them to the Solar System. In order to include more material on motion in resisting media, the first book was split into two; the succeeding (now third) book, originally written in a more popular style, was rewritten to be more mathematical. However, manuscripts of an earlier draft of this last book survived, and a version of it was published in 1728 as De mundi systemate; an English translation was also published earlier in 1728 under the name A Treatise of the System of the World. The thought experiment occurs near the start of this work.

== Other appearances ==
A photograph of page 6 from Newton's De mundi systemate (A Treatise of the System of the World), as it appears on the Voyager Golden Record

An image of the page from A Treatise of the System of the World showing Newton's diagram of this experiment was included on the Voyager Golden Record, as image #110.

== See also ==
- Mass#Newton's cannonball
- Space gun
- Physics
