= Ram accelerator =

Projectile launcher that uses supersonic fuel-air combustion outside of an engine

A ram accelerator is a device for accelerating projectiles or just a single projectile to extremely high speeds using jet-engine-like propulsion cycles based on ramjet or scramjet combustion processes. It is thought to be possible to achieve non-rocket spacelaunch with this technology.

It consists of a long tube (barrel) filled with a mixture of combustible gases with a frangible diaphragm at either end to contain the gases. The projectile is fired by another means (e.g., a light-gas gun or railgun) supersonically through the first diaphragm into the tube. Then the projectile burns the gases as fuel, because it is shaped like a ramjet or scramjet core, and accelerates under jet propulsion. Other physics come into play at higher velocities.

== Description ==
In a normal ramjet, air is compressed between a spike-shaped centerbody and an outer cowling, fuel is added and burned, and high speed exhaust gases are expanded supersonically out of the nozzle to generate thrust. In a ram accelerator, a projectile having a shape similar to the ramjet centerbody is fired, (often from a conventional gun), into the accelerator barrel, causing compression between the projectile and the barrel's walls. The barrel contains a pre-mixed gaseous fuel-air mixture. As the ram accelerator projectile compresses the fuel-air mixture, it is ignited and the combustion is stabilized at the base of the projectile. The resulting pressure differential generates a prodigious amount of thrust that can accelerate projectiles to in-tube Mach numbers greater than 8. Thus, if propellant mixtures with a speed of sound of 1000 m/s (e.g. fuel-rich H_{2}-O_{2} mixtures) are used, muzzle velocities in excess of 8000 m/s are possible.

To span a wide range in a typical ram accelerator system, multiple stages with propellants with different sound speeds are used to maintain high performance. Membranes or diaphragms that are easily punctured by the projectile are used to isolate the propellant stages. Each section is filled with a different fuel-air mixture chosen so that later sections have higher speeds of sound. As such, the ram can be maintained at optimal speeds of Mach 3–5 (relative to the mixture that it travels through) during its entire acceleration period. Ram accelerators optimized to use supersonic combustion modes can generate even higher velocities (Mach 6–8) due to the ability to combust fuel that is still moving at supersonic speed.

== Advantages ==
The chief advantage of a ram accelerator over a conventional gun is its scalability. In a normal gun, maximum pressure is exerted at the time of the charge ignition. As the projectile moves further down the barrel, the amount of acceleration upon the projectile decreases as the gas behind it expands, eventually reaching amounts trivial enough that a longer barrel is no longer justified. With a ram accelerator, the projectile is propelled primarily by the pressure generated by the reaction of the propellant gases burning just behind the projectile. This leads to constant pressure being put both on the gun and the projectile itself. Consequently, far longer barrels are possible than conventional guns, while still delivering a strong constant acceleration to the projectile.

== See also ==
- Helical railgun – Multi-turn railgun that reduces current by a factor equal to the number of turns
- Mass driver – Proposed spacelaunch method
- Plasma railgun – Linear accelerator
