= Light-gas gun =

Gun designed to generate very high speed

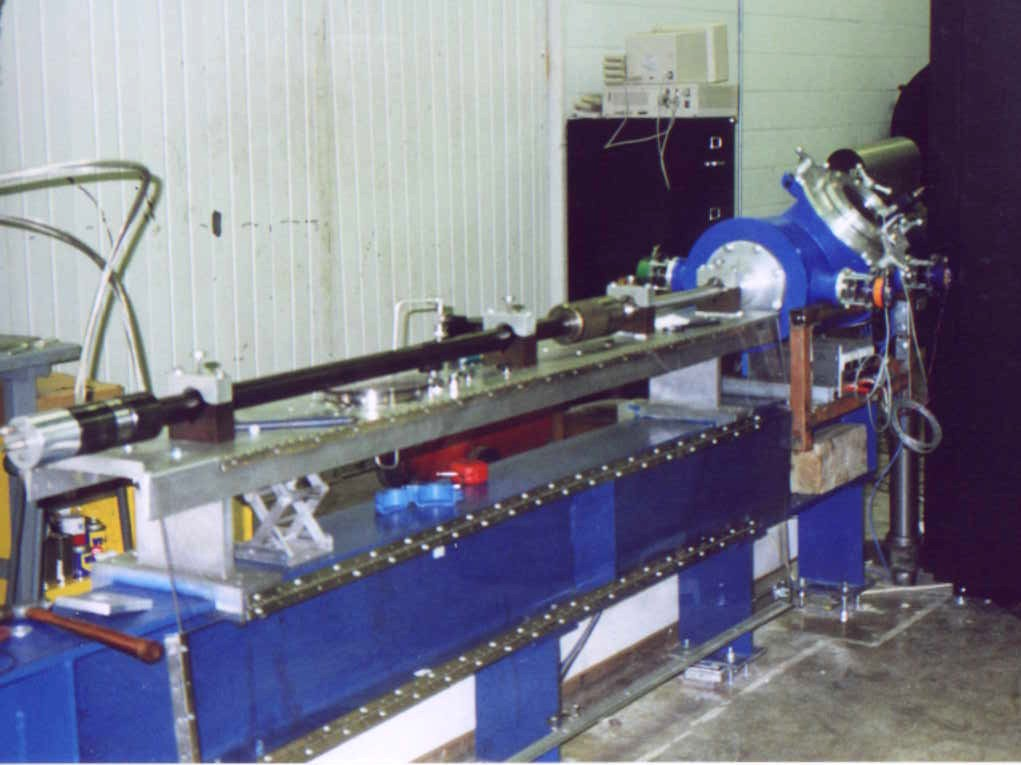
A light-gas gun at Rice University. Using hydrogen gas and powered by a shotgun shell, it achieves a velocity of 7 km/s. Used during the development of the Fermi Gamma-ray Space Telescope shield.

The light-gas gun is an apparatus for physics experiments. It is a highly specialized gun designed to generate extremely high velocities. It is usually used to study high-speed impact phenomena (hypervelocity research), such as the formation of impact craters by meteorites or the erosion of materials by micrometeoroids.

== Operation ==
A light-gas gun works on the same principle as a spring piston airgun. A large-diameter piston is used to force a gaseous working fluid through a smaller-diameter barrel containing the projectile to be accelerated. This reduction in diameter acts as a lever, increasing the speed while decreasing the pressure. In an airgun, the large piston is powered by a spring or compressed air, and the working fluid is atmospheric air.

In a light-gas gun, the piston is powered by a chemical reaction (usually gunpowder), and the working fluid is a lighter gas, such as helium or hydrogen (though helium is much safer to work with, hydrogen offers the best performance [as explained below] and causes less launch-tube erosion). One addition that a light-gas gun adds to the airgun is a rupture disk, which is a disk (usually metal) of carefully calibrated thickness designed to act as a valve. When the pressure builds up to the desired level behind the disk, the disk tears open, allowing the high-pressure, light gas to pass into the barrel. This ensures that the maximum amount of energy is available when the projectile begins moving.

The light-gas guns are typically divided into categories of single-stage and two-stage light gas gun.

One such single-stage light gas gun is located at Marquette University, Milwaukee, WI. It had been used for studying polymers and metals in pressure regions up to 20 GPa. The light gas gun at Marquette was manufactured by PAI and delivered in 2015. It has two barrels: a 15 foot, two inch smooth bore and a 13 foot, two inch slotted bore. The slotted bore allows for pressure-shear loading and complex target-flyer interactions. The maximum working pressure is 10,000 psi which allows for a 200 g projectile to be launched up to 1,200 m/s. The target tank is generally configured for planar and inclined impact experiments. Soft catch systems are often used to recover materials for post-shot analysis.

Diagram of a light-gas gun 1 — Breech block 2 — Chamber 3 — Propellant charge (gunpowder) 4 — Piston 5 — Pump tube 6 — Light gas (helium or hydrogen) 7 — Rupture disk 8 — High pressure coupling 9 — Projectile 10 — Gun barrel

One particular light-gas gun used by NASA uses a modified 40mm cannon for power. The cannon uses gunpowder to propel a plastic (usually HDPE) piston down the cannon barrel, which is filled with high-pressure hydrogen gas. At the end of the cannon barrel is a conical section, leading down to the 5-mm barrel that fires the projectile. In this conical section is a stainless steel disk, approximately 2 mm thick, with an "x" pattern scored into the surface in the middle. When the hydrogen develops sufficient pressure to burst the scored section of the disk, the hydrogen flows through the hole and accelerates the projectile to a velocity of 6 km/s (22,000 km/h) in a distance of about a meter.

NASA also operates light-gas guns with launch tube sizes ranging from 0.170 inches (4.3 mm) to 1.5 in (38 mm) at Ames Research Center. Hazardous testing is conducted at White Sands Test Facility.These guns have been used in support of various missions beginning with Apollo program reentry studies in the 1960s and most recently for high-speed thermal imaging. Velocities ranging from 1 km/s up to 8.5 km/s can be achieved. The largest of these involves a 6.25-inch (159 mm) diameter piston weighing more than 46 pounds (21 kg) to compress the hydrogen.

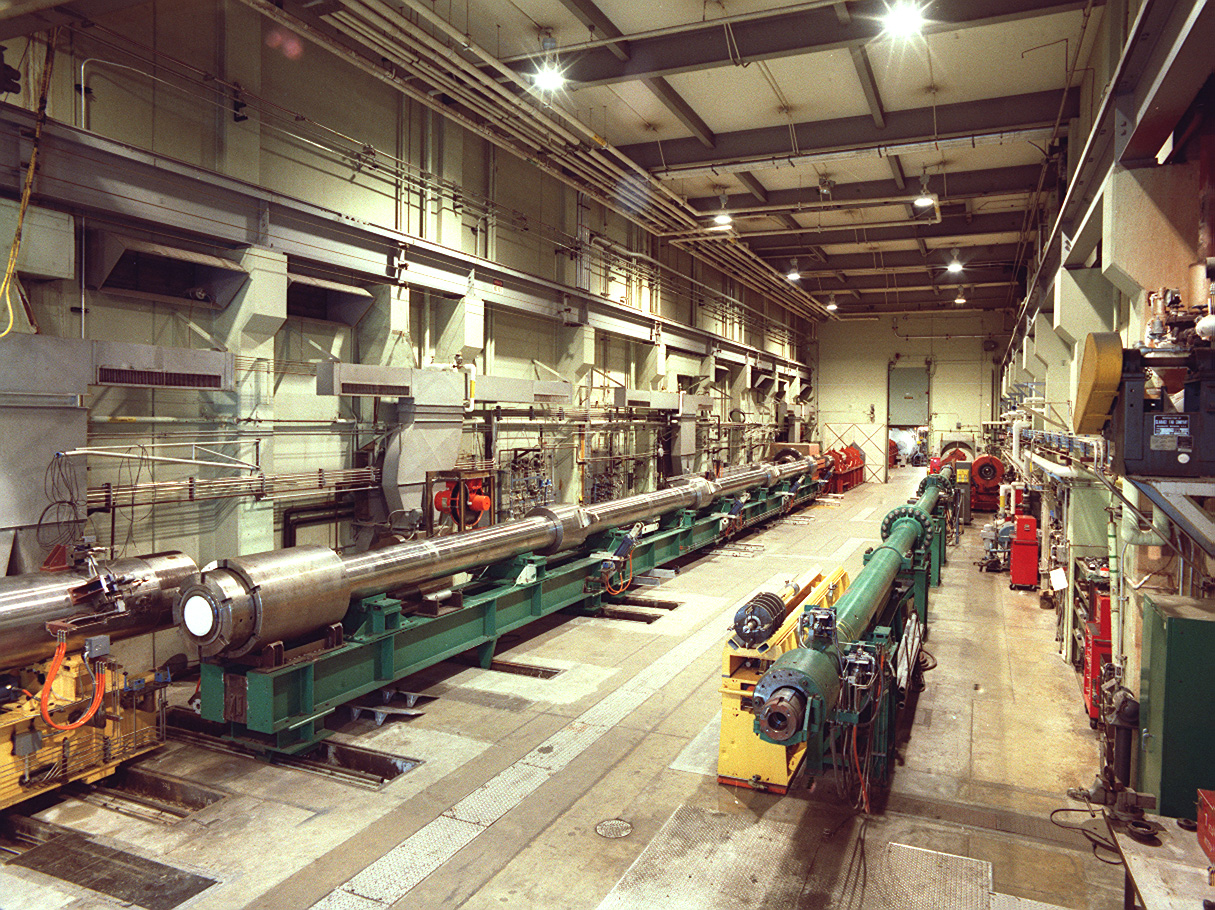
Two light-gas guns at Arnold Air Force Base's Hypervelocity Ballistics Ranges

Arnold Air Force Base's Range-G is the "largest routinely operated two-stage, light-gas gun system in the United States". Range-G utilizes interchangeable launch tubes ranging from a bore diameter of 3.3 inches (84 mm) to 8.0 inches (200 mm) with a 14.0-inch (360 mm) piston weighing up to 2,300 pounds (1,000 kg). Projectile velocities can reach 4.5 kilometres per second (16,000 km/h) for the 8.0-inch (200 mm) configuration and 7 kilometres per second (25,000 km/h) for the 3.3-inch (84 mm) launcher configuration. The primary use of the range facilities at Arnold Air Force Base is the measurement of released kinetic energy upon projectile impact.

=== Design physics ===
The muzzle velocity of an airgun, firearm, or light-gas gun is limited by, but not limited to, the speed of sound in the working fluid—the air, burning gunpowder, or a light gas. Up to the speed of sound, thermodynamics provides a simple, approximate calculation approach: the projectile is accelerated by the pressure difference between its ends, and since such a pressure wave cannot propagate any faster than the speed of sound in the medium, thermodynamic analysis suggests that the muzzle velocity is limited to the speed of sound. However, beyond the speed of sound, the kinetic theory of gases, which determines the speed of sound, provides a more detailed analysis in terms of the gas particles that comprise the working fluid. Kinetic theory indicates that the velocity of the gas particles is Maxwell-Boltzmann distributed, with the velocity of a large fraction of the particles exceeding the speed of sound in the gas. That fraction of the gas can continue to apply pressure to and therefore accelerate the projectile beyond the speed of sound in diminishing amounts as the projectile's speed increases.

The speed of sound in helium is about three times that in air, and in hydrogen 3.8 times that in air. The speed of sound also increases with the temperature of the fluid (but is independent of the pressure), so the heat formed by the compression of the working fluid serves to increase the maximum possible speed. Spring piston airguns increase the temperature of the air in the chamber by adiabatic heating; this raises the local speed of sound enough to overcome frictional and other efficiency losses and propel the projectile at more than the speed of sound in the ambient conditions.

=== Hybrid electrothermal light-gas gun ===
The hybrid electrothermal light-gas gun works on similar principles of the standard light-gas gun, but adds an electric arc to heat the light gas to a higher temperature and pressure than the piston alone. The arc is applied in the chamber containing the light gas, raising the temperature and pressure to the point where the gas both breaks the bursting disk and ignites the propellant behind the piston, which is perforated to allow ignition. The resulting combination of electrical heating and piston compression provide higher pressures and temperatures, resulting in more power and a higher potential speed than a standard light-gas gun.

=== Impact profile ===
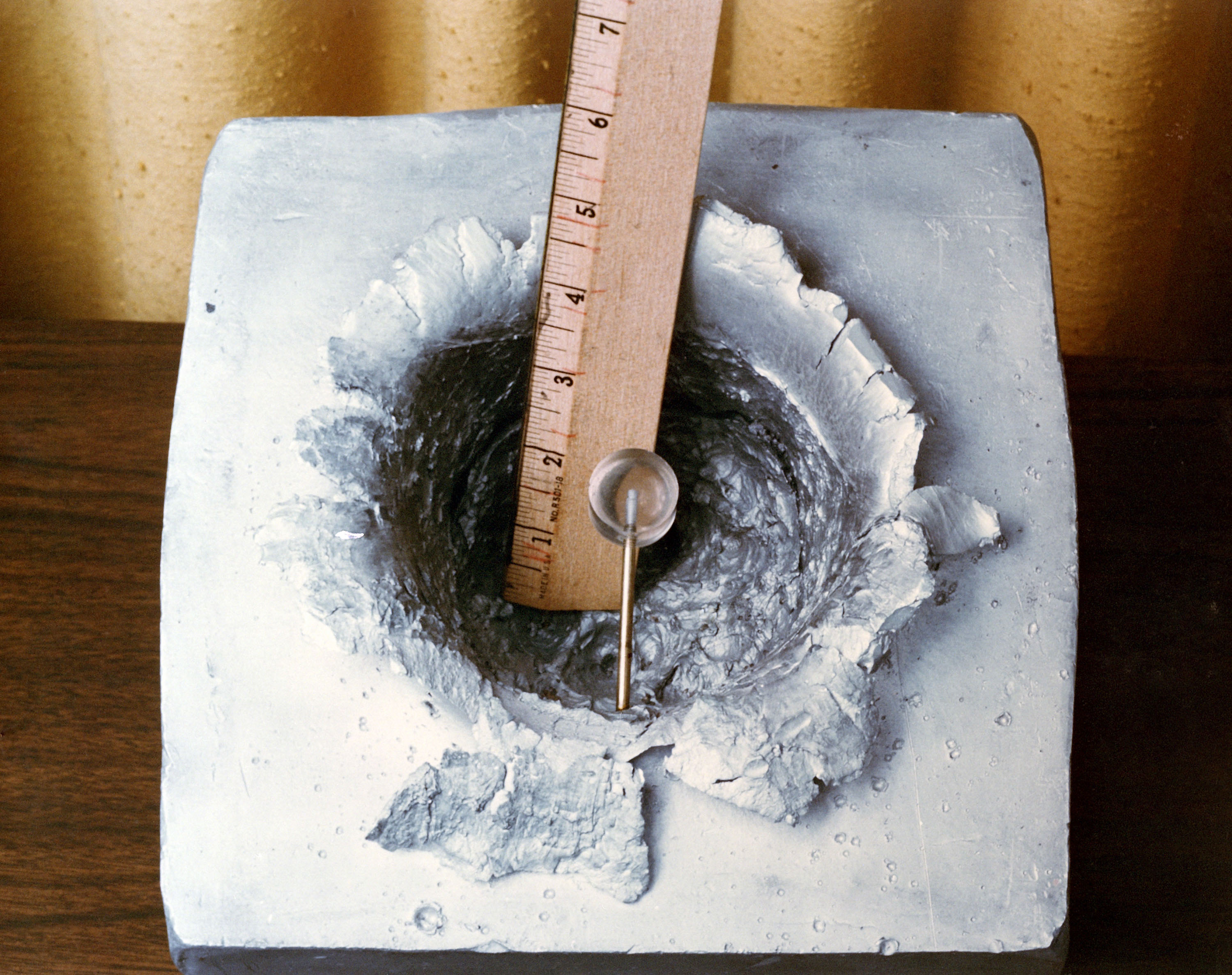
In this Kinetic Energy Weapon test, a seven-gram Lexan projectile was fired from a light-gas gun at a velocity of 23,000 feet per second (7,000 m/s; 16,000 mph) at a cast aluminum block.

When the projectile fired by a light-gas gun impacts its target, the pressure applied depends upon the mass of the projectile and the surface area, or cross-section, over which the impact force is distributed. Because air-launched projectiles experience friction with air molecules, drag increases proportionally to increased projectile surface area, which results in slower velocities the larger the surface area of a projectile is. As such, a dense and narrow projectile will apply more pressure overall than a light and wide one. Looking at constant cross-sectional projectiles, researchers have recently begun to vary their projectiles' density as a function of length. Since the projectiles travel at a known velocity, changes in density as a function of length have a predictable relationship to the impact pressure applied as a function of time. With materials in a wide range of densities (from tungsten powder to glass microspheres) applied in thin layers, carefully made projectiles can be used in constant-pressure experiments, or even controlled compression–expansion–compression sequences.

== See also ==
- Combustion light-gas gun – High-velocity gun that uses combusted gas as propellant
- Ram accelerator – High-velocity gun that uses different principles to achieve similar projectile velocities
- Shock tube – Tool used to demonstrate the properties of very high speed gases
- Space gun – Method of launching an object into outer space via a large gun or cannon
- Super High Altitude Research Project – U.S. government research project
- Voitenko compressor – Shaped charge driven device which uses hydrogen gas to accelerate thin disks up to about 40 km/s
