= Project HARP =

US-Canada ballistics research project famous for its extremely large gun

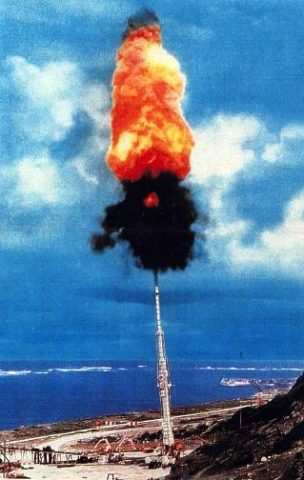
HARP 16-inch (410 mm) gun at its test site in Barbados (Coordinates: 13°4′38.3″N 59°28′32.48″W)

Project HARP, for high altitude research project, was a joint venture of the United States Department of Defense and Canada's Department of National Defence created with the goal of studying ballistics of re-entry vehicles and collecting upper atmospheric data for research. Unlike conventional space launching methods that rely on rockets, HARP instead used very large guns to fire projectiles into the atmosphere at extremely high speeds.

A 16-inch (41 cm) HARP gun operated by the U.S. Army's Ballistic Research Laboratory (now called the U.S. Army Research Laboratory) at Yuma Proving Ground currently holds the world record for the highest altitude that a gun-fired projectile has achieved: 180 kilometres (111.8 mi), well above the Kármán line conventionally marking the beginning of outer space.

== History ==
=== Preparations ===
Project HARP originated as the brainchild of Gerald Bull, a renowned but controversial ballistic engineer specializing in high-velocity guns and gun propulsion systems. In the mid-1950s, Bull was working on anti-ballistic missile (ABM) and intercontinental ballistic missile (ICBM) research at the Canadian Armaments and Research Development Establishment (CARDE) when he formulated the idea to launch satellites into orbit using an enormous cannon. Bull believed that a large supergun would be significantly more cost-effective at sending objects into space than a conventional rocket. Bull argued it would not need expensive rocket motors, firing a large gun wouldn't require the missile to throw away multiple rocket stages to break through the Earth's atmosphere to reach orbit. In theory, a sabot would protect the payload during firing and later fall away as the satellite inside emerges.

During the late 1950s, Bull conducted preliminary launch experiments at the CARDE (now known as Defence Research and Development Canada – Valcartier, or DRDC Valcartier) using guns as small as 76 mm in bore diameter. These experiments soon caught the attention of the U.S. Army's Ballistic Research Laboratory and the U.S. Army's Chief of Army Research and Development, Lieutenant general Arthur Trudeau. At the time, aircraft engineers needed more information on the atmosphere's upper regions to design better jet planes. However, launching rockets into the air to collect data was generally considered costly and inefficient. The U.S. military, in particular, was especially in need of a low-cost launch system that could cover altitudes that conventional aircraft and weather balloons couldn't reach to support the development of new supersonic aircraft and missile systems. By late 1960, CARDE and the Ballistic Research Laboratory (BRL) conducted several feasibility studies surrounding small gun-launched probes' structural integrity. Around the same time, BRL developed a smooth-bore, 5-inch (127 mm) gun system at Aberdeen Proving Ground that successfully launched a probe to altitudes exceeding 220,000 feet (67 km).

In 1961, Bull resigned from CARDE and McGill University hired him as a professor. Working together with Donald Mordell, the university's Dean of Engineering, Bull moved forward with his space gun project and requested funding from various sources. He received a $200,000 loan from McGill University's board of governors. He was given a verbal promise for a $500,000 grant from the Canadian Department of Defence Production (CDDP), which was later reportedly denied due to bureaucratic opposition. In October 1961, Bull met with Charles Murphy, the head of the Ballistic Research Laboratory, to pitch his project for a supergun and was met with overwhelming support. The U.S. Army provided Bull with substantial financial backing and two 16-inch (406,4 mm) naval gun barrels complete with a land mount and surplus powder charges, a heavy-duty crane, and a $750,000 radar tracking system. Bull and Mordell officially announced the HARP project as a program under McGill University's Space Research Institute at a press conference in March 1962. HARP was presented as a research initiative dedicated to "developing low-orbital capacity for geodetic and atmospheric objectives". However, the project's long-term goal was to place satellites into orbit economically.

=== Construction ===
In 1962, Bull and Mordell established a McGill University research station on Barbados (then still a British colony and part of the West Indies Federation) as HARP's main base of operations for its 16-inch (406,4 mm) super gun. The site location was first suggested by Mordell, who believed that a launch site closer to the equator would allow the projectile to procure extra velocity from the Earth's rotation to reach higher altitudes. In addition, the site's close proximity to the Atlantic Ocean made for the safe impact of re-entry projectiles. As a result of McGill University's close connections with the island's Democratic Labour Party, Bull met with the Barbados Prime Minister Errol Barrow to arrange the construction of a firing site at Foul Bay, St. Philip. HARP reportedly received enthusiastic support from the Barbados government due to expectations that the island nation would become heavily involved in space exploration research.

The installation of the 16-inch gun began at the newly established High Altitude Research Facility in April 1962. A gun pit was dug into the island's coral base, and a concrete emplacement was built on a plateau so that the gun barrel could stand vertically. The 16-inch naval gun barrels provided by the U.S. Army served as the barrels of the HARP gun. They had to be transported to the site on the U.S. Army landing ship, the Lieutenant Colonel John D. Page, with the U.S. Army Transportation Corps assistance, the U.S. Army Research Office, and the Office of the Chief of Research and Development. Hundreds of people from Barbados were employed to transport the two 140-ton gun tubes from the coast to the designated emplacement 2 1/2 miles from the beach using a temporary purpose-built railway. By late 1962, the HARP 16-inch gun was set up, and construction on workshops, storage buildings, radar installations, and other facilities neared completion. Around this time, the U.S. Army Research Office increased its financial support of the project to $250,000 per year. The first test shot from the 16-inch gun on Barbados was fired on January 20, 1963, marking the first time that a gun of this caliber was fired at a near-vertical angle. The 315 kg test slug reached an altitude of 3000 meters with a flight time of about 58 seconds at a launch velocity of 1,000 m/s before coming down a kilometer off-shore.

=== Operations ===
The projectiles fired by the 16-inch HARP gun on Barbados belonged to a family of cylindrical, finned missiles called Martlets, named after the martin bird that appeared on the McGill University crest. Inside the gun barrel, the Martlet was surrounded by a sabot. This machined wooden casing protected the projectile as it traveled through the barrel by absorbing the combustive energy and then splitting apart in the air after the Martlet exited the barrel. The Martlets also carried payloads of metallic chaff, chemical smoke, or meteorological balloons to gather atmospheric data as well as telemetry antennas for tracking the missile's flight. The Harry Diamond Laboratories designed several telemetry systems used in the HARP program. The firing of these Martlet missiles was always accompanied by a huge explosion that shook the houses within close proximity, leading to cracks in several areas. Since the Barbados government refused to recognize householders' damage claims, HARP fell into ill favor by much of the Barbados population.

From late January to early February 1963, the 16-inch gun on Barbados conducted its first test series using the Martlet 1, the first of which flew for 145 seconds and reached an altitude of 26 km. It was the first Martlet flight to feature a radio transmitter beacon that tracked the vehicle's flight. The second test series was conducted in April 1963 with the new Martlet 2 missiles, which set the world's new gun-launched altitude record of 92 km. Around the same time, development for the Martlet 3A began in the spring, with test launches commencing in September. By the end of 1963, approximately 20 Martlet 2 missiles were launched and regularly reached altitudes of 80 km. From these tests, researchers obtained a significant amount of atmospheric data as well as the internal ballistics of the 16-inch gun and the flight performance of the Martlet 2, 3A, and 3B. Impressed with the HARP program's initial results, the U.S. Army agreed to provide $250,000 per year in funding.

In 1964, the HARP gun on Barbados continued to primarily launch Martlet 2 missiles that carried a wide variety of payloads. Part of the reason was its low cost, since the firing of the Martlet 2 cost from $2500 to $3000 and took only half an hour to load. The new results from HARP convinced the U.S. Army to increase the annual funding of the project from $250,000 to $1.5 million per year. By March 1964, Canada's Department of Defence Production (DDP) agreed to provide joint funding for the HARP program for a total of $3 million per year. However, HARP funding reportedly faced several obstacles in the form of bureaucratic sabotage due to opposition in the Canadian government. The funding promised by the DDP for July 1, 1964, to June 30, 1965, did not arrive until May 1965. During this period, McGill University covered the funds to the best of its ability, although changes had to be made to the original plan. For each subsequent funding periods, the DDP repeatedly delayed HARP funding late into the fiscal year.

The first attempts to improve the performance of the 16-inch gun at Barbados were made in 1964, primarily by increasing the barrel's length. In 1962, the Ballistic Research Laboratory increased the barrel length of a 5-inch gun system by welding a second section of barrel to the first barrel's muzzle, lengthening the barrel to 8.9 meters. The resulting gun system demonstrated a higher muzzle velocity at the muzzle exit. The longer barrel allowed the propellant gases to push on the projectile for a longer period of time. In September 1964, a ten-calibers extension was added to the 16-inch gun based on BRL's experiment with the 5-inch gun. However, while increased velocity and altitude was recorded for test flights, the extension failed in December after the eleventh shot was fired. In 1965, a successful extension of the 16-inch gun was established after enlarging the gun pit to accommodate the equipment's large size. The extension almost doubled the length of the gun to 120 feet (36,6 m) and weighed nearly 200 tons, making the 16-inch Barbados gun the largest operational artillery piece in the world at the time.

By the end of 1965, Project HARP had fired more than one hundred missiles at heights over 80 km high into the ionosphere. At this point, the project started planning the launch of the Martlet 4, a projectile that used rocket jets that would ignite mid-flight to send the missile into orbit. For this endeavor, BRL designed the telemetry system that utilized Sun sensors to determine the projectile's altitude. This telemetry system would serve as an early precursor to the U.S. Army's Aeroballistic Dynamic Fuze (DFuze).

By 1966, the HARP program had established several different launch sites around the United States and Canada, including a second 16-inch HARP gun at the Highwater Range in Quebec and a third 16-inch HARP gun at Yuma Proving Ground, Arizona.

On November 18, 1966, the HARP gun operated by BRL at Yuma Proving Ground launched an 84-kg Martlet 2 missile at 2,100 m/s, sending it briefly into space and setting a world altitude record of 179 km. This feat has remained the world altitude record for any fired projectile.

=== Closure ===
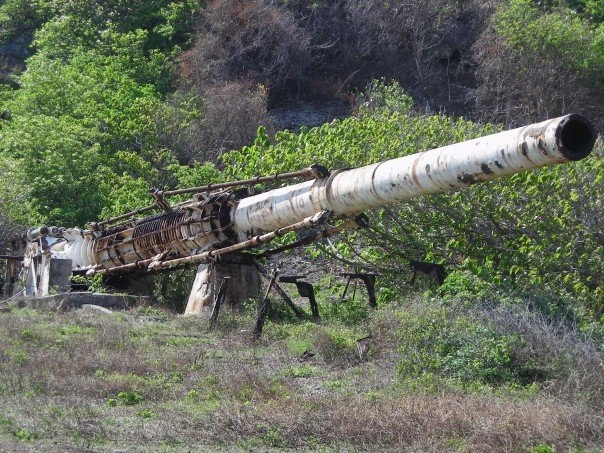
Abandoned HARP gun in Barbados

Throughout 1966, the HARP program experienced a series of funding delays caused by immense opposition from critics in the Canadian government and growing bureaucratic pressures. Upon the end of the Canadian government's participation in June 1967, the Canadian government had contributed $4.3 million and the US Army $3.7 million.

HARP Funding receipts by McGill University
Start date	End date	Funding amount received
June 1, 1964	May 30, 1965	$1,129,932
June 1, 1965	May 30, 1966	$2,138,432
June 1, 1966	May 30, 1967	$2,911,861
June 1, 1967	May 30, 1968	$155,700

On the American side, growing political and financial pressure caused by the Vietnam War and NASA's focus on large-scale traditional rockets strained funding for the project as well, exacerbating the program's problems even further. In November 1966, the Canadian government announced that it would pull all Project HARP funding after June 30, 1967. Despite Bull's attempts to resuscitate the program, the Canadian government withdrew its support in 1967. This decision promptly caused the U.S. Army to withdraw its funding as well, leading to the program's complete termination. Both the HARP guns at Barbados and at Highwater Range were shut down, though the HARP guns under the jurisdiction of the U.S. military remained operational. Project HARP's assets were transferred to Bull, who started a Space Research Corporation commercial operation to salvage his project. After HARP was cancelled, the 16-inch gun on Barbados remained on its emplacement, where it remains to this day, gradually rusting away.

== Testing ==
The guns used for Project HARP consisted of smooth-bore 5-inch (127 mm), 7-inch (177 mm), and 16-inch (406 mm) guns, all of which were designed to launch sub-caliber saboted projectiles into the upper atmosphere. In addition to the High Altitude Research Laboratory at Barbados, a 16-inch HARP gun was constructed at the Highwater Range in Quebec and at Yuma Proving Ground in Arizona. Smooth-bore 5-inch and 7-inch guns were set up at several different test sites, including Fort Greely, Alaska, Wallops Island, Virginia, Aberdeen Proving Ground, Maryland, and White Sands Missile Range, New Mexico. The data collected from the projectiles fired from these gun systems were measured by radar chaff, aluminized balloons, trimethylaluminum trails, and sensors ranging from sun sensors to magnetometers.

=== 5-inch gun systems ===
The 5-inch HARP guns were based on a modified 120 mm T123 service gun and used by the Ballistic Research Laboratory before the HARP program in order to fulfill the needs of the U.S. military's Meteorological Rocket Network, a program dedicated to collecting atmospheric wind and temperature data. They were designed to carry a 0.9 kg payload to an altitude of 65 km, which consisted of radar reflective chaff to collect wind data and small radiosondes that returned radio telemetry of information like temperature and humidity as they drifted back down under large parachutes. This initial design for the 5-inch HARP gun reached an altitude of 130,000 ft when tested in 1961. The 5-inch L70 smoothbore guns was the first vertical firing gun system developed under Project HARP. In 1962, a 10-ft extension was implemented for the 5-inch HARP gun by welding a second barrel section to the first, allowing it to launch projectiles at muzzle velocities of 1554 m/s (5,100 ft/sec) to altitudes of 73.100 km (240,000 ft). Throughout HARP, further modifications were made to the 5-inch gun, such as adding three sets of stiffening wires to maintain barrel alignment. Due to their small size, they were easily transported from their initial site at Aberdeen Proving Ground to different launch sites across North America and the Caribbean. One of the 5-inch HARP guns was acquired by the Atmospheric Sciences Laboratory (which consolidated into the U.S. Army Research Laboratory in 1992) to measure the stratosphere's winds. The 5-inch gun was deemed successful as a low-cost launch system, costing only around $300 to $500 per launch. By May 1966, a total of the HARP program's 5-inch guns launched 162 flights at Wallops Island, 47 flights at White Sands Missile Range, 30 flights at Barbados, and 24 flights at Fort Greeley.

=== 7-inch gun systems ===
The 7-inch HARP guns functioned as scaled-up versions of the 5-inch HARP guns that could carry three times the payload with an altitude capacity of 350,000 ft. The 7-inch gun system was constructed from a 175 mm M113 gun whose barrel was smooth-bored and extended by 26 ft (7.9 m). In general, its projectiles were 1.6 m long and weighed 27 kg. However, it was also capable of firing 5 kg slugs at a muzzle velocity of 2,880 m/s. The 7-inch HARP gun also incorporated the use of gun-boosted rockets to increase payload and altitude capacity. Unlike the 5-inch HARP guns, all vertical high-performance flights for the 7-inch HARP guns were conducted at NASA's Wallops Island facility, where 34 vehicles were launched by May 1966.

=== 16-inch gun systems ===
==== High Altitude Research Facility ====
The 16-inch HARP gun in Barbados held the largest gun record globally, with a barrel length of 119 ft (36 1/4 m) and weighing 200 tons. It consisted of two 16-inch U.S. Navy gun barrels welded together and smooth-bored to 16.4-inch diameter. It was capable of firing at a muzzle velocity of 2,164 m/s (7,100 ft/s) with a maximum acceleration at launch of 15,000 g. It launched a 181-kg shot with an 84-kg payload that could reach an altitude of 181 km (595,000 ft). For propellants, the 16-inch gun used either the solvent type WM/M.225 or the solventless M8M.225, both manufactured by Canadian Arsenals Limited. During testing, a camera station set up on the islands of Barbados, Saint Vincent, and Grenada were used to photograph the trimethylaluminium trails released from the projectile during launch, which provided data on upper atmosphere wind velocities for different altitudes.

==== Highwater Range ====
The 16-inch HARP gun at Highwater Range was established in 1964 near McGill University to conduct flight tests and other general research on the HARP guns without traveling all the way to the launch site at Barbados. Although the Highwater 16-inch gun was only capable of horizontal test flights and could not be elevated higher than 10 degrees, it was frequently used to test new and experimental launch vehicles and gun systems under each gun loads and in free flight. The Highwater 16-inch gun was primarily used for missile-sabot structural integrity tests, charge development, rocket grain tests, and for testing vehicle performance inside the gun and during the critical muzzle exit. In 1965, the barrel of the Highwater 16-inch gun was extended to a length of 176 ft (53.6 m), holding the record for the longest big-bore artillery piece in the world.

==== Yuma Proving Ground ====
The 16-inch HARP gun at Yuma Proving Ground was constructed in 1966 in order to establish a functional 16-inch gun on American soil and holds the record for achieving the highest projectile launched. It was almost identical to the 16-inch gun on Barbados, being 119 ft (36.3 m) long, but was limited by a 35-mile range restriction. However, unlike the Barbados gun, its projectiles could be recovered since they were not lost in the ocean upon their journey back down. The Yuma 16-inch gun was primarily used for flight tests, such as those testing altitude control and telemetry components. In 1966, the 16-inch Yuma gun underwent three firing series using wooden slugs, Martlet 2C's, and a Low Altitude High-Velocity cone.

Performance Test of Yuma 16-inch HARP gun in 1966
Date	Round number	Mass (lb)	Muzzle velocity (ft/s)	Apogee (thousands of feet)	Apogee (kilometers)
June 7	001 (W)	700	3360	No track	No track
June 8	002 (W)	800	3190	No track	No track
June 13	003 (W)	660	4810	No track	No track
June 13	004	760	5930	415	126.5
June 13	005	780	5810	398	121.3
June 14	006	780	6060	400	121.92
June 14	007	800	6270	Damaged	Damaged
June 15	008	760	5630	375	114.3
June 15	009	780	5850	410	125
Oct. 25	010	1095	5250	310	94.5
Oct. 26	011	1225	5950	410	125
Oct. 26	012	920	6800	540	164.6
Oct. 27	013 (L)	900	7100	No track	No track
Oct. 27	014	1275	5900	415	126.5
Oct. 27	015	920	6780	535	163
Oct. 27	016	950	7040	Damaged	Damaged
Nov. 16	017	1290	5900	396	120.7
Nov. 16	018	1292	5900	395	120.4
Nov. 16	019	1296	5850	415	126.5
Nov.17	020	1296	5950	415	126.5
Nov. 17	021	1290	NA	Damaged	Damaged
Nov. 18	022	1263	5900	400	122
Nov. 18	023	1263	5850	410	125
Nov. 18	024	922	6650	510	155.5
Nov. 18	025	880	6400	490	150.3
Nov. 19	026	910	6650	530	131
Nov. 19	027	1270	5850	400	122
Nov. 19	028	960	7000	590	180
Nov. 19	029	1270	NA	Damaged	Damaged
Nov. 19	030	960	6350	480	146.3
Nov. 19	031	1270	5650	367	112
Nov. 19	032	1270	5650	370	113
Nov. 19	033	880	6750	550	167.6

== Martlet projectiles ==
Several models of test projectiles were fired or designed during Project HARP: These projectiles were fired on the island of Barbados and some were fired by the US Army's Ballistic Research Lab. The tube's slender design, which contained the rocket's payload, was very narrow and long, limiting what objects could be inserted into the tube. This limitation on size was extremely inconvenient when considering the future proposed payloads of Martlet rockets, including satellites and space probes. The cannon-like design also eliminated the capacity for crewed space travel as well as the launching of satellites carrying extremely sensitive scientific instruments and payloads due to the extreme acceleration placed on the projectile during firing.

=== Martlet 1 ===
The Martlet 1 was the first test projectile of the HARP program. Designed in 1962, it was a 16-inch (406 mm) gun bore that weighed 450 lb (200 kg), was 6.6 inches (170 mm) in diameter and 70 inches (1,800 mm) long. Only four were manufactured, two of which were fired during the January and June 1963 test series.

=== Martlet 2A, 2B, 2C family ===
The Martlet 2A, 2B, and 2C represented the earliest of the Martlet 2 16-inch (406 mm) test projectiles. Martlet 2A was designed simultaneously with the Martlet 1 with a range of interest being 70 to 200 kilometers. Most carried multi-type research payloads studying the upper atmosphere and near-space conditions. Due to their low cost per missile launch, they were used to test out single payloads. Despite similarities in missile airframe, the Martlet 2A, 2B, and 2C featured differences in their structural materials and mechanical details. For the Martlet 2A, the liquid payload was loaded into an aluminum, tapered liner inside the missile body. But by the development of the Martlet 2C series, the aluminum insert was abandoned altogether to allow the liquid payload to be housed in contact with the steel body, increasing the quantity of the liquid payload that could be carried.

=== Martlet 2G and 2G-1 ===
The Martlet 2G was an advanced test projectile with nearly all of its total 350 lb (160 kg) weight in the projectile. It was tested successfully with the Highwater gun and the Barbados gun but never proceeded beyond the engineering flight testing stage. The Martlet 2G-1 was a proposed space launch vehicle variant of Martlet 2G, which had a solid rocket motor in the projectile. The follow-on 2G-2 proposal was to have had a second rocket motor to place the second stage in orbit, though with little or no payload. After development, it underwent horizontal development firings from the Highwater gun in 1966 but failed to be properly tested in time.

=== Martlet 3 ===
The Martlet 3 series consisted of advanced rocket-propelled projectiles. They were built and tested for the HARP project but were ultimately not successful due to restrictions in funding and a severe lack of technical information regarding large rocket grains' behaviour under high acceleration loading. When testing these projectiles, the danger of in-bore detonation was considered a severe potential problem.

==== Martlet 3A ====
The Martlet 3A was an 18-centimetre (7.1 in) diameter, gun-fired rocket projectile that theoretically could reach 500 km altitude. As HARP's first attempt at a low-cost sabotted rocket system, the projectile was built with fiberglass or aluminum bodies. A standard 6-inch rocket was bonded to an aluminum case. The rocket nozzle was supported by a pusher plate, which would impart the missile's acceleration through the aluminum wall casing. Fiberglass limited acceleration to 3600 g (corresponding to a velocity of 3,800 feet per second (1,200 m/s) at rocket ignition). The Martlet 3A's original objective was to carry a 40-lbs (18.2 kg) payload to an altitude of 500 km, which theoretically was feasible if the system could be launched at full gun pressures. The rocket motors' solid propellant deformed during firing and the design was never successful, despite several test firings.

==== Martlet 3B ====
The Martlet 3B was similar to the Martlet 3A but using steel casings and attempting to solve some of the 3A model's other problems. The casings survived 5,100 feet per second (1,600 m/s), but the propellant failed at 3,400 feet per second (1,000 m/s). This was solved for later rockets by filling the propellant cavity with liquid, but only after developing the 3B model had ended.

==== Martlet 3D ====
The Martlet 3D model was planned as a suborbital test rocket, using the first stage of the Martlet 4 solid rocket version. As the Martlet 4 was never built, no Martlet 3Ds were produced either.

==== Martlet 3E ====
The Martlet 3E was a solid suborbital rocket designed to be fired from a smaller, 7-inch (180 mm) cannon used in the HARP project. Its basic concept revolved around packaging the rocket grain in a case with elastic properties to transmit the lateral strain to the gun tube. The 3E model utilized a new rocket grain construction technique that consisted of laminating sheet double-base propellant grain under hydraulic pressure.

=== Martlet 4 ===
By July 1964, the Marlet 4 program pursued developing an orbit capable multi-stage rocket system to be launched from the 16" Barbados gun. Two versions of full-scale orbital launch vehicle projectiles were proposed in the Martlet 4 series. The first was to have used three solid rocket motor stages and was planned to orbit approximately 50 pounds (22.7 kg) of payload. The second used liquid rocket motors and was planned to have orbited 200 pounds (90.8 kg) of payload. Both were about 28 feet (8.5 m) long and 16 inches (410 mm) in diameter, weighing about 2,900 pounds (1,300 kg) at launch. However, no Martlet 4 vehicles were built; the project was halted before the design was completed.

==== Martlet 4 Control Systems ====
A guidance and control system was developed for the orbital mission by Aviation Electric Limited of Montreal under the direction of McGill-BRL-Harry Diamond Laboratory group. Infrared horizon sensors and sun sensors were included in calculating vehicle attitude. Information for on-board sensors was to be processed by the logic module, which provided commands to a cold gas thruster system which in turn adjusted the vehicle's orientation. The components of the guidance and control assembly were integrated into a 6.25-inch (159 mm) diameter test projectile. Sun sensors, horizon sensors, telemetry packs, receiving/transmitting antenna, hydraulic systems, logic modules, and gas thruster attitude control systems were all test-fired to approximately 10,000 g's.

== See also ==
- Super High Altitude Research Project
- Project Babylon (Dr. Gerald Bull's supergun project in Iraq)
- 16"/50 caliber Mark 7 gun
- V-3 cannon Vengeance Weapon 3
