= The High Frontier: Human Colonies in Space =

1976 book by Gerard K. O'Neill

- First edition cover
- Author: Gerard K. O'Neill
- Cover artist: Rick Guidice
- Subject: Space colonization
- Publisher: William Morrow and Company
- Publication date: 1976
- Publication place: United States
- Media type: Print (Hardcover)
- Pages: 288 pp (first edition)
- ISBN: 0-688-03133-1
- OCLC: 2388134
- Dewey Decimal: 609/.99
- LC Class: TL795.7 .O53 1977

The High Frontier: Human Colonies in Space is a 1976 book by Gerard K. O'Neill, a road map for what the United States might do in outer space after the Apollo program, the drive to place a human on the Moon and beyond. It envisions large human occupied habitats in the Earth-Moon system, especially near stable Lagrangian points. Three designs are proposed: Island one (a modified Bernal sphere), Island two (another sphere), and Island 3 (two O'Neill cylinders). These would be constructed using raw materials from the lunar surface launched into space using a mass driver and from near-Earth asteroids. The habitats were to spin for simulated gravity and be illuminated and powered by the Sun. Solar power satellites were proposed as a possible industry to support the habitats.

== Awards ==
The book won the 1977 Phi Beta Kappa Award in Science.

== Illustrations ==
The book featured impressions of life in outer space by a number of artists including Don Davis, Rick Guidice, and Chesley Bonestell.

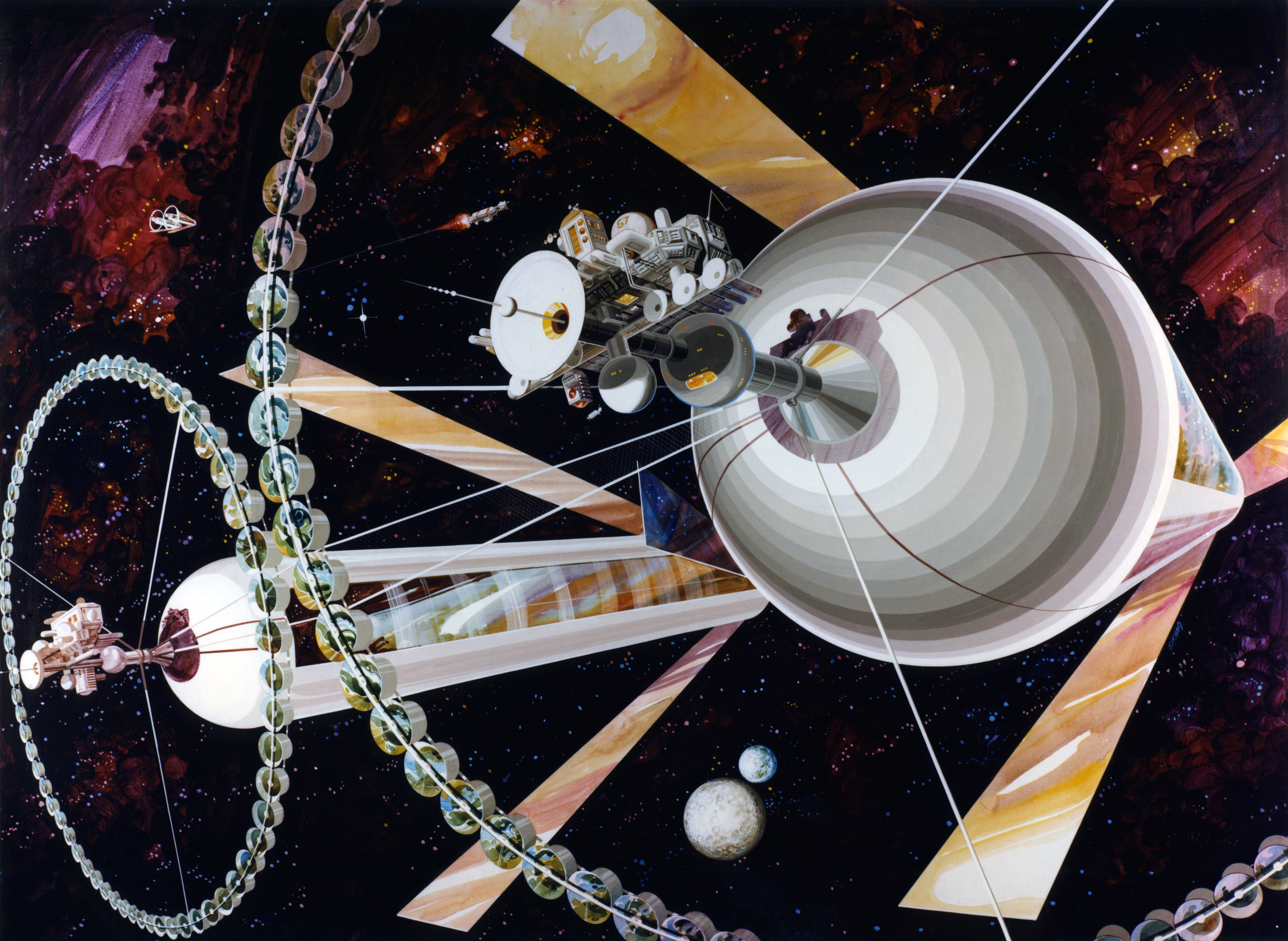
O'Neill cylinders

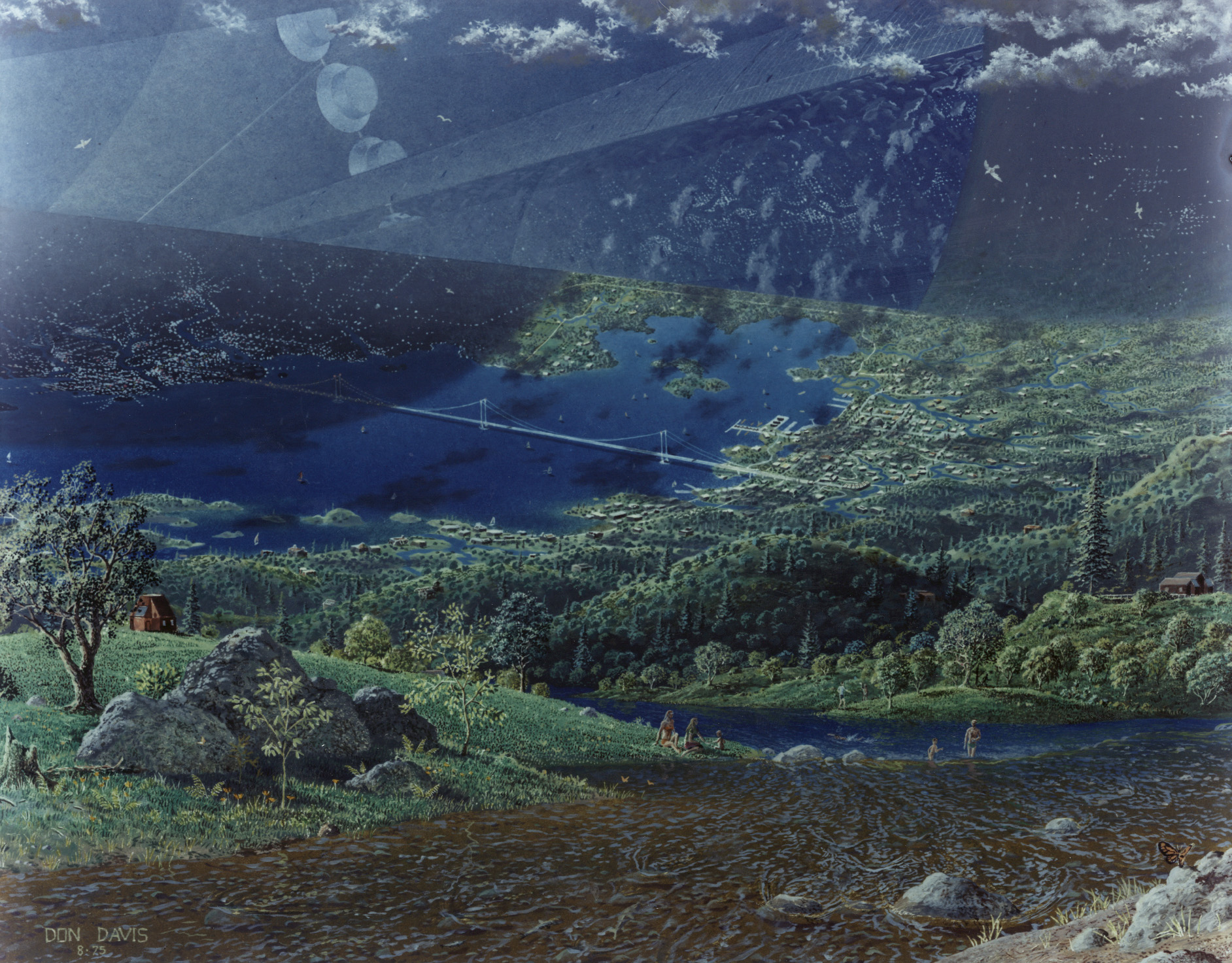
Interior of an O'Neill cylinder

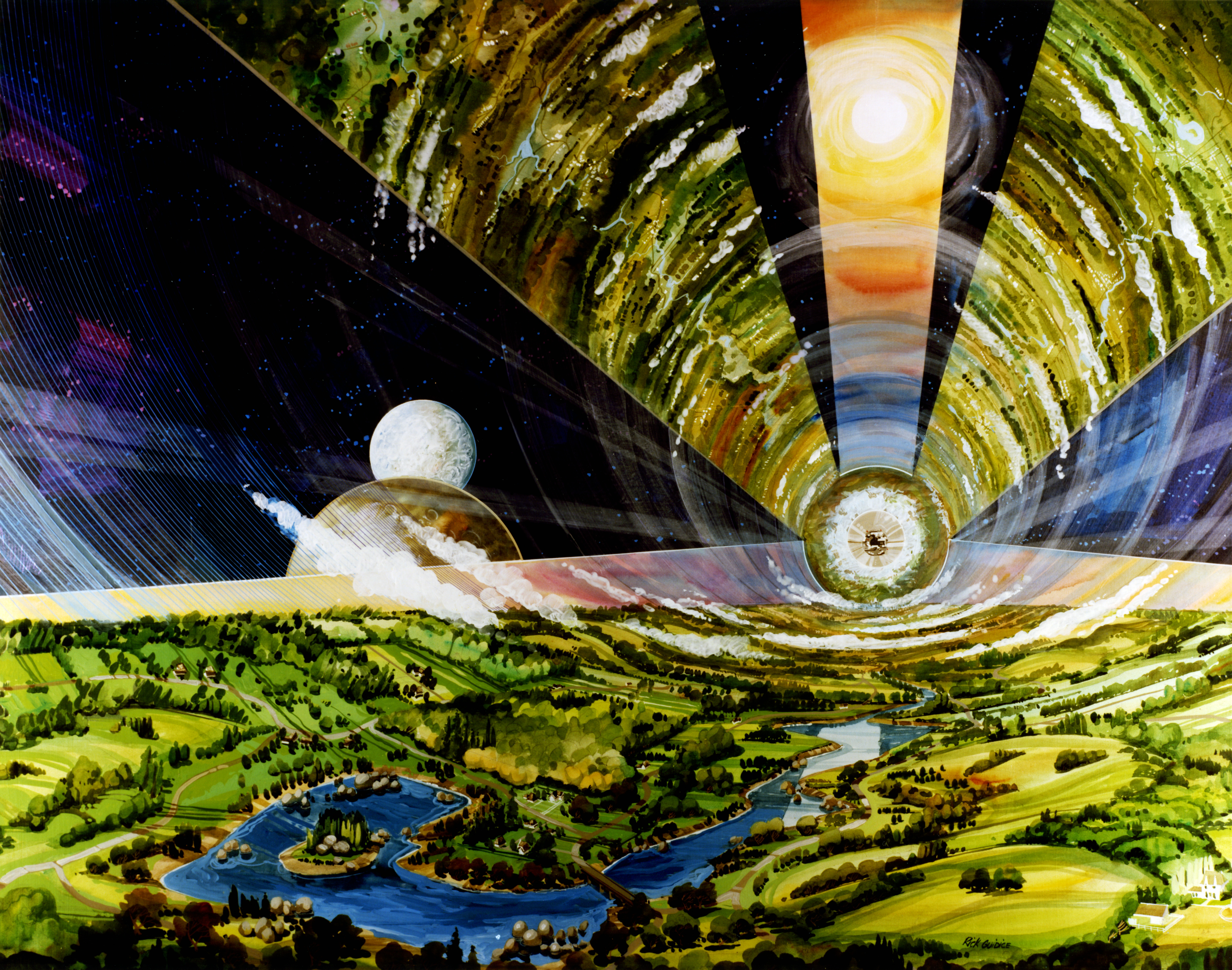
Interior of an O'Neill cylinder

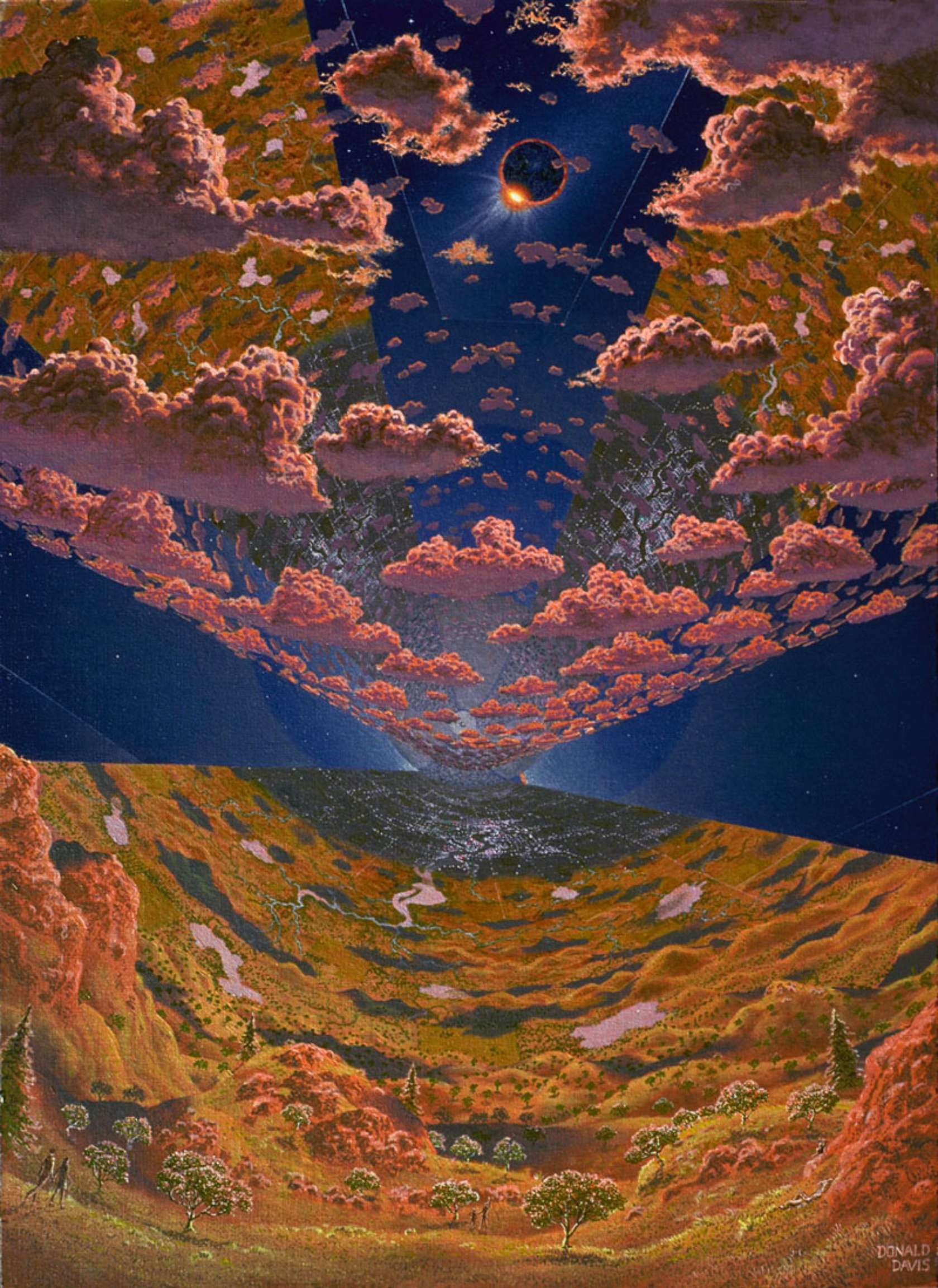
Solar eclipse inside an O'Neill cylinder

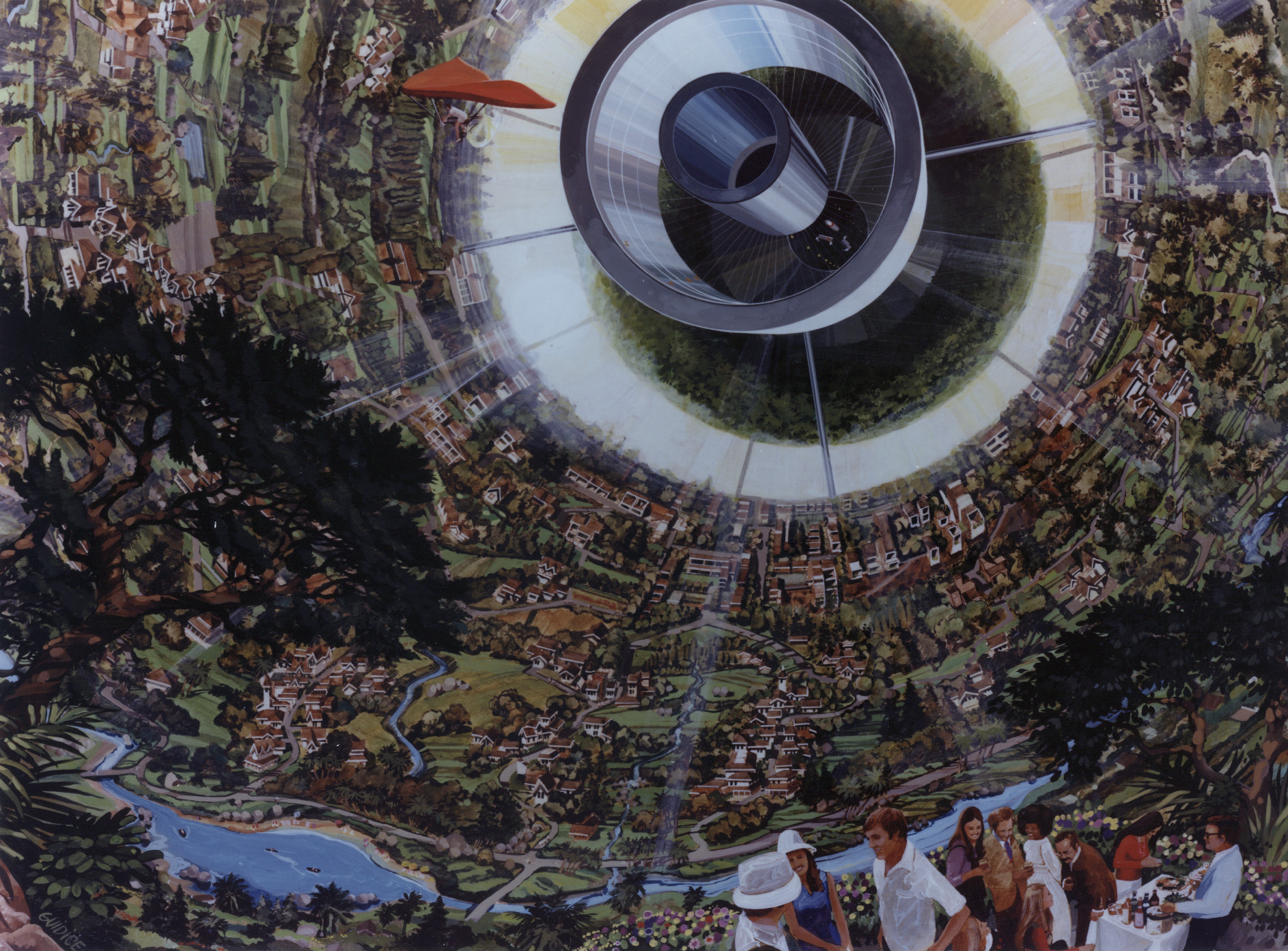
Interior of a Bernal sphere

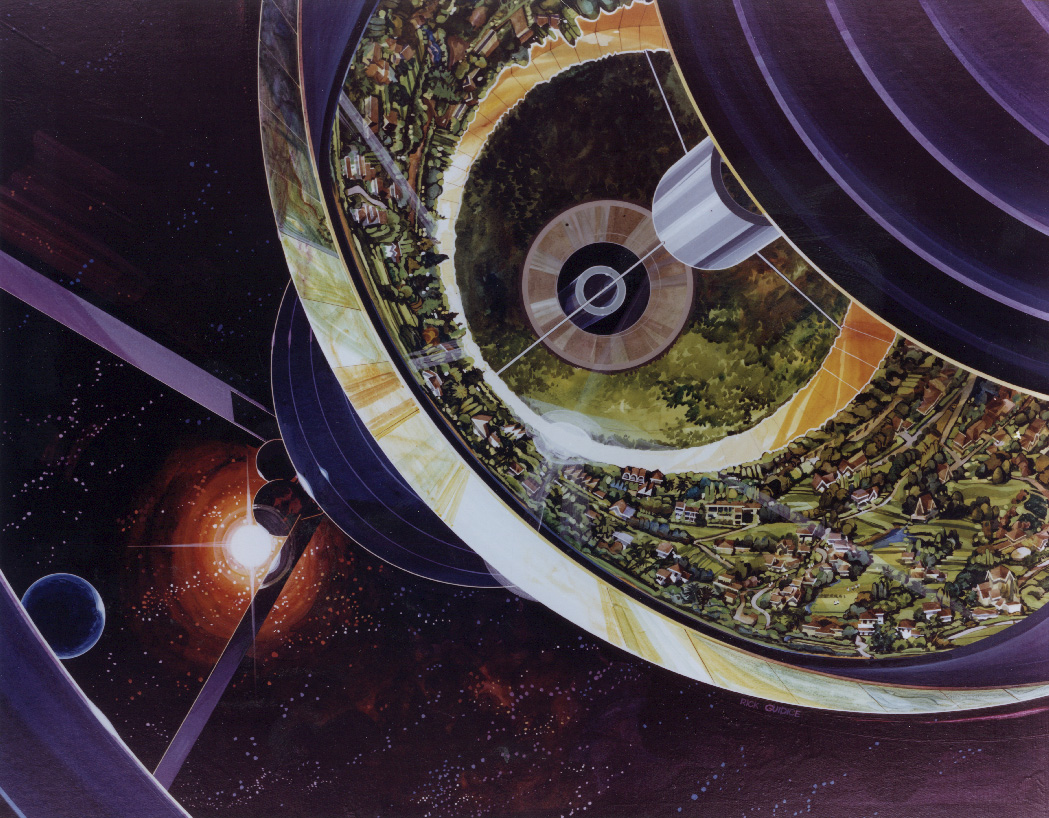
Cutaway of a Bernal sphere

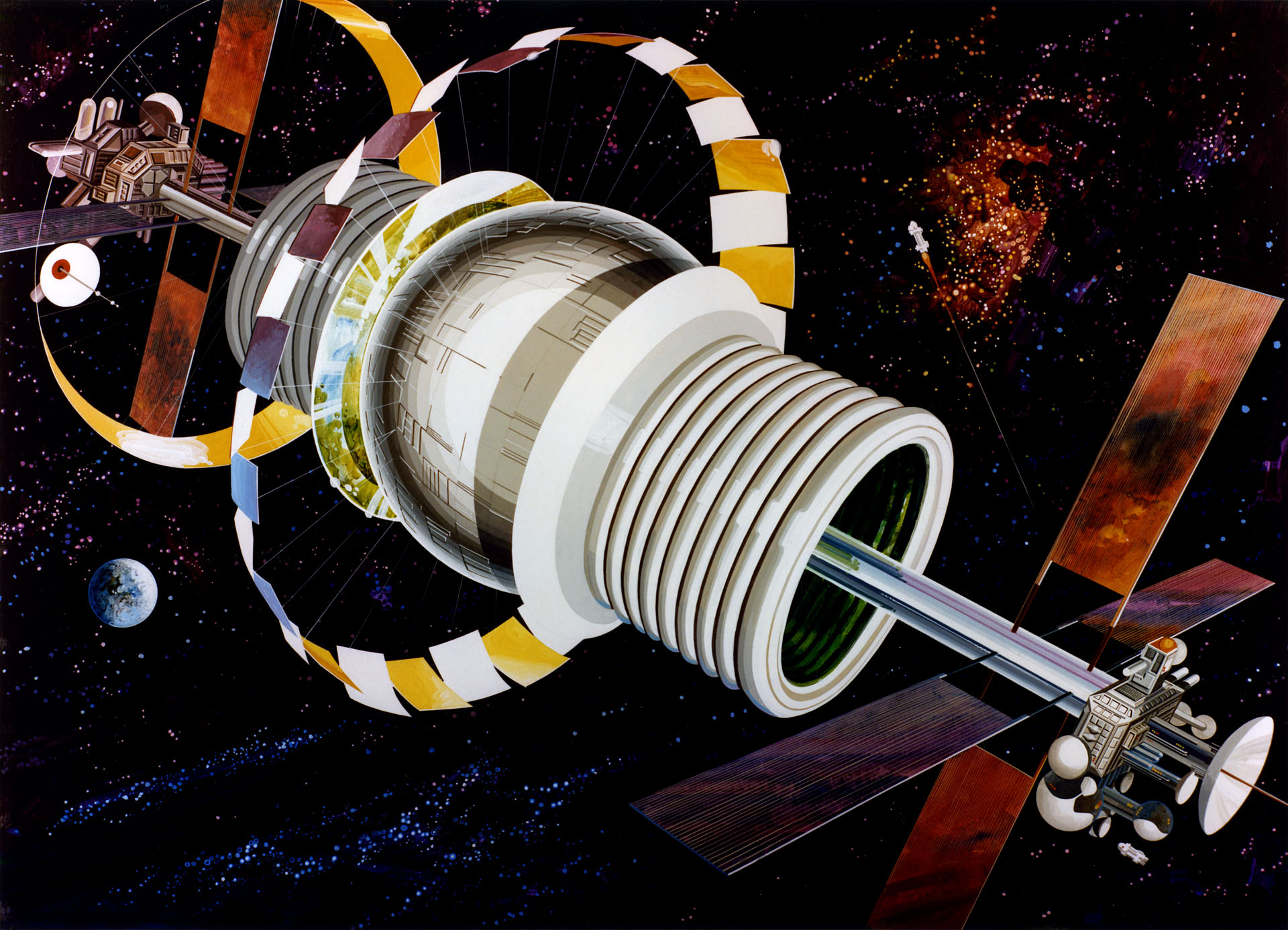
Exterior of a Bernal sphere

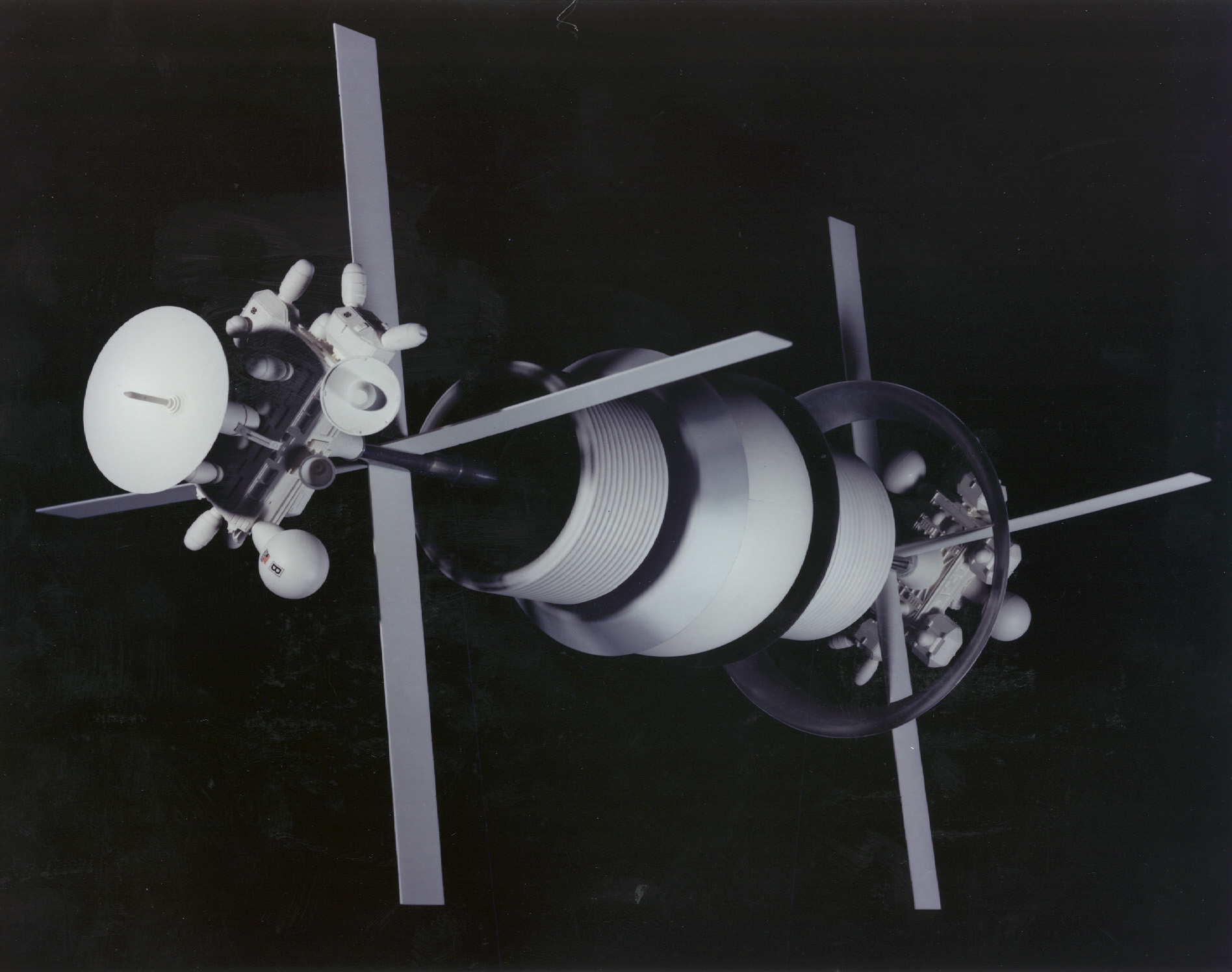
Exterior of a Bernal sphere

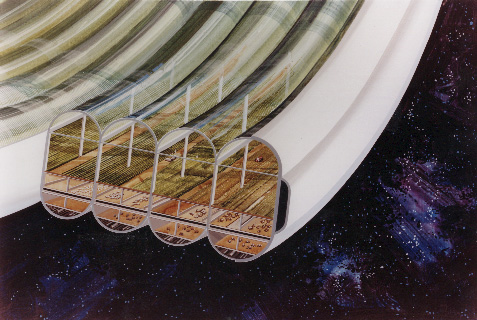
Agricultural module of a Bernal sphere

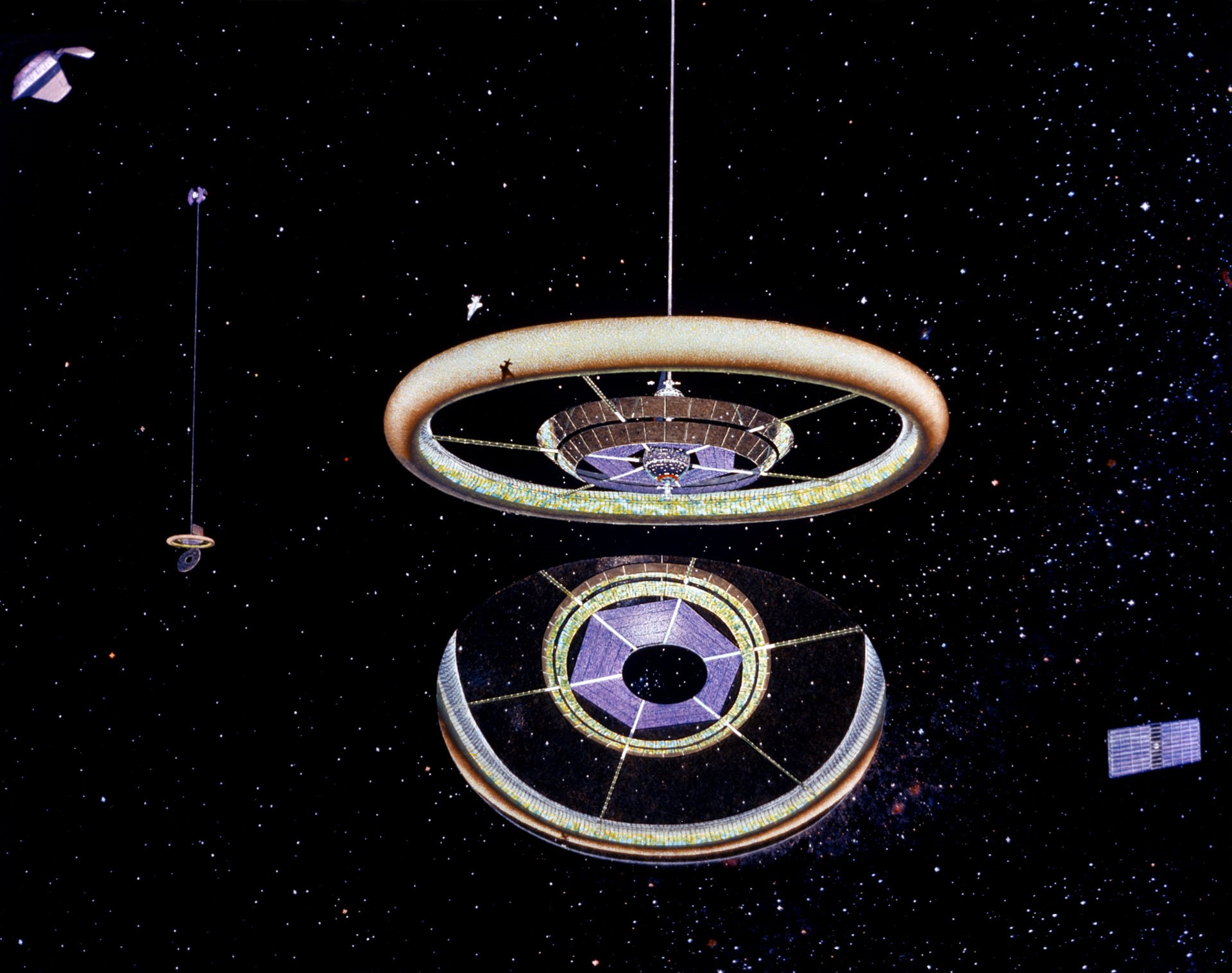
The Stanford torus and its mirror

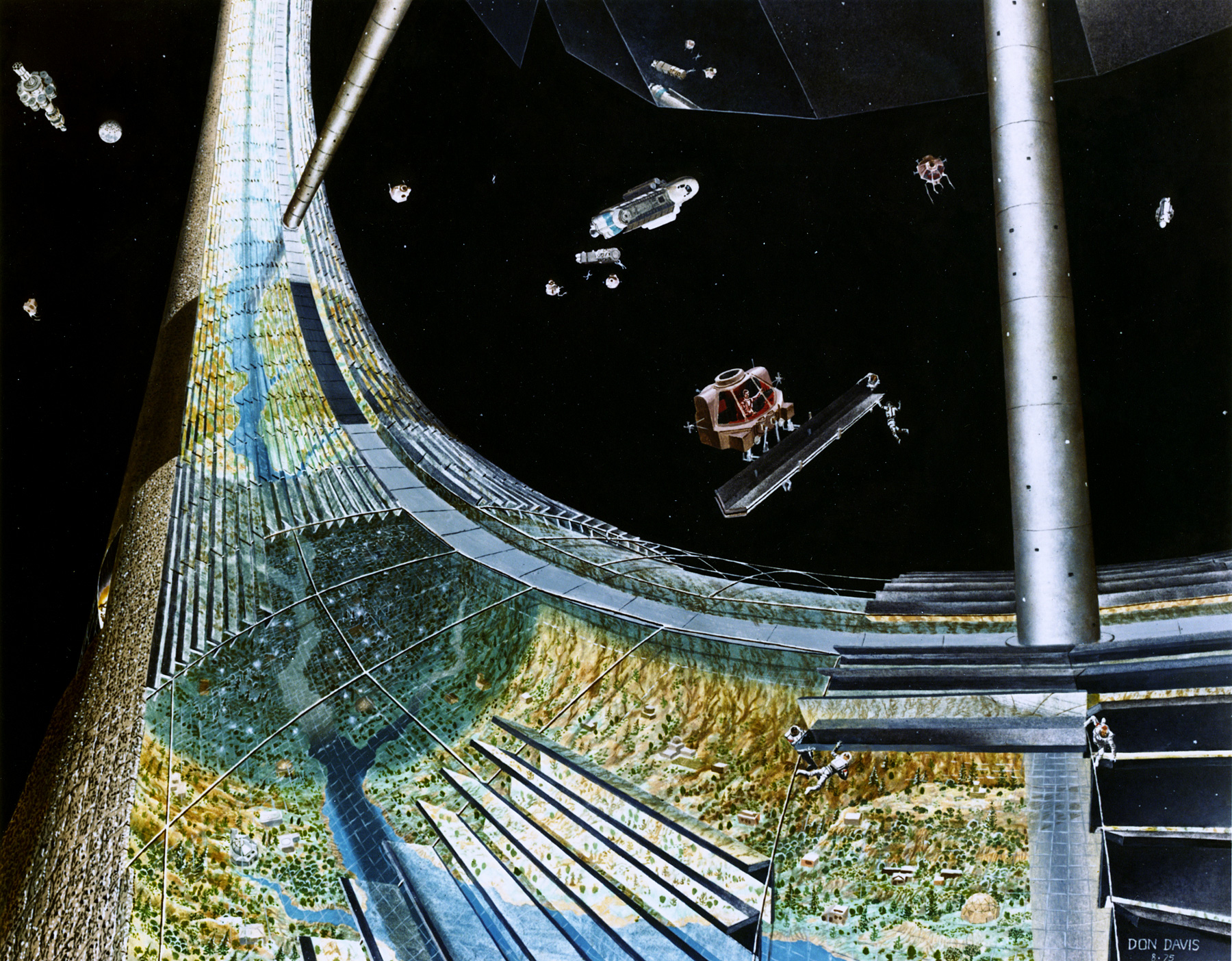
Stanford torus under construction

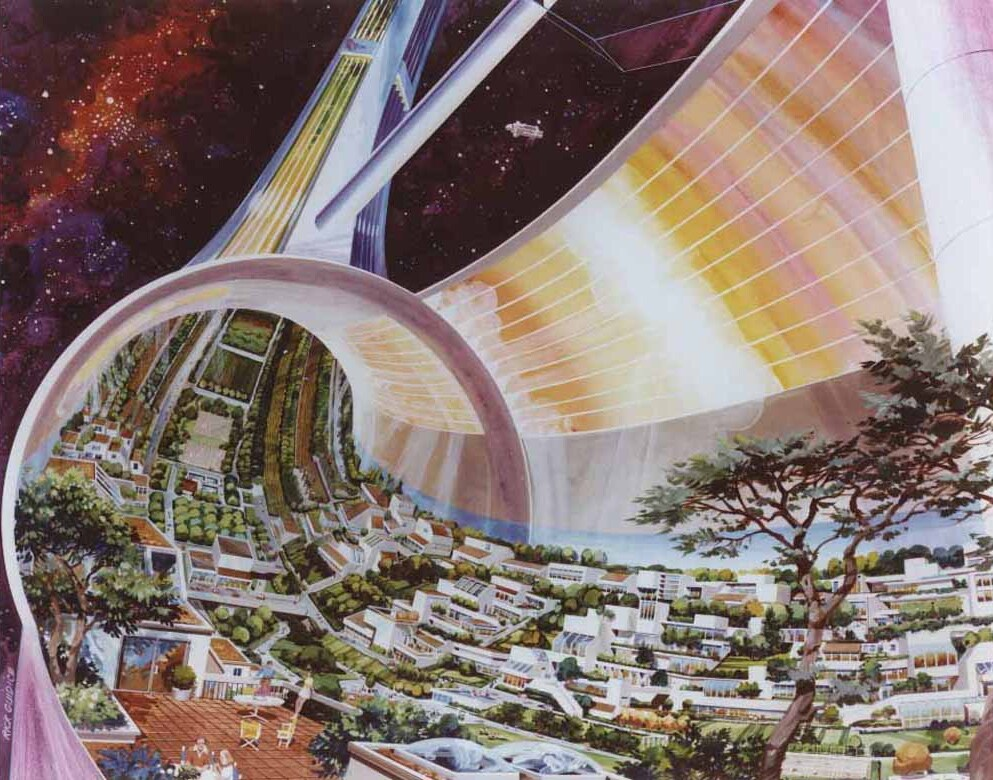
Stanford torus cutaway view

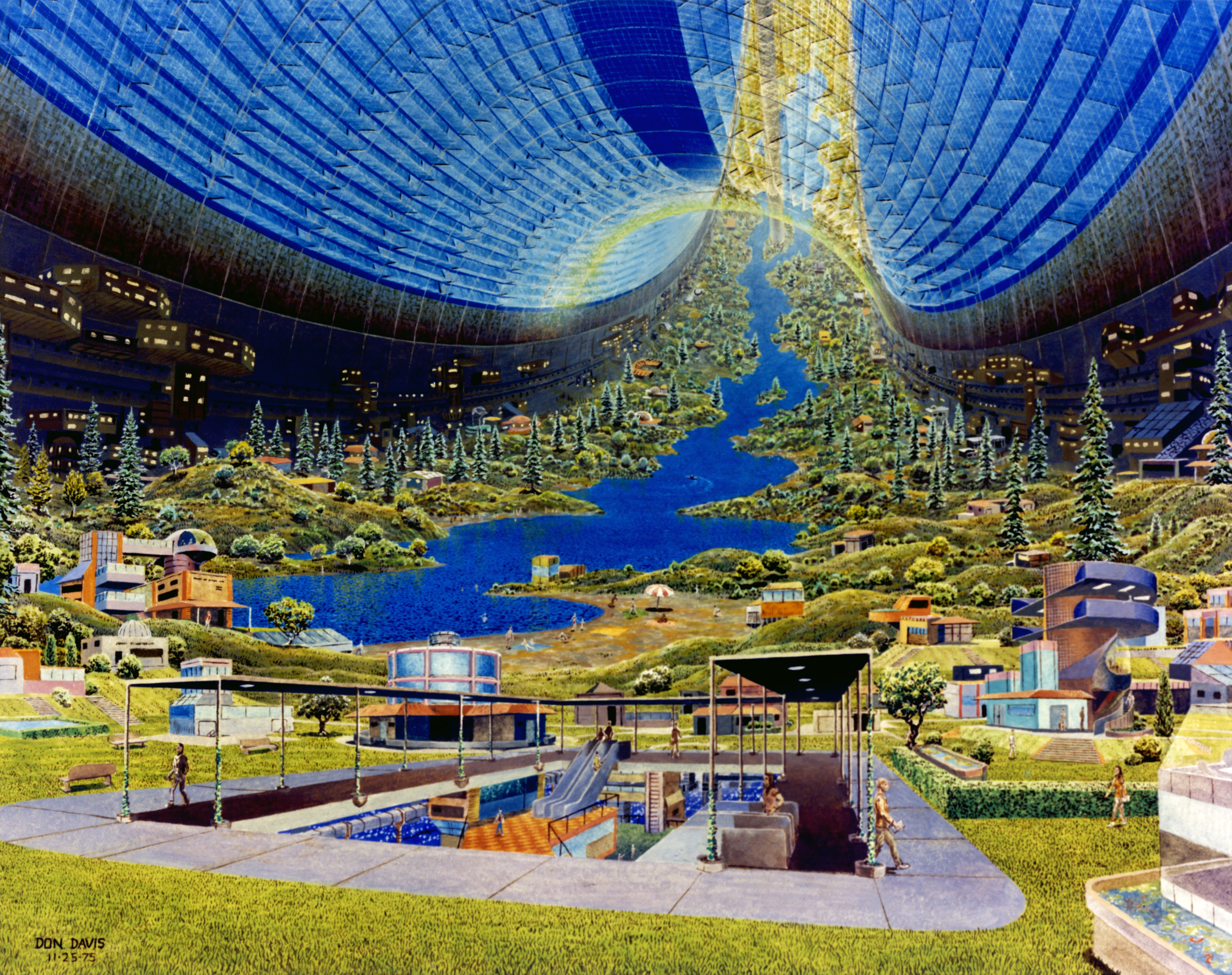
Interior of a Stanford torus

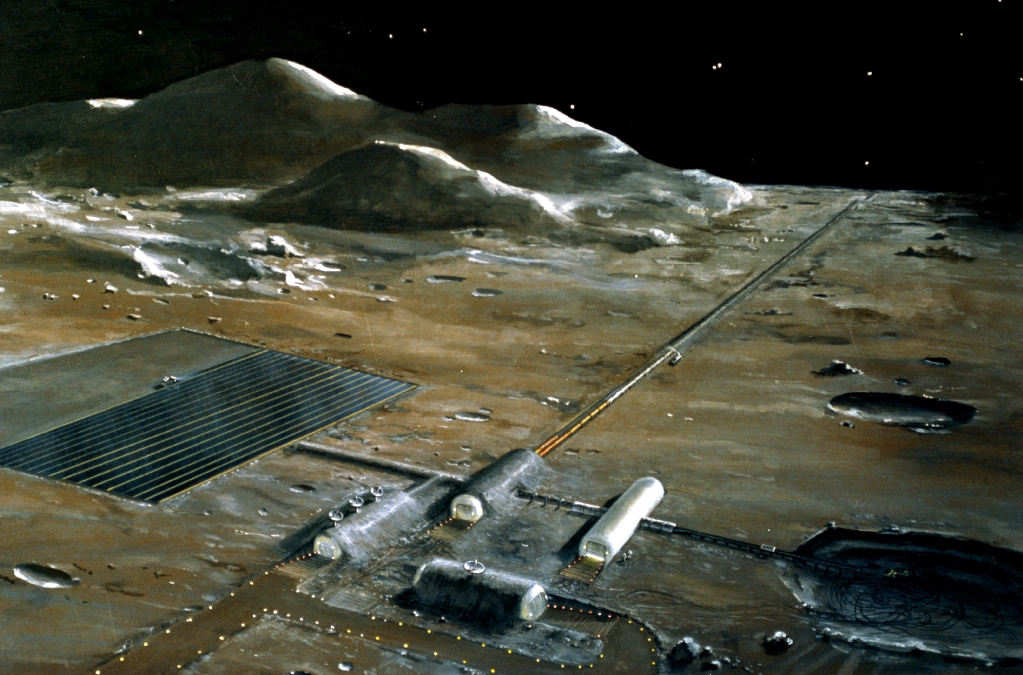
Lunar mass driver powered by solar panels.

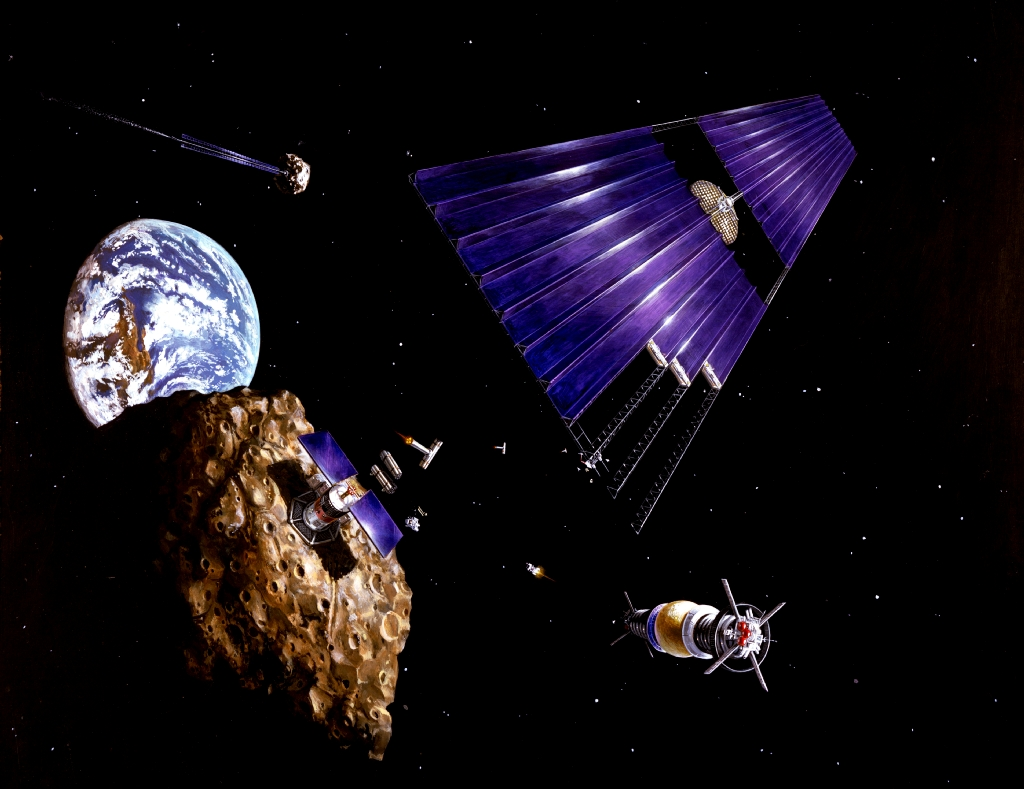
Solar power satellite built from an asteroid with a Bernal sphere in the bottom right corner.

== In popular culture ==
Many of the concepts illustrated in The High Frontier can be seen in the early series of the anime franchise Mobile Suit Gundam, which depicts a world where humans have migrated into space colonies. The O'Neill cylinder colony design appears frequently, largely unchanged from its original concept. The main space station in the popular TV series, Babylon 5, is similar to an O'Neill cylinder, but with internal lighting replacing the windows and mirrors.

== Criticism ==
Science fiction writer Charles Stross wrote a critical essay with a similar title on the feasibility of interstellar space travel and making practical use of various moons and planets in the Solar System: The High Frontier: Redux. Stross's criticisms do not directly apply to the O'Neill's "High Frontier" document about colonizing interplanetary space.

== See also ==
- 2081: A Hopeful View of the Human Future
- L5 Society
- Space stations and habitats in popular culture
