= 2081 (disambiguation) =

2081 is a year in the 2080s decade

2081 may also refer to

- The year 2081 BC in the 21st century BC
- 2081 (film), 2009 science fiction short film
- 2081 Sázava, a main-belt asteroid
- 2081: A Hopeful View of the Human Future, 1981 book by Gerard K. O'Neil
