= Space sphere =

The term space sphere refers to a space habitat shaped like a sphere. Types include:

- Bernal sphere
- Dyson sphere

== See also ==
- Space cylinder
