= Space cylinder =

The term space cylinder refers to a space habitat shaped like a cylinder. Types include:

- McKendree cylinder, hypothetical rotating space habitat originally proposed in 2000
- O'Neill cylinder, space settlement concept proposed in his 1976

== See also ==
- Space sphere
