= Helical railgun =

Multi-turn railgun that reduces current by a factor equal to the number of turns

Helical railguns are multi-turn railguns that reduce rail and brush current by a factor equal to the number of turns. Two rails are surrounded by a helical barrel and the projectile or re-usable carrier is cylindrical. The projectile is energized continuously by two brushes sliding along the rails, and two or more additional brushes on the projectile serve to energize and commute several windings of the helical barrel direction in front of and/or behind the projectile. The helical railgun is a cross between a railgun and a coilgun. They do not currently exist in a practical, usable form.

A helical railgun was built at MIT in 1980 and was powered by several banks of, for the time, large capacitors (approximately 4 farads). It was about 3 meters long, consisting of 2 meters of accelerating coil and 1 meter of decelerating coil. It was able to launch a glider or projectile about 500 meters.

In 2007, a solid-projectile helical-coil electromagnetic launcher was successfully built and tested at the University of Missouri-Columbia (MU). The design used a straight power rail, and a helical stator coil in the barrel and an armature coil inside the projectile. One brush mounted on the projectile conducted the current from the straight power rail into the projectile, and two more brushes on the projectile conducted the current into a segment of the helical coil near the front of the projectile. This segment of the coil creates a magnetic field which attracts the armature coil, which in turn pulls the projectile forwards. This movement moves the brushes mounted on the projectile forwards which prevents the armature coil from ever reaching the segment of helical coil pulling it. The device was powered by a capacitive-circuit which stored up to 125 kJ in energy, and achieved a 35.1 m/s muzzle velocity with a 145 g projectile.

Previously MU had demonstrated a helical coil electromagnetic launcher capable of accelerating ~500 gram hollow projectiles to 150 m/s. The launcher achieved an efficiency as high as 32%, the highest reported in the literature as of 2007.

== See also ==
- Railgun
- Plasma railgun
- Coilgun
- Mass driver
- Ram accelerator
- Light-gas gun
- Electrothermal-chemical technology
- Henry Kolm
