= Mass driver =

Proposed spacelaunch method

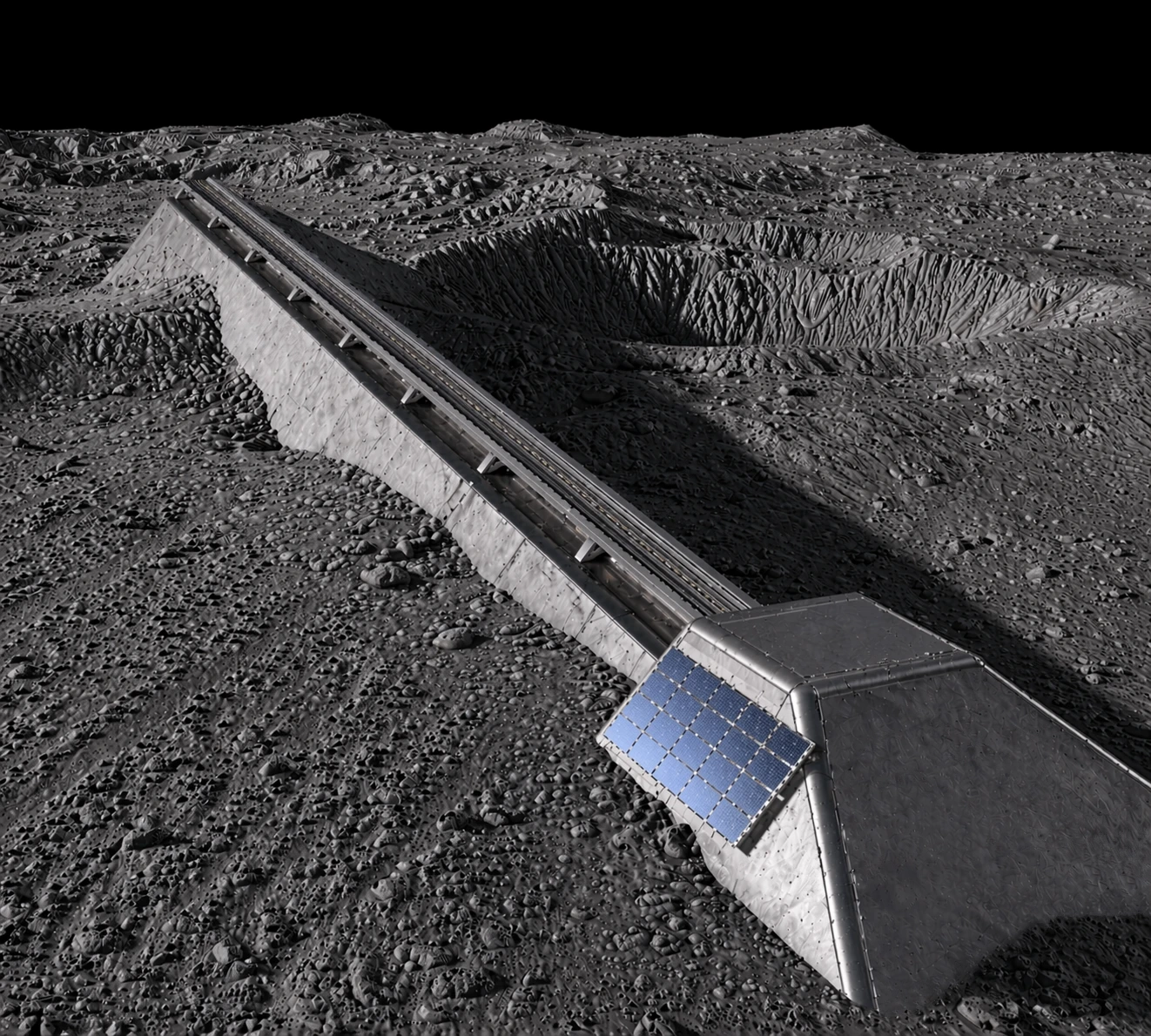
Lunar mass driver 3D concept

A mass driver or electromagnetic catapult is a proposed method of non-rocket spacelaunch which would use a linear motor to accelerate and catapult payloads up to high speeds. Existing and proposed mass drivers use coils of wire energized by electricity to make electromagnets, though a rotary mass driver has also been proposed. Sequential firing of a row of electromagnets accelerates the payload along a path.

Although any device used to propel a ballistic payload is technically a mass driver, in this context a mass driver is essentially a coilgun that magnetically accelerates a package consisting of a magnetizable holder containing a payload. Once the payload has been accelerated, the two separate, and the holder is slowed and recycled for another payload. Alternatively, a mass driver may be based on linear induction motors used as the Electromagnetic Aircraft Launch System (EMALS) on the aircraft carrier USS Gerald R. Ford.

Mass drivers can be used to propel spacecraft in three different ways: A large, ground-based mass driver could launch spacecraft away from Earth, the Moon, or another body. A small mass driver could act as a rocket engine on board a spacecraft, flinging pieces of material into space to propel itself. Another variation would have a massive facility on a moon or asteroid send projectiles to assist a distant craft.

Miniaturized mass drivers can also be used as weapons in a similar manner as classic firearms or cannon using chemical combustion. Hybrids between coilguns and railguns such as helical railguns are also possible.

== Fixed mass drivers ==
Mass drivers need no physical contact between moving parts because they guide their projectiles by dynamic magnetic levitation, allowing extreme reusability in the case of solid-state power switching, and a functional life of – theoretically – up to millions of launches. While marginal costs tend to be accordingly low, initial development and construction costs are highly dependent on performance, especially the intended mass, acceleration, and velocity of projectiles. For instance, while Gerard O'Neill built his first mass driver in 1976–1977 with a $2000 budget, a short test model firing a projectile at 40 m/s and 33 g, his next model had an order-of-magnitude greater acceleration after a comparable increase in funding, and, a few years later, researchers at the University of Texas estimated that a mass driver firing a 10 kilogram projectile at 6000 m/s would cost $47 million.

For a given amount of energy involved, heavier objects go proportionally slower. Lightweight objects may be projected at 20 km/s or more. The limits are generally the expense of energy storage able to be discharged quickly enough and the cost of power switching, which may be by semiconductors or by gas-phase switches (which still often have a niche in extreme pulse power applications). However, energy can be stored inductively in superconducting coils. A 1 km long mass driver made of superconducting coils can accelerate a 20 kg vehicle to 10.5 km/s at a conversion efficiency of 80%, and average acceleration of 5,600 g.

Earth-based mass drivers for propelling vehicles to orbit, such as the StarTram concept, would require considerable capital investment. The Earth's relatively strong gravity and relatively thick atmosphere make the implementation of a practical solution difficult. Also, most if not all plausible launch sites would propel spacecraft through heavily-traversed air routes. Due to the massive turbulence such launches would cause, significant air traffic control measures would be needed to ensure the safety of other aircraft operating in the area.

Most serious mass-driver designs use superconducting coils to achieve reasonable energetic efficiency (often 50% to 90+%, depending on design). Equipment may include a superconducting bucket or aluminum coil as the payload. The coils of a mass driver can induce eddy currents in a payload's aluminum coil, and then act on the resulting magnetic field. There are two sections of a mass driver. The maximum acceleration part spaces the coils at constant distances, and synchronizes the coil currents to the bucket. In this section, the acceleration increases as the velocity increases, up to the maximum that the bucket can take. After that, the constant acceleration region begins. This region spaces the coils at increasing distances to give a fixed amount of velocity increase per unit of time.

Based on this mode, a major proposal for the use of mass drivers involved transporting lunar-surface material to space habitats for processing using solar energy. The Space Studies Institute showed that this application was reasonably practical.

In some designs, the payload would be held in a bucket and then released, so that the bucket can be decelerated and reused. A disposable bucket, on the other hand, would avail acceleration along the whole track. Alternatively, if a track were constructed along the entire circumference of the Moon (or any other celestial body without a significant atmosphere) then a reusable bucket's acceleration would not be limited by the length of the track – however, such a system would need to be engineered to withstand substantial centrifugal forces if it were intended to accelerate passengers and/or cargo to very high velocities.

=== On Earth ===
In contrast to cargo-only chemical space-gun concepts, a mass driver could be any length, affordable, and with relatively smooth acceleration throughout, optionally even lengthy enough to reach target velocity without excessive g forces for passengers. It can be constructed as a very long and mainly horizontally aligned launch track for spacelaunch, targeted upwards at the end, partly by bending of the track upwards and partly by Earth's curvature in the other direction.

Natural elevations, such as mountains, may facilitate the construction of the distant, upwardly targeted part. The higher up the track terminates, the less resistance from the atmosphere the launched object will encounter.

The 40 megajoules per kilogram or less kinetic energy of projectiles launched at up to 9000 m/s velocity (if including extra for drag losses) towards low Earth orbit is a few kilowatt-hours per kilogram if efficiencies are relatively high, which accordingly has been hypothesized to be under $1 of electrical energy cost per kilogram shipped to LEO, though total costs would be far more than electricity alone. By being mainly located slightly above, on or beneath the ground, a mass driver may be easier to maintain compared with many other structures of non-rocket spacelaunch. Whether or not underground, it needs to be housed in a pipe that is vacuum pumped in order to prevent internal air drag, such as with a mechanical shutter kept closed most of the time but a plasma window used during the moments of firing to prevent loss of vacuum.

A mass driver on Earth would usually be a compromise system. A mass driver would accelerate a payload up to some high speed which would not be enough for orbit. It would then release the payload, which would complete the launch with rockets. This would drastically reduce the amount of velocity needed to be provided by rockets to reach orbit. Well under a tenth of orbital velocity from a small rocket thruster is enough to raise perigee if a design prioritizes minimizing such, but hybrid proposals optionally reduce requirements for the mass driver itself by having a greater portion of delta-v by a rocket burn (or orbital momentum exchange tether). On Earth, a mass-driver design could possibly use well-tested maglev components.

To launch a space vehicle with humans on board, a mass driver's track would need to be almost 1000 kilometres long if providing almost all the velocity to Low Earth Orbit, though a lesser length could still provide major launch assist. Required length, if accelerating mainly at near a constant maximum acceptable g-force for passengers, is proportional to velocity squared. For instance, half of the velocity goal could correspond to a tunnel a quarter as long needing to be constructed, for the same acceleration. For rugged objects, much higher accelerations may suffice, allowing a far shorter track, potentially circular or helical (spiral). Another concept involves a large ring design whereby a space vehicle would circle the ring numerous times, gradually gaining speed, before being released into a launch corridor leading skyward.

Mass drivers have been proposed for the disposal of nuclear waste in space: a projectile launched at much above Earth's escape velocity would escape the Solar System, with atmospheric passage at such speed calculated as survivable through an elongated projectile and a very substantial heatshield.

== Spacecraft-based mass drivers ==
A spacecraft could carry a mass driver as its primary engine. With a suitable source of electrical power (probably a nuclear reactor) the spaceship could then use the mass driver to accelerate pieces of matter of almost any sort, boosting itself in the opposite direction. At the smallest scale of reaction mass, this type of drive is called an ion drive.

No absolute theoretical limit is known for the size, acceleration or muzzle energy of linear motors. However, practical engineering constraints apply for such as the power-to-mass ratio, waste heat dissipation, and the energy intake able to be supplied and handled. Exhaust velocity is best neither too low nor too high.

There is a mission-dependent limited optimal exhaust velocity and specific impulse for any thruster constrained by a limited amount of onboard spacecraft power. Thrust and momentum from exhaust, per unit mass expelled, scales up linearly with its velocity (momentum = mv), yet kinetic energy and energy input requirements scale up faster with velocity squared (kinetic energy = 1/2 mv^{2}). Too low an exhaust velocity would excessively increase propellant mass needed under the rocket equation, with too high a fraction of energy going into accelerating propellant not used yet. Higher exhaust velocity has both benefit and tradeoff, increasing propellant usage efficiency (more momentum per unit mass of propellant expelled) but decreasing thrust and the current rate of spacecraft acceleration if available input power is constant (less momentum per unit of energy given to propellant).

Electric propulsion methods like mass drivers are systems where energy does not come from the propellant itself. (This contrasts with chemical rockets where propulsive efficiency varies with the ratio of exhaust velocity to vehicle velocity at the time, but near maximum obtainable specific impulse tends to be a design goal when corresponding to the most energy released from reacting propellants). Although the specific impulse of an electric thruster itself optionally could range up to where mass drivers merge into particle accelerators with fractional-lightspeed exhaust velocity for tiny particles, trying to use extreme exhaust velocity to accelerate a far slower spacecraft could be suboptimally low thrust when the energy available from a spacecraft's reactor or power source is limited (a lesser analogue of feeding onboard power to a row of spotlights, photons being an example of an extremely low momentum to energy ratio).

For instance, if limited onboard power fed to its engine was the dominant limitation on how much payload a hypothetical spacecraft could shuttle (such as if intrinsic propellant economic cost was minor from usage of extraterrestrial soil or ice), ideal exhaust velocity would rather be around 62.75% of total mission delta v if operating at constant specific impulse, except greater optimization could come from varying exhaust velocity during the mission profile (as possible with some thruster types, including mass drivers and variable specific impulse magnetoplasma rockets).

Since a mass driver could use any type of mass for reaction mass to move the spacecraft, a mass driver or some variation seems ideal for deep-space vehicles that scavenge reaction mass from found resources.

One possible drawback of the mass driver is that it has the potential to send solid reaction mass travelling at dangerously high relative speeds into useful orbits and traffic lanes. To overcome this problem, most schemes plan to throw finely-divided dust. Alternatively, liquid oxygen could be used as reaction mass, which upon release would boil down to its molecular state. Propelling the reaction mass to solar escape velocity is another way to ensure that it will not remain a hazard.

== Hybrid mass drivers ==
A mass driver on a spacecraft could be used to "reflect" masses from a stationary mass driver. Each deceleration and acceleration of the mass contributes to the momentum of the spacecraft. The lightweight, fast spacecraft need not carry reaction mass, and does not need much electricity beyond the amount needed to replace losses in the electronics, while the immobile support facility can run off power plants able to be much larger than the spacecraft if needed. This could be considered a form of beam-powered propulsion (a macroscopic-scale analogue of a particle beam propelled magsail). A similar system could also deliver pellets of fuel to a spacecraft to power another propulsion system.

Another theoretical use for this concept of propulsion can be found in space fountains, a system in which a continuous stream of pellets in a circular track holds up a tall structure.

== Mass drivers as weapons ==
Small to moderate size high-acceleration electromagnetic projectile launchers are currently undergoing active research by the US Navy for use as ground-based or ship-based weapons (most often railguns but coilguns in some cases). On larger scale than weapons currently near deployment but sometimes suggested in long-range future projections, a sufficiently high velocity linear motor, a mass driver, could in theory be used as intercontinental artillery (or, if built on the Moon or in orbit, used to attack a location on Earth's surface). As the mass driver would be located further up the gravity well than the theoretical targets, it would enjoy a significant energy imbalance in terms of counter-attack.

== Practical attempts ==
One of the first engineering descriptions of an "Electric Gun" appears in the technical supplement of the 1937 science fiction novel "Zero to Eighty" by "Akkad Pseudoman", a pen name for the Princeton physicist and electrical entrepreneur Edwin Fitch Northrup. Dr. Northrup built prototype coil guns powered by kHz-frequency three-phase electrical generators, and the book contains photographs of some of these prototypes. The book describes a fictional circumnavigation of the moon by a two-person vehicle launched by a Northrup electric gun.

Later prototype mass drivers have been built since 1976 (Mass Driver 1), some constructed by the U.S. Space Studies Institute in order to prove their properties and practicality. Military R&D on coilguns is related, as are maglev trains.

SpinLaunch, a company founded in 2014, conducted the initial test of their test accelerator in October 2021.

== See also ==
- Coilgun – Artillery using coils to electromagnetically propel a projectile
- Electromagnetic Aircraft Launch System – US Navy aircraft launching system
- Electromagnetic catapult – Aircraft launching system
- Helical railgun – Multi-turn railgun that reduces current by a factor equal to the number of turns
- Launch loop – Proposed system for launching objects into orbit
- Light-gas gun – Gun designed to generate very high speed
- Plasma railgun – Linear accelerator
- Railgun – Electromagnetic projectile launcher
- Ram accelerator – Projectile launcher that uses supersonic fuel-air combustion outside of an engine
- Space fountain – Extremely tall tower meant to launch spacecraft via pellets in vacuum tubes
- Spacecraft propulsion – Method used to accelerate spacecraft

=== People ===
- Eric Laithwaite – British electrical engineer (1921–1997)
- Gerard K. O'Neill – American physicist, author, and inventor (1927–1992)
- Henry Kolm – American physicist (1924–2010)
