= 2081: A Hopeful View of the Human Future =

Book by Gerard K. O'Neill

- Author: Gerard K. O'Neill
- Illustrator: Cal Sacks
- Subject: Futurology
- Publisher: Simon & Schuster
- Publication date: 1981
- Publication place: United States
- Media type: Print (Hardcover)
- Pages: 284 pp (first edition)
- ISBN: 978-0-671-24257-2
- OCLC: 7205001
- Dewey Decimal: 303.4 19
- LC Class: CB161 .O53

2081: A Hopeful View of the Human Future is a 1981 book by Princeton physicist Gerard K. O'Neill. The book is an attempt to predict the social and technological state of humanity 100 years in the future. O'Neill's positive attitude towards both technology and human potential distinguished this book from gloomy predictions of a Malthusian catastrophe by contemporary scientists. Paul R. Ehrlich wrote in 1968 in The Population Bomb, "in the 1970s and 1980s hundreds of millions of people will starve to death". The Club of Rome's 1972 Limits to Growth predicted a catastrophic end to the Industrial Revolution within 100 years from resource exhaustion and pollution.

O'Neill's contrary view had two main components. First, he analyzed the previous attempts to predict the future of society—including many catastrophes that had not materialized. Second, he extrapolated historical trends under the assumption that the obstacles identified by other authors would be overcome by five technological "Drivers of Change". He extrapolated an average American family income in 2081 of $1 million/year.

Two developments based on his own research were responsible for much of his optimism. In The High Frontier: Human Colonies in Space O'Neill described solar power satellites that provide unlimited clean energy, making it far easier for humanity to reach and exceed present developed-world living standards. Overpopulation pressures would be relieved as billions of people eventually emigrate to colonies in free space. These colonies would offer an Earth-like environment but with vastly higher productivity for industry and agriculture. These colonies and satellites would be constructed from asteroid or lunar materials launched into the desired orbits cheaply by the mass drivers O'Neill's group developed.

== Contents ==
=== Part I: The Art of Prophecy ===
Previous futurist authors he cites:

- Edward Bellamy
- J.D. Bernal
- McGeorge Bundy
- Arthur C. Clarke
- George Darwin
- J. B. S. Haldane
- Robert Heilbroner
- Aldous Huxley
- Rudyard Kipling
- Thomas More
- George Orwell
- George Thompson
- Konstantin Tsiolkovsky
- Jules Verne
- H. G. Wells
- Yevgeny Zamyatin

==== Clarke ====
Arthur C. Clarke's Profiles of the Future included a long list of predictions, many of which O'Neill endorsed. Two of his maxims that O'Neill quotes seem to sum up O'Neill's attitude, as well:

Anything that is theoretically possible will be achieved in practice, no matter what the technical difficulties, if it is desired greatly enough.

We can never run out of energy or matter, but we can all too easily run out of brains.

=== Part II: The Drivers of Change ===
Sections are included on the five key "Drivers of Change" believed by O'Neill to be the focus of future development:

- Automation
- Space Colonies
- Communications
- Computers
- Energy

O'Neill applied basic physics to understand the limits of possible change, using the history of the technology to extrapolate likely progress. He applied the history of computing to reason about how people and institutions will shape and be shaped by the likely changes. He predicted that future computers must run at a very low-voltage because of heat. The main basis of his technology extrapolation for computers is Moore's Law, one of the greatest successes of Trend estimation in predicting human progress.

His predicted the social aspects of the future of computers. He identified computers as the most certain of his five "drivers of change", because their adoption could be driven primarily by individual or local decisions, while the other four such as space colonies depended on large-scale decision-making. He observed the success of minicomputers, calculators, and the first home computers, and predicted that every home would have a computer in a hundred years. With the aid of speculations by computer pioneers such as John von Neumann and the writers of "tracts" such as Zamyatin's We, O'Neill also predicted that privacy would be under siege from computers in 2081.

O'Neill predicted that software engineering issues and the intractability of artificial intelligence problems would require massive programming efforts and very powerful processors to achieve truly usable computers. His prediction was based on the difficulties and failures of computer use he had observed in 1981, including a candid horror story of his own Princeton University library's attempt to computerize its operations. His computers of the future, represented by the robot butler his visitor to Earth encounters in 2081, included speaker-independent speech recognition and natural language processing. O'Neill correctly pointed out the huge difference between computers and human brains, and stated that, while a more human-like artificial brain is a worthy goal, computers will be vastly improved descendants of today's rather than truly intelligent and creative artificial brains.

=== Part III: The World in 2081 ===
This section was written as a series of dispatches home from "Eric C. Rawson", a native of a distant space colony called "Fox Cluster". By analogy with American religious colonists such as the Puritans and Mormons, O'Neill suggests that such a colony might have been founded by a group of pacifists who chose to live about twice as far from the Sun as Pluto in order to avoid involvement in Earth's wars. His calculations indicate that colonies at this distance could have Earth-level sunlight using a mirror the same weight as the colony itself. Eric pays a visit to the Earth of 2081 to take care of family business and explore a world that is nearly as foreign to him as it is to us.

After each dispatch, O'Neill added a section that described his reasoning for each situation the visitor described, such as riding a "floater" train going thousands of miles per hour in vacuum, interacting with a household robot or visiting a fully enclosed Pennsylvania city with a tropical climate in midwinter. Each section was written from his perspective as a physicist. For example, his description of "Honolulu, Pennsylvania" included multiple roof layers that could be retracted in good weather. The city enjoyed an artificial tropical climate all year because of internal climate controls and advanced insulation. He also proposed magnetically levitated "floater" trains moving in very-low-pressure tunnels that would replace airplanes on heavily traveled routes.

=== Part IV: Wild Cards ===
This section explores not the most probable outcomes, but "the limits of the possible": how likely some scenarios O'Neill considered less probable are, and what they might mean. These included nuclear annihilation, attaining immortality, and contact with extraterrestrial civilizations. For this last case, he presents a thought experiment about how a hypothetical alien civilization, the "Primans", could explore the galaxy with self-replicating robots, monitoring every planetary system in the Galaxy without betraying their own position, and destroying intelligent life (by building giant mirrors to incinerate the planet) if they felt threatened. This experiment seems to prove that conflict or even surprise contact with an intelligent alien life form—that staple of science fiction—is highly unlikely.

== See also ==
- Orbiting skyhooks

=== Prediction ===
- Futures studies
- 2000s in science and technology

=== Technologies discussed ===
- Space advocacy
- Space technology
- Space colonization
- Solar power satellite
- Asteroid mining
- Space elevator
- Space manufacturing
- Space mining
- Space-based industry
- Domed city

== Bibliography ==
- O'Neill, Gerard K. (1977). The High Frontier: Human Colonies in Space. William Morrow & Company. ISBN 978-0-9622379-0-4.
- O'Neill, Gerard K. (1977). Space-Based Manufacturing from Nonterrestrial Materials. Amer Inst of Aeronautics. ISBN 978-0-915928-21-7.
- O'Neill, Gerard K. (1981). 2081: A Hopeful View of the Human Future. Simon and Schuster. ISBN 978-0-671-44751-9.
- NSS review of 2081 Archived 2008-05-11 at the Wayback Machine
