= Space Studies Institute =

- Logo of the Space Studies Institute
- Abbreviation: SSI
- Formation: 1977
- Founders: Gerard K. O'Neill
- Type: Space advocacy, 501(c)3 Education
- Purpose: "Open the energy and material resources of space for human benefit within our lifetime"
- Headquarters: Mojave, California, United States
- Official language: English
- Key people: President and CEO Gary C Hudson; Trustee Freeman Dyson
- Website: ssi.org

Space Studies Institute is a not-for-profit organization that was founded in 1977 by Princeton University Professor Gerard K. O'Neill.

In 2009 SSI moved its operations from its long-term base in Princeton, New Jersey, to Mojave, California. SSI is involved in several initiatives, including a solar sail project that it is developing with Carnegie Mellon University and an effort to find asteroids that could be mined for valuable materials. The use of extraterrestrial resources in space settlement has received increasing attention in recent years.

The Institute has sponsored research studies on several transport systems for the development of space. Their first program was in the development of prototype mass driver systems. They are also studying the use of an Orbital Transfer Vehicle as a component of space manufacturing. Other areas of research include a search for Earth-Sun Trojan asteroids, a design study of a Lunar Polar Probe to search for water and useful volatiles at the poles of the Moon, and studies of reuse of the Space Shuttle external tank. O'Neill performed a study of a large space habitat named Island Three that could house 10,000,000 people.

== See also ==
- Space advocacy
- Space manufacturing
- Associated Universities, Inc.
- Space Science Institute
