= Mass Driver 1 =

Electromagnetic launcher for a rocket

Constructed in 1976 and 1977, Mass Driver 1 was an early demonstration of the concept of the mass driver, a form of electromagnetic launcher, which in principle could also be configured as a rocket motor, using asteroidal materials for reaction mass and energized by solar or other electric power.

As originally envisioned, the mass driver was intended to launch payloads from a lunar base to L5, the fifth Lagrange point in which a stable orbit can be maintained. This is where Gerard K. O'Neill proposed building a space colony (of the five Lagrange points, only L4 and L5 are truly stable, both for the real physical Earth/Moon system as well as for the ideal restricted 3-body case).

The model consisted of a series of some 20 drive coils through which a small armature (called the bucket) traveled, pushed by the pulsed magnetic fields of the drive coils. The bucket rode on four rails made from copper plumbing tubes, through which was fed direct current from several car batteries connected in series. It was an epoxy glass cylinder, roughly 10 cm in diameter by 20 cm long, wrapped with a coil of aluminium wire, energized by the batteries. The copper rails were mounted onto the interior of the drive coils, and the bucket was held onto the copper rails by spring-loaded beryllium copper strips with automotive carbon brushes mounted on the ends. The passage of the bucket depressed microswitches which triggered the discharge of capacitors through the drive coils.

The current in the bucket coil interacted, by the Lorentz force, with the pulsed magnetic fields from the drive coils to accelerate the bucket. When the bucket coil was cooled by liquid nitrogen to reduce its electrical resistance, it was able to achieve an acceleration of around 30 g (300 m/s²).

The mass driver was inspired and designed by Gerard K. O'Neill of Princeton University (who was on sabbatical at MIT during the 1976–77 academic year) and Henry Kolm of MIT. It was built under their direction by students at MIT, largely using material scavenged from the scrap heap at the Bitter Magnet Lab at MIT. A demonstration at the May 1977 Princeton University Space Manufacturing Facilities Conference was covered by Nova.

Ultimately O'Neill and Kolm hoped to launch payloads to escape velocity from Earth, thus reducing the cost of space launch to only about ten dollars a pound, the cost of electric energy, by eliminating the need to launch rocket fuel. Further development awaits the day when the space launch market off-Earth is large enough to justify the cost.

The idea for the mass driver may have come from the 1966 Robert A. Heinlein book The Moon Is a Harsh Mistress. Heinlein referred to a similar device as an "induction catapult".

== See also ==
- Non-rocket spacelaunch
