= Charles Nicol =

American literary scholar (1940–2020)

Charles Nicol (1940 – July 26, 2020) is known primarily as an expert on the life and works of author Vladimir Nabokov, and also wrote widely on fiction (particularly science fiction and detective fiction) and popular culture. He was a professor in the Department of English at Indiana State University.

== Academic and publishing history ==
Nicol published on Nabokov since 1967. In 1970 he completed a PhD at Bowling Green State University with a dissertation on Vladimir Nabokov. He was elected president of the International Vladimir Nabokov Society twice (including as its first president). In 1984 he became a Fulbright senior lecturer.

He wrote for The American Spectator, The Atlantic, The Baltimore Sun, Bookletter, The Chicago Tribune, Harper's Magazine, The Kansas City Star, The National Review, The New York Times, The Saturday Review, Science Fiction Studies, and The Washington Post.

== Major works ==
- J.E. Rivers and Charles Nicol, Nabokov's Fifth Arc: Nabokov and Others on His Life's Work (1982)
- Charles Nicol and Gennady Barabtarlo, A small alpine form: studies in Nabokov's short fiction (1993)
