= Henry Kolm =

American physicist (1924–2010)

Henry Herbert Kolm (September 9, 1924 in Vienna – July 29, 2010 in Concord, Massachusetts) was an American physicist associated with Massachusetts Institute of Technology (MIT) for many years, with extensive expertise in high-power magnets and strong magnetic fields.

== Senior Scientist at MIT ==
Henry Kolm was a long-time associate of the Francis Bitter National Magnet Laboratory. As such, his goal was the creation and application of high magnetic fields. He has also worked on magnetic levitation for transit applications and on various electromagnetic space launch concepts including the MIT Mass Driver 1 (1976–77), continuing into the 1980s.

Over the years, he worked with Francis Bitter, Gerard K. O'Neill, and Eric Drexler, among others.

== Comment regarding interrogation methods ==
In an op-ed column, Frank Rich quoted Kolm as saying, "We got more information out of a German general with a game of chess or Ping-Pong than they do today, with their torture", in recounting his experience interrogating Colonel Rudolf Hess, Hitler's personal military advisor (not to be confused with Rudolf Hess, Hitler's deputy) over a chessboard.

== See also ==
- Railgun
- Coil gun
- Mass Driver 1
- Helical railgun
- Maglev train
- Piezoelectricity

== Bibliography ==
- Henry H. Kolm; Richard D. Thornton (October 1973). "Electromagnetic Flight". Scientific American. 229 (4). Springer Nature: 17–25. Bibcode:1973SciAm.229d..17K. doi:10.1038/scientificamerican1073-17.
