= Bernal sphere =

Long-term space habitat proposal

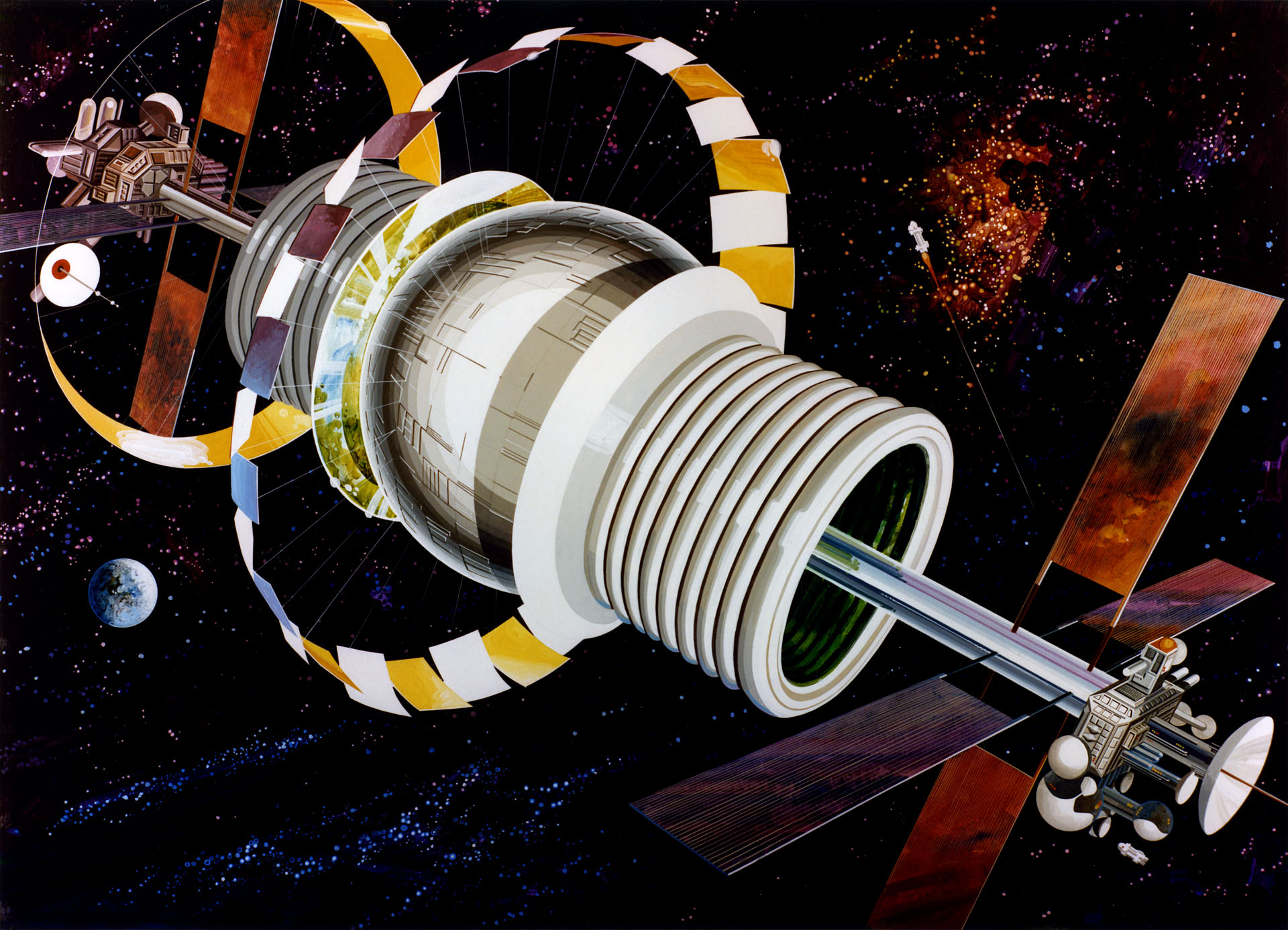
Exterior of a Bernal sphere

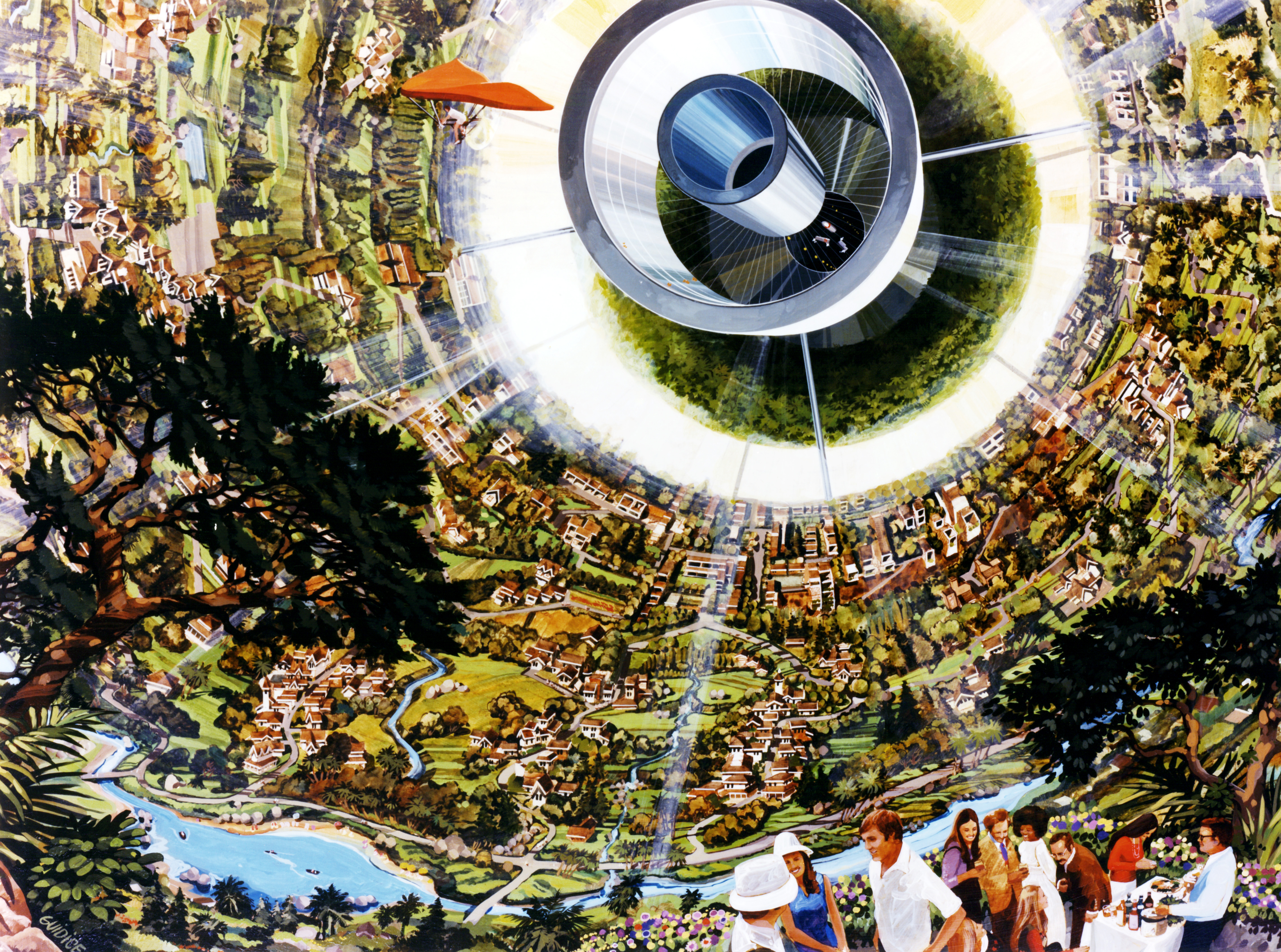
Interior of a Bernal sphere

A Bernal sphere is a type of space settlement intended as a long-term home for permanent residents, first proposed in 1929 by John Desmond Bernal.

Bernal's original proposal described a hollow non-rotating spherical shell 10 mi (16 km) in diameter, with a target population of 20,000 to 30,000 people. The Bernal sphere would be filled with air.

== O'Neill versions ==
=== Island One ===
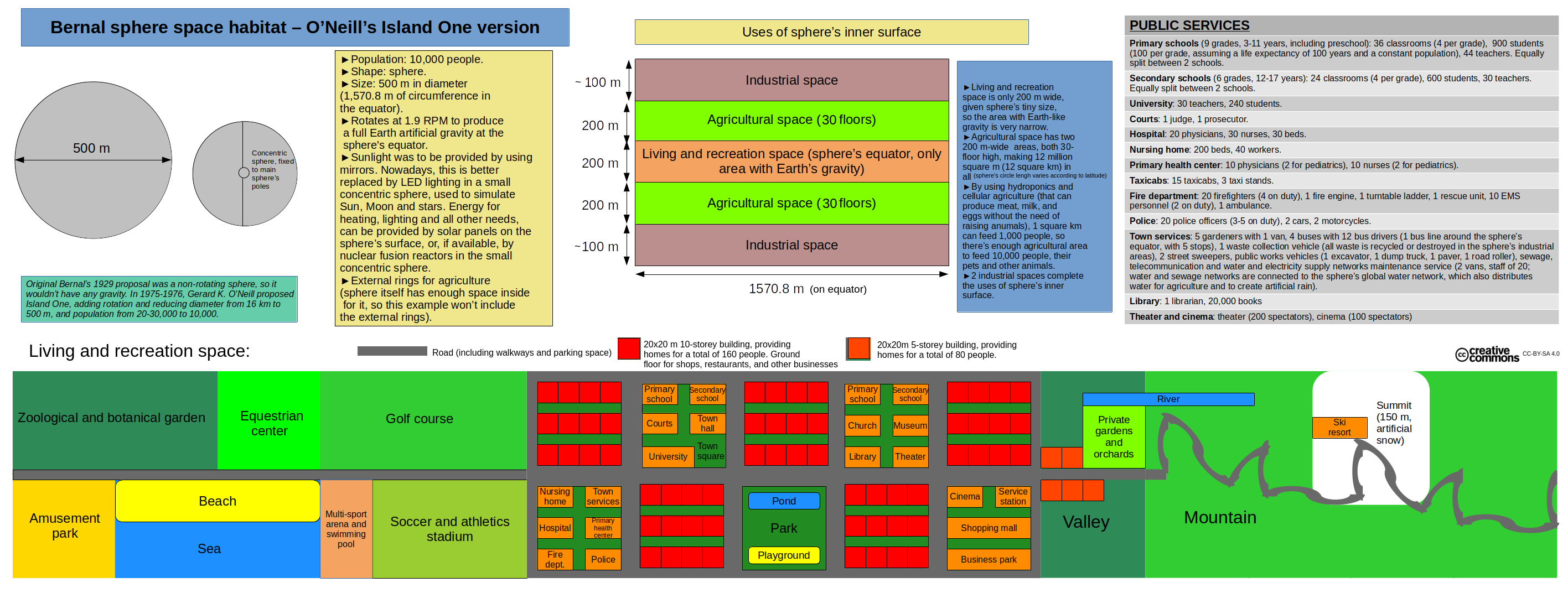
Example layout for an Island One-type Bernal sphere

In a series of studies held at Stanford University in 1975 and 1976 with the purpose of speculating on designs for future space colonies, Dr. Gerard K. O'Neill proposed Island One, a modified Bernal sphere with a diameter of only 500 m (1,600 ft) rotating at 1.9 RPM to produce a full Earth artificial gravity at the sphere's equator. The result would be an interior landscape that would resemble a large valley running all the way around the equator of the sphere. Island One would be capable of providing living and recreation space for a population of approximately 10,000 people, with a "Crystal Palace" habitat (consisting of several rings attached to the sphere at each pole) used for agriculture. Sunlight was to be provided to the interior of the sphere using external mirrors to direct it in through large windows near the poles. The form of a sphere was chosen for its optimum ability to contain air pressure and its optimum mass-efficiency at providing radiation shielding.

=== Island Two ===
O'Neill envisioned the next generation of space habitat as a larger version of Island One. Island Two would be approximately 1800 meters in diameter, yielding an equatorial circumference of nearly six and a half kilometers (four miles). The size was driven by economics; the habitat was to be small enough to allow for efficient transportation within the habitat and large enough to support an efficient industrial base.

== Image gallery ==
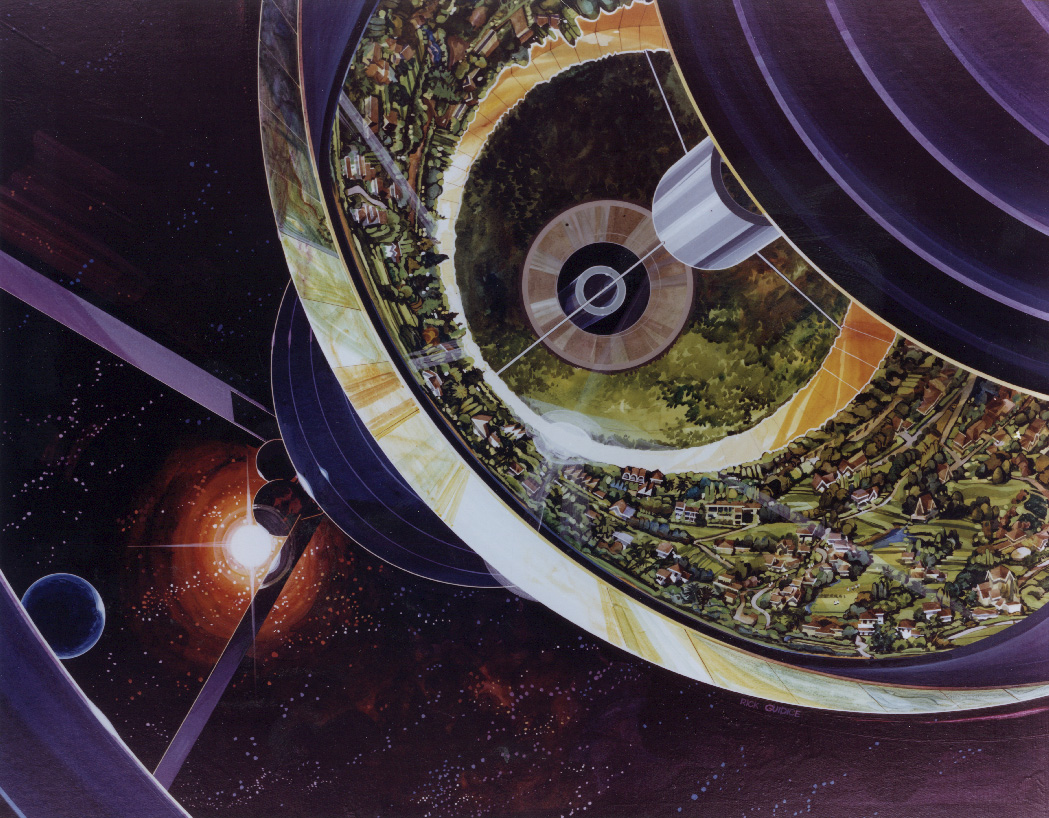
The inside of the sphere as viewed from the sunlight "portal"

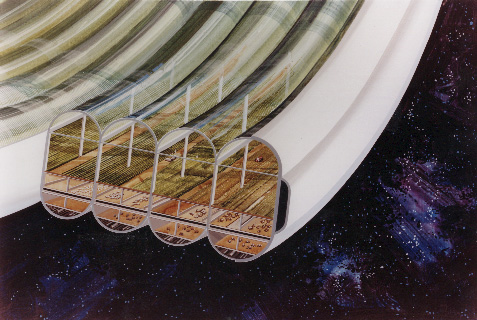
Agricultural module of a Bernal sphere

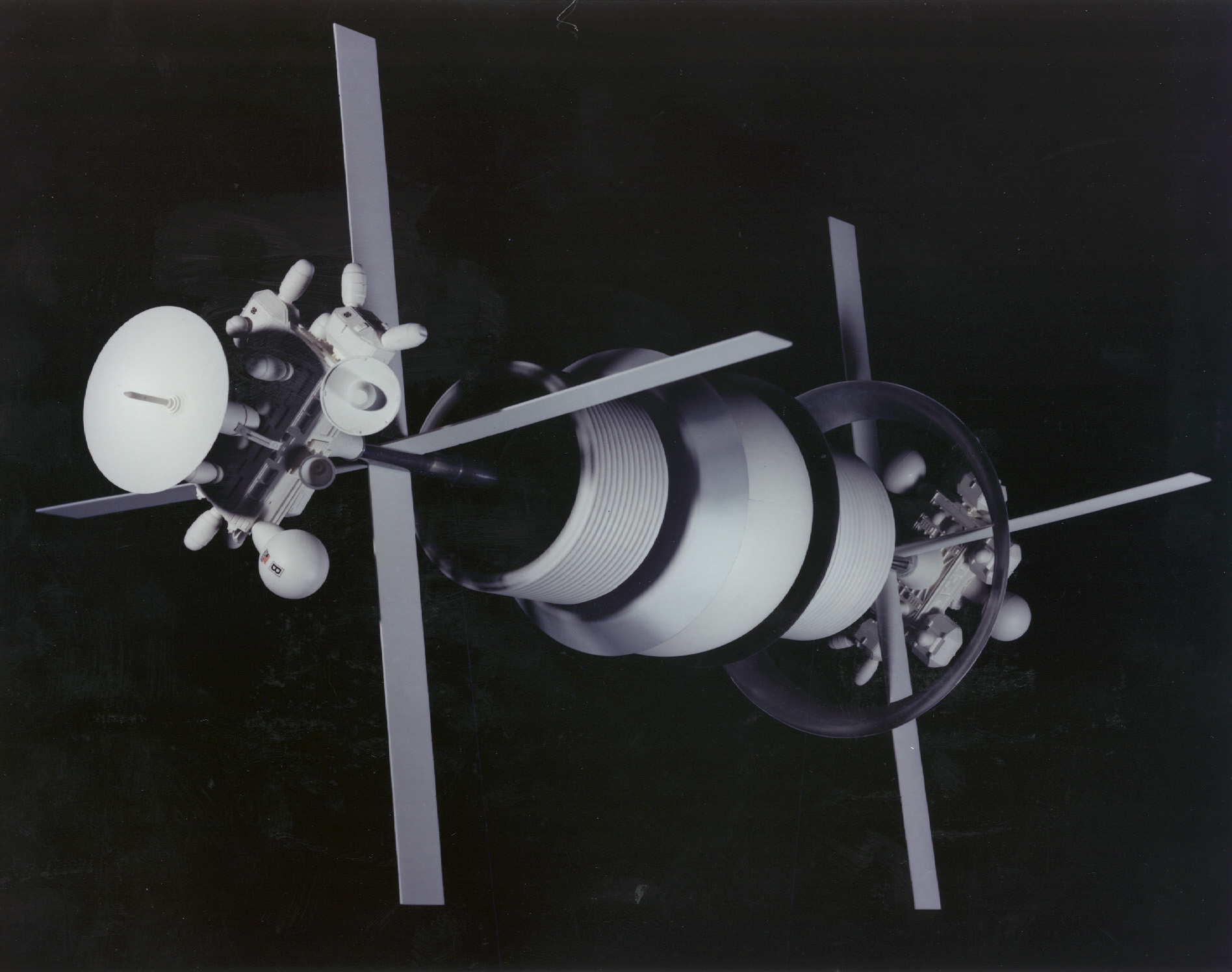
Exterior of a Bernal sphere

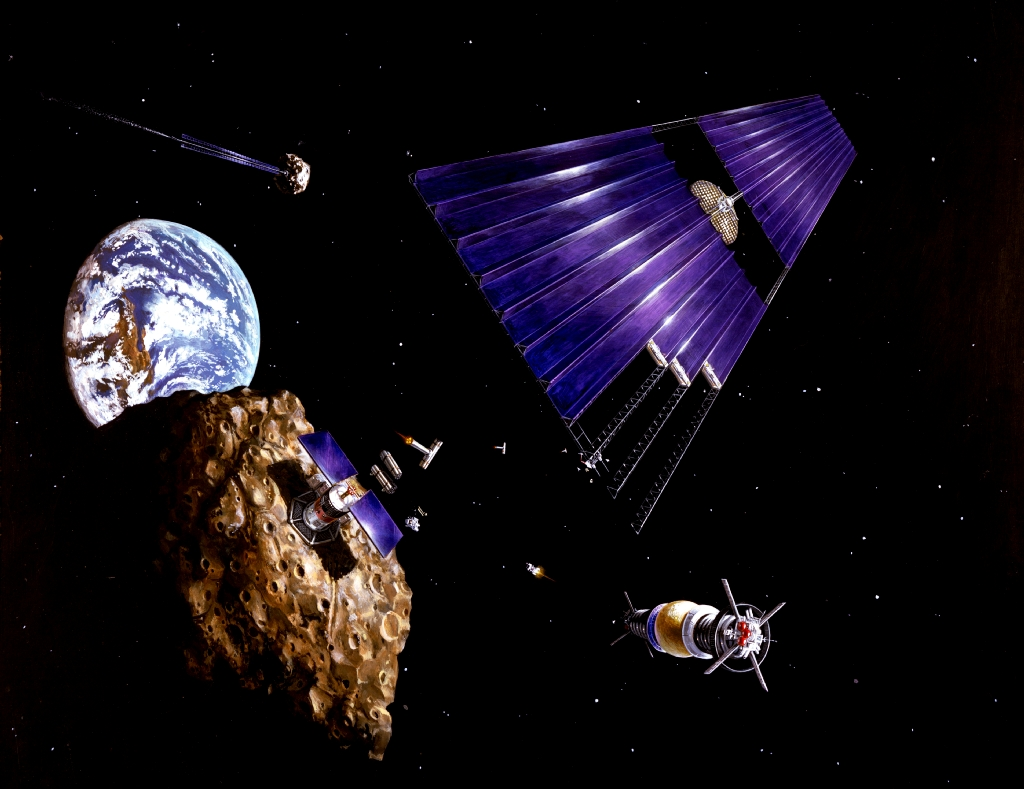
A Bernal sphere next to a solar power satellite and an asteroid mining station

== In popular culture ==
- The video game Sonic Adventure 2 features a fictional Bernal sphere space colony called "ARK". In this colony, Doctor Eggman's grandfather (The Professor Gerald Robotnik) created Shadow the Hedgehog to cure his granddaughter Maria's illness, but the Guardians Units of Nations (G.U.N.) considered Shadow as a threat, so they shut down the space colony and neutralized everyone who knew about Shadow, including Maria, who died trying to protect him. A mistranslation in the English dub of Sonic Adventure 2 has Tails incorrectly refer to the ARK as a "Bernoulli spherical space colony".
- In the setting of the anime television series Mobile Suit Gundam 00, space colonies are based on underdeveloped technology, and only small-sized colonies, such as the Bernal sphere-shaped "Quanqiu" located in Lagrange 3, make an appearance.
- In the anime television series Mobile Suit Gundam ZZ, the space colony Moon Moon is a Bernal sphere.

== See also ==
- Dyson sphere
- Space habitat
  - O'Neill cylinder aka Island III, the brother design to Island I
  - Rotating wheel space station
  - Stanford torus
- Space colonization
