= Electro-Magnetic Laboratory Rail Gun =

Gun driven by Magnetism, owned by the ONR

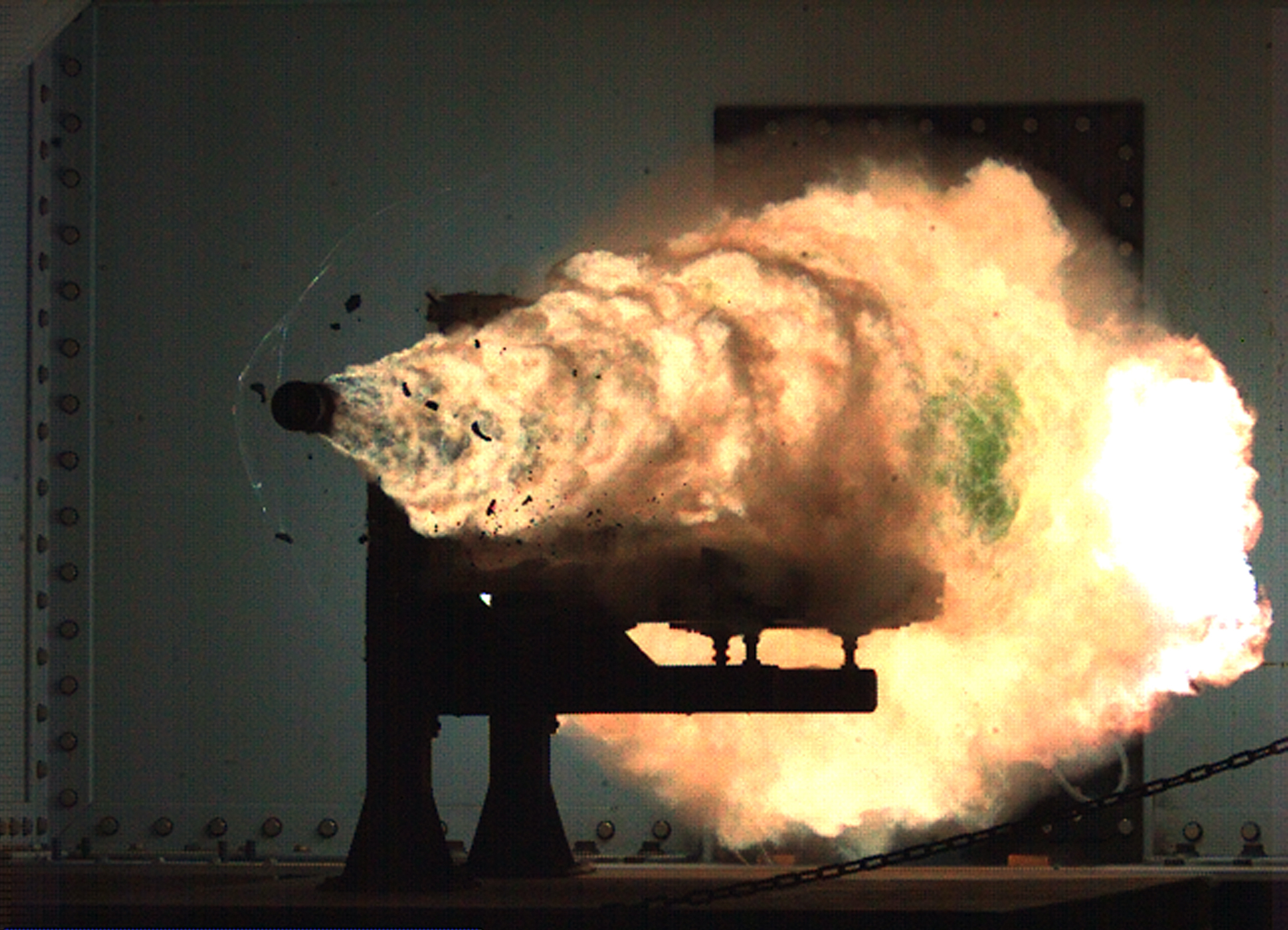
Naval Surface Warfare Center test firing in January 2008

The Electro-Magnetic Laboratory Rail Gun is a 32-megajoule electro-magnetic laboratory rail gun being evaluated by the US Office of Naval Research (ONR) Naval Air Warfare and Weapons Department. The US Navy is pursuing development of the launcher system through two industry teams – General Atomics and BAE Systems – to reduce risk in the program and to foster innovation in next-generation shipboard weapons. The same amount of energy is released by the detonation of 4.8 kg (11 lb) of C4.

The two prototype demonstrators incorporate advanced composites and improved barrel life performance resulting from development efforts on laboratory railgun systems located at the Naval Research Laboratory and NSWC-Dahlgren Division.

A 32 Megajoule prototype has been delivered by BAE Systems. This particular rail gun delivers fire from up to 220 miles in range, around 10 times the distance capable of standard ship mounted guns with rounds landing more swiftly and with little or no warning compared to a volley of Tomahawk cruise missiles. BAE was awarded the contract to build the prototype in July 2006. The first industry-built launcher, a 32-megajoule prototype demonstrator made by BAE Systems, arrived at the Naval Surface Warfare Center (NSWC) Dahlgren in January 2012.

A previous 32-megajoule installation existed at Kirkcudbright Electromagnetic Launch Facility at the Dundrennan Weapons Testing Range in Scotland, United Kingdom.

== Development program ==
The Electro-Magnetic Laboratory Rail Gun is a long-range naval weapon that fires projectiles using electricity instead of chemical propellants. Magnetic fields created by high electrical currents accelerate a sliding metal conductor, or armature, between two rails to launch projectiles at 4,500 mph to 5,600 mph. Electricity generated by the ship is stored over several seconds in the pulsed power system. Next, an electric pulse is sent to the railgun, creating an electromagnetic force accelerating the projectile to Mach 7.5. Using its extreme speed on impact, the kinetic energy warhead eliminates the hazards of high explosives in the ship and unexploded ordnance on the battlefield.

The program was initiated in 2005. The goal during Phase I is a proof-of-concept demonstration at 32 mega-joule muzzle energy has been achieved. A future weapon system at this energy level would be capable of launching a projectile to a range of 100-nautical miles. This launch energy has the advantage of being able to stress many components to evaluate full-scale mechanical and electromagnetic forces.

Phase I was focused on the development of launcher technology with adequate service life, development of reliable pulsed power technology and component risk reduction for the projectile.

Phase II, which started in 2012, was planned to advance the technology for transition to an acquisition program, concentrating on demonstrating a repeated rate fire capability. Efforts were to be made to develop thermal management techniques required for sustained firing rates for both the launcher system and the pulsed power system.

On June 1, 2021 The Drive reported that the US navy's proposed 2022 fiscal year budget had no funding for railgun research and development. Technical challenges could not be overcome, such as the massive forces of firing wearing out the barrel after only one or two dozen shots, and a rate of fire too low to be useful for missile defense.

== History ==
In 1944, during World War II, Joachim Hänsler of Germany's Ordnance Office proposed the first theoretically viable railgun. By late 1944, the theory behind his electric anti-aircraft gun had been worked out sufficiently to allow the Luftwaffe's Flak Command to issue a specification, which demanded a muzzle velocity of 2,000 m/s (4,500 mph; 7,200 km/h; 6,600 ft/s) and a projectile containing 0.5 kg (1.1 lb) of explosive. The guns were to be mounted in batteries of six firing twelve rounds per minute, and it was to fit existing 12.8 cm FlaK 40 mounts. It was never built. When details were discovered after the war it aroused much interest and a more detailed study was done, culminating with a 1947 report which concluded that it was theoretically feasible, but that each gun would need enough power to illuminate half of Chicago.
