= Railgun =

Electromagnetic projectile launcher

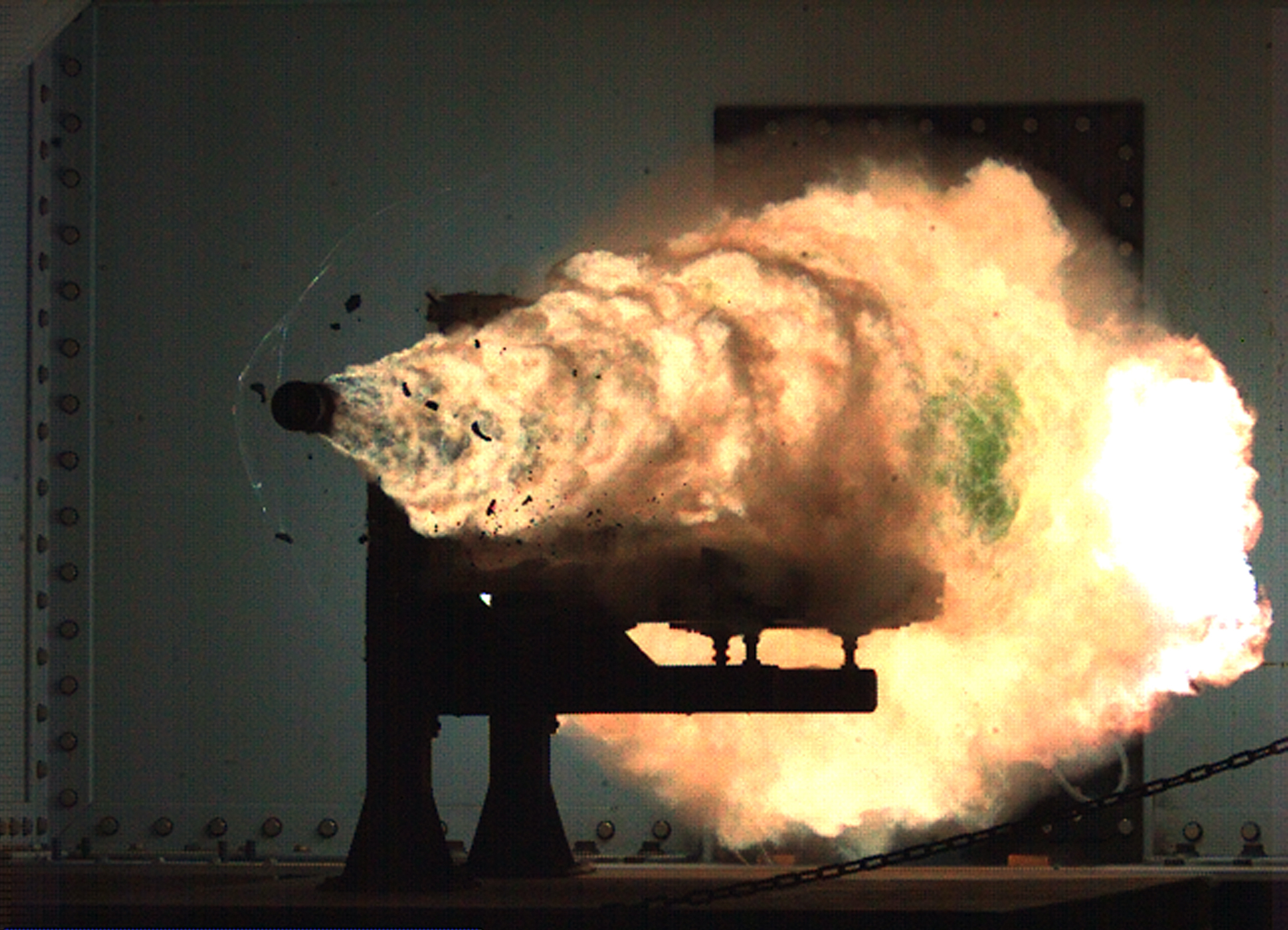
Test firing at the United States Naval Surface Warfare Center Dahlgren Division in January 2008. The fireball is a result of pieces of the projectile shearing off during launch and igniting mid-air.

A railgun or rail gun, sometimes referred to as a rail cannon, is a linear motor device, typically designed as a ranged weapon, that uses electromagnetic force to launch high-velocity projectiles. The projectile normally does not contain explosives, instead relying on the projectile's high kinetic energy to inflict damage. The railgun uses a pair of parallel rail-shaped conductors (simply called rails), along which a sliding projectile called an armature is accelerated by the electromagnetic effects of a current that flows down one rail, into the armature and then back along the other rail. It is based on principles similar to those of the homopolar motor.

As of 2020, railguns have been researched as weapons using electromagnetic forces to impart a very high kinetic energy to a projectile (e.g. dart ammunition) rather than using conventional propellants. While explosive-powered military guns cannot readily achieve a muzzle velocity of more than ≈2 km/s (Mach 5.9), railguns can readily exceed 3 km/s (Mach 8.8). For a similar projectile, the range of railguns may exceed that of conventional guns. The destructive force of a projectile depends upon its kinetic energy (proportional to its mass and the square of its velocity) at the point of impact. Because of the potentially higher velocity of a railgun, its force may be much greater than conventionally launched projectiles of the same mass. The absence of explosive propellants or warheads to store and handle, as well as the low cost of projectiles compared to conventional weaponry, are also advantageous.

== Basics ==
Schematic diagram of a railgun

The railgun in its simplest form differs from a traditional electric motor in that no use is made of additional field windings (or permanent magnets). This basic configuration is formed by a single loop of current and thus requires high currents (on the order of one million amperes) to produce sufficient accelerations (and muzzle velocities). A relatively common variant of this configuration is the augmented railgun in which the driving current is channeled through additional pairs of parallel conductors, arranged to increase ('augment') the magnetic field experienced by the moving armature. These arrangements reduce the current required for a given acceleration. In electric motor terminology, augmented railguns are usually series-wound configurations. Some railguns also use strong neodymium magnets with the field perpendicular to the current flow to increase the force on the projectile.

The armature may be an integral part of the projectile, but it may also be configured to accelerate a separate, electrically isolated or non-conducting projectile. Solid, metallic sliding conductors are often the preferred form of railgun armature but plasma or 'hybrid' armatures can also be used. A plasma armature is formed by an arc of ionised gas that is used to push a solid, non-conducting payload in a similar manner to the propellant gas pressure in a conventional gun. A hybrid armature uses a pair of plasma contacts to interface a metallic armature to the gun rails. Solid armatures may also 'transition' into hybrid armatures, typically after a particular velocity threshold is exceeded. The high current required to power a railgun can be provided by various power supply technologies, such as capacitors, pulsed power systems, and disc generators.

For potential military applications, railguns are usually of interest because they can achieve much greater muzzle velocities than guns powered by conventional chemical propellants. Increased muzzle velocities with better aerodynamically streamlined projectiles can convey the benefits of increased firing ranges while, in terms of target effects, increased terminal velocities can allow the use of kinetic energy rounds incorporating hit-to-kill guidance, as replacements for explosive shells. Therefore, typical military railgun designs aim for muzzle velocities in the range of 2,000–3,500 m/s (4,500–7,800 mph; 7,200–12,600 km/h) with muzzle energies of 5–50 megajoules (MJ). For comparison, 50 MJ is equivalent to the kinetic energy of a school bus weighing 5 metric tons, traveling at 509 km/h (316 mph; 141 m/s). For single loop railguns, these mission requirements require launch currents of a few million amperes, so a typical railgun power supply might be designed to deliver a launch current of 5 MA for a few milliseconds. As the magnetic field strengths required for such launches will typically be approximately 10 tesla (100 kilogauss), most contemporary railgun designs are effectively air-cored, i.e., they do not use ferromagnetic materials such as iron to enhance the magnetic flux. However, if the barrel is made of a magnetically permeable material, the magnetic field strength increases because of the increase in permeability (μ = μ_{0}*μ_{r}, where μ is the effective permeability, μ_{0} is the permeability constant and μ_{r} is the relative permeability of the barrel, and $\mathbf{B}=\mu \mathbf{H}$ ). The field 'felt' by the armature is proportional to $\mathbf{B}$, so the increased field increases the force on the projectile.

Railgun velocities generally fall within the range of those achievable by two-stage light-gas guns; however, the latter are generally only considered to be suitable for laboratory use, while railguns are judged to offer some potential prospects for development as military weapons. A light gas gun, the Combustion Light Gas Gun in a 155 mm prototype form was projected to achieve 2500 m/s with a 70 caliber barrel. In some hypervelocity research projects, projectiles are 'pre-injected' into railguns, to avoid the need for a standing start, and both two-stage light-gas guns and conventional powder guns have been used for this role. In principle, if railgun power supply technology can be developed to provide safe, compact, reliable, combat survivable, and lightweight units, then the total system volume and mass needed to accommodate such a power supply and its primary fuel can become less than the required total volume and mass for a mission equivalent quantity of conventional propellants and explosive ammunition. Arguably such technology has been matured with the introduction of the electromagnetic catapult (albeit that railguns require much higher system powers, because roughly similar energies must be delivered in a few milliseconds, as opposed to a few seconds). Such a development would then convey a further military advantage in that the elimination of explosives from ships' magazines will decrease a fleet's vulnerability to enemy fire.

== History ==
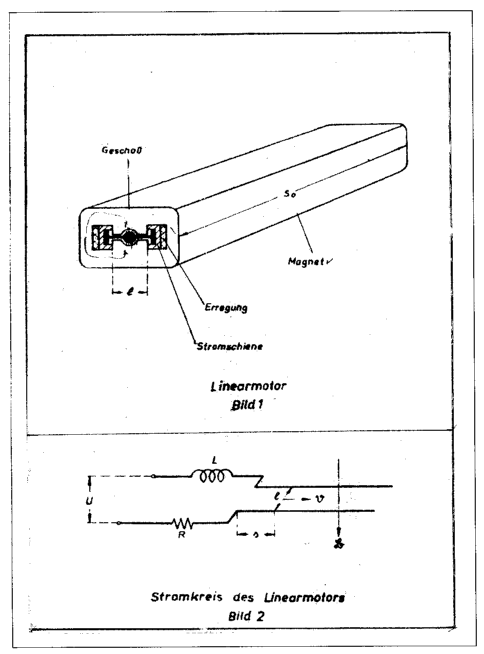
German railgun diagrams

The concept of the railgun was first introduced by French inventor André Louis Octave Fauchon-Villeplée, who created a small working model in 1917 with the help of the Société anonyme des accumulateurs Tudor (now Tudor Batteries). During World War I, the French Director of Inventions at the Ministry of Armaments, Jules-Louis Brenton, commissioned Fauchon-Villeplee to develop a 30 mm to 50 mm electric cannon on 25 July 1918, after delegates from the Commission des Inventions witnessed test trials of the working model in 1917. However, the project was abandoned once World War I ended later that year on 11 November 1918. Fauchon-Villeplee filed for a US patent on 1 April 1919, which was issued in July 1922 as patent no. 1,421,435 "Electric Apparatus for Propelling Projectiles". In his device, two parallel busbars are connected by the wings of a projectile, and the whole apparatus surrounded by a magnetic field. By passing current through busbars and projectile, a force is induced which propels the projectile along the bus-bars and into flight.

In 1923, Russian scientist A. L. Korol'kov detailed his criticisms of Fauchon-Villeplee's design, arguing against some of the claims that Fauchon-Villeplee made about the advantages of his invention. Korol'kov eventually concluded that while the construction of a long-range electric gun was within the realm of possibility, the practical application of Fauchon-Villeplee's railgun was hindered by its enormous electric energy consumption and its need for a special electric generator of considerable capacity to power it.

In 1944, during World War II, Joachim Hänsler of Germany's Ordnance Office proposed the first theoretically viable railgun. By late 1944, the theory behind his electric anti-aircraft gun had been worked out sufficiently to allow the Luftwaffe's Flak Command to issue a specification, which demanded a muzzle velocity of 2,000 m/s (4,500 mph; 7,200 km/h; 6,600 ft/s) and a projectile containing 0.5 kg (1.1 lb) of explosive. The guns were to be mounted in batteries of six firing twelve rounds per minute, and it was to fit existing 12.8 cm FlaK 40 mounts. It was never built. When details were discovered after the war it aroused much interest and a more detailed study was done, culminating with a 1947 report which concluded that it was theoretically feasible, but that each gun would need enough power to illuminate half of Chicago.

During 1950, Sir Mark Oliphant, an Australian physicist and first director of the Research School of Physical Sciences at the new Australian National University, initiated the design and construction of the world's largest (500 megajoule) homopolar generator. This machine was operational from 1962 and was later used to power a large-scale railgun that was used as a scientific experiment.

In 1980, the Ballistic Research Laboratory (later consolidated to form the U.S. Army Research Laboratory) began a long-term program of theoretical and experimental research on railguns. The work was conducted predominantly at the Aberdeen Proving Ground, and much of the early research drew inspiration from the railgun experiments performed by the Australian National University. Topics of research included plasma dynamics, electromagnetic fields, telemetry, and current and heat transport. While military research into railgun technology in the United States ensued continuously in the following decades, the direction and focus that it took shifted dramatically with major changes in funding levels and the needs of different government agencies. In 1984, the formation of the Strategic Defense Initiative Organization caused research goals to shift toward establishing a constellation of satellites to intercept intercontinental ballistic missiles. As a result, the U.S. military focused on developing small guided projectiles that could withstand the high-G launch from ultra-high velocity plasma armature railguns. But after the publication of an important Defense Science Board study in 1985, the U.S. Army, Marine Corps, and DARPA were assigned to develop anti-armor, electromagnetic launch technologies for mobile ground combat vehicles. In 1990, the U.S. Army collaborated with the University of Texas at Austin to establish the Institute for Advanced Technology (IAT), which focused on research involving solid and hybrid armatures, rail-armature interactions, and electromagnetic launcher materials. The facility became the Army's first Federally Funded Research and Development Center and housed a few of the Army's electromagnetic launchers, such as the Medium Caliber Launcher.

Since 1993 the British and American governments have collaborated on a railgun project at the Dundrennan Weapons Testing Centre that culminated in the 2010 test where BAE Systems fired a 3.2 kg (7.1 lb) projectile at 18.4 megajoules (3,390 m/s [7,600 mph; 12,200 km/h; 11,100 ft/s]). In 1994, India's DRDO's Armament Research and Development Establishment developed a railgun with a 240 kJ, low inductance capacitor bank operating at 5 kV power able to launch projectiles of 3–3.5 g weight to a velocity of more than 2,000 m/s (4,500 mph; 7,200 km/h; 6,600 ft/s). In 1995, the Center for Electromagnetics at the University of Texas at Austin designed and developed a rapid-fire railgun launcher called the Cannon-Caliber Electromagnetic Gun. The launcher prototype was later tested at the U.S. Army Research Laboratory, where it demonstrated a breech efficiency over 50 percent.

In 2010, the United States Navy tested a BAE Systems-designed compact-sized railgun for ship emplacement that accelerated a 3.2 kg (7.1 lb) projectile to hypersonic velocities of approximately 3,390 m/s (7,600 mph; 12,200 km/h; 11,100 ft/s), or about Mach 10, with 18.4 MJ of kinetic energy. It was the first time that such levels of performance were reached. A 32-megajoule earlier railgun of the same design resides at the Dundrennan Weapons Testing Centre in the United Kingdom.

Low power, small scale railguns have also made popular college and amateur projects. Several amateurs actively carry out research on railguns.

== Design ==
=== Theory ===
A railgun consists of two parallel metal rails (hence the name). At one end, these rails are connected to an electrical power supply, to form the breech end of the gun. Then, if a conductive projectile is inserted between the rails (e.g., by insertion into the breech), it completes the circuit. Electrons flow from the negative terminal of the power supply up the negative rail, across the projectile, and down the positive rail, back to the power supply.

This current makes the railgun behave as an electromagnet, creating a magnetic field inside the loop formed by the length of the rails up to the position of the armature. In accordance with the right-hand rule, the magnetic field circulates around each conductor. Since the current is in the opposite direction along each rail, the net magnetic field between the rails (B) is directed at right angles to the plane formed by the central axes of the rails and the armature. In combination with the current (I) in the armature, this produces a Lorentz force which accelerates the projectile along the rails, always out of the loop (regardless of supply polarity) and away from the power supply, toward the muzzle end of the rails. There are also Lorentz forces acting on the rails and attempting to push them apart, but since the rails are mounted firmly, they cannot move.

By definition, if a current of one ampere flows in a pair of ideal infinitely long parallel conductors that are separated by a distance of one meter, then the magnitude of the force on each meter of those conductors will be exactly 0.2 micro-newtons. Furthermore, in general, the force will be proportional to the square of the magnitude of the current and inversely proportional to the distance between the conductors. It also follows that, for railguns with projectile masses of a few kg and barrel lengths of a few m, very large currents will be required to accelerate projectiles to velocities of the order of 1000 m/s.

A very large power supply, providing on the order of one million amperes of current, will create a tremendous force on the projectile, accelerating it to a speed of many kilometers per second (km/s). Although these speeds are possible, the heat generated from the propulsion of the object is enough to erode the rails rapidly. Under high-use conditions, current railguns would require frequent replacement of the rails, or to use a heat-resistant material that would be conductive enough to produce the same effect. At this time it is generally acknowledged that it will take major breakthroughs in materials science and related disciplines to produce high-powered railguns capable of firing more than a few shots from a single set of rails. The barrel must withstand these conditions for up to several rounds per minute for thousands of shots without failure or significant degradation. These parameters are well beyond the state of the art in materials science.

=== Design considerations ===
The power supply must be able to deliver large currents, sustained and controlled over a useful amount of time. The most important gauge of power supply effectiveness is the energy it can deliver. As of December 2010, the greatest known energy used to propel a projectile from a railgun was 33 megajoules. The most common forms of power supplies used in railguns are capacitors and compulsators which are slowly charged from other continuous energy sources.

The rails need to withstand enormous repulsive forces during shooting, and these forces will tend to push them apart and away from the projectile. As rail/projectile clearances increase, arcing develops, which causes rapid vaporization and extensive damage to the rail surfaces and the insulator surfaces. This limited some early research railguns to one shot per service interval.

The inductance and resistance of the rails and power supply limit the efficiency of a railgun design. Currently different rail shapes and railgun configurations are being tested, most notably by the U.S. Navy (Naval Research Laboratory), the Institute for Advanced Technology at the University of Texas at Austin, and BAE Systems.

=== Materials used ===
The rails and projectiles must be built from strong conductive materials; the rails need to survive the violence of an accelerating projectile, and heating because of the large currents and friction involved. Some erroneous work has suggested that the recoil force in railguns can be redirected or eliminated; careful theoretical and experimental analysis reveals that the recoil force acts on the breech closure just as in a chemical firearm. The rails also repel themselves via a sideways force caused by the rails being pushed by the magnetic field, just as the projectile is. The rails need to survive this without bending and must be very securely mounted. As of 2026, published material suggests that major advances in material science must be made before rails can be developed that allow railguns to fire more than a few full-power shots before replacement of the rails is required.

=== Heat dissipation ===
In current designs massive amounts of heat are created by the electricity flowing through the rails, as well as by the friction of the projectile leaving the device. This causes three main problems: melting of equipment, decreased safety of personnel, and detection by enemy forces owing to increased infrared signature. As briefly discussed above, the stresses involved in firing this sort of device require an extremely heat-resistant material. Otherwise the rails, barrel, and all equipment attached would melt or be irreparably damaged.

In practice, the rails used with most railgun designs are subject to erosion from each launch. Additionally, projectiles can be subject to some degree of ablation, and this can limit railgun life, in some cases severely.

== Applications ==
Railguns have a number of potential practical applications, primarily for the military. However, there are other theoretical applications currently being researched.

=== Launch or launch assist of spacecraft ===
Electrodynamic assistance to launch rockets has been studied. Space applications of this technology would likely involve specially formed electromagnetic coils and superconducting magnets. Composite materials would likely be used for this application.

For space launches from Earth, relatively short acceleration distances (less than a few km) would require very strong acceleration forces, higher than humans can tolerate. Other designs include a longer helical (spiral) track, or a large ring design whereby a space vehicle would circle the ring numerous times, gradually gaining speed, before being released into a launch corridor leading skyward. Nevertheless, if technically feasible and cost effective to build, imparting hyper-velocity escape velocity to a projectile launching at sea level, where the atmosphere is the most dense, may result in much of the launch velocity being lost to aerodynamic drag. In addition, the projectile might still require some form of on-board guidance and control to realize a useful orbital insertion angle that may not be achievable based simply on the launcher's upward elevation angle relative to the surface of the earth, (see practical considerations of escape velocity).

In 2003, Ian McNab outlined a plan to turn this idea into a realized technology. Because of strong acceleration, this system would launch only sturdy materials, such as food, water, and—most importantly—fuel. Under ideal circumstances (equator, mountain, heading east) the system would cost $528/kg, compared with $5,000/kg on the conventional rocket. The McNab railgun could make approximately 2000 launches per year, for a total of maximum 500 tons launched per year. Because the launch track would be 1.6 km long, power will be supplied by a distributed network of 100 rotating machines (compulsator) spread along the track. Each machine would have a 3.3-ton carbon fibre rotor spinning at high speeds. A machine can recharge in a matter of hours using 10 MW power. This machine could be supplied by a dedicated generator. The total launch package would weigh almost 1.4 tons. Payload per launch in these conditions is over 400 kg. There would be a peak operating magnetic field of 5 T—half of this coming from the rails, and the other half from augmenting magnets. This halves the required current through the rails, which reduces the power fourfold.

NASA has proposed to use a railgun to launch "wedge-shaped aircraft with scramjets" to high altitude at Mach 10, where it would then launch a small payload into orbit using conventional rocket propulsion. The extreme g-forces involved with direct railgun ground-launch to space may restrict the usage to only the sturdiest of payloads. Alternatively, very long rail systems may be used to reduce the required launch acceleration.

=== Weaponry ===
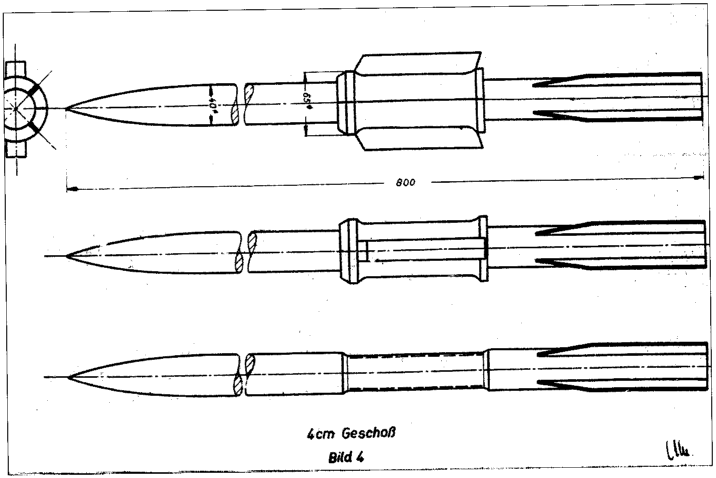
Drawings of electric gun projectiles

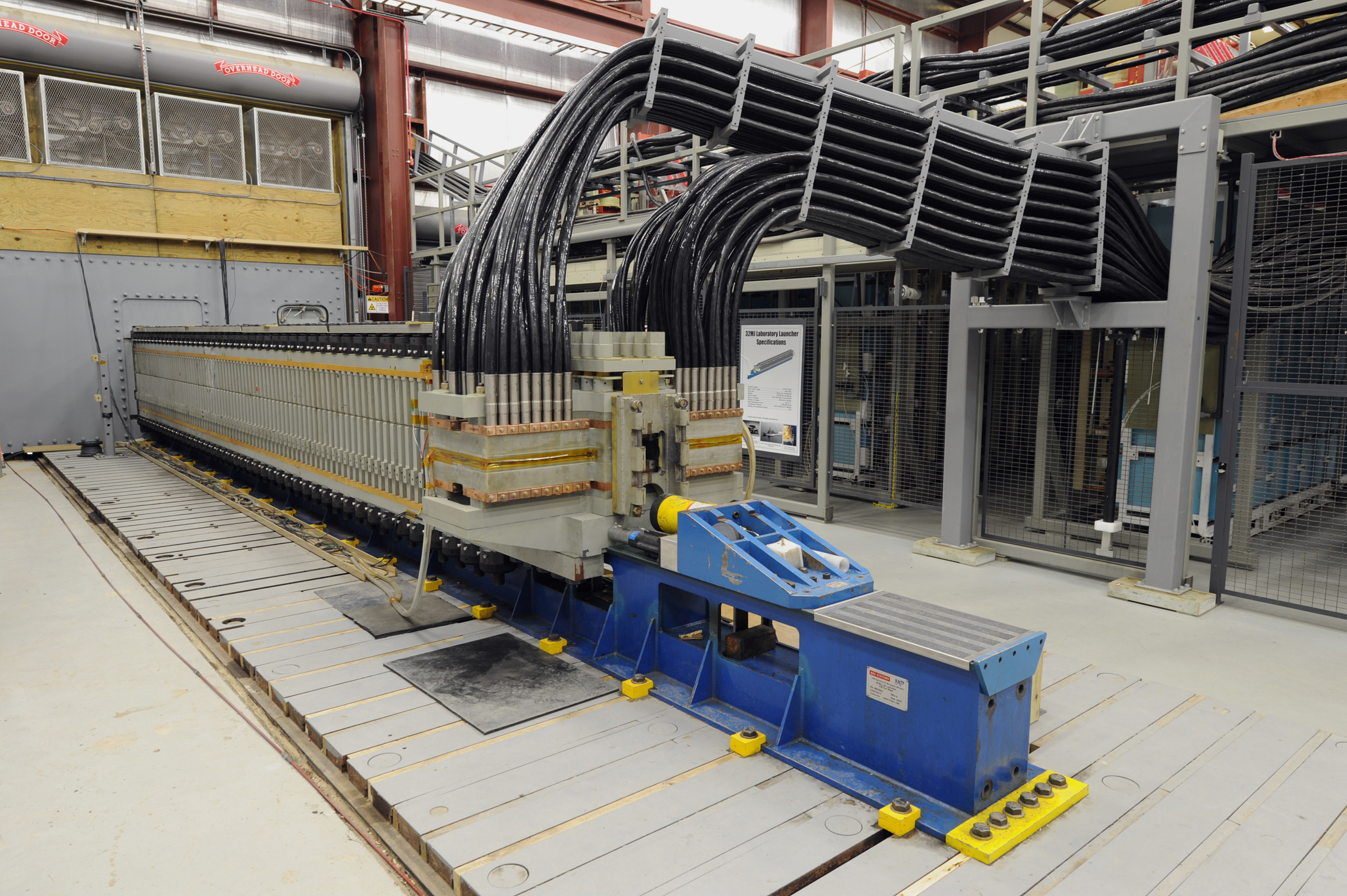
Electromagnetic railgun located at the Naval Surface Warfare Center

Railguns are being researched as weapons with projectiles that do not contain explosives or propellants, but are given extremely high velocities: 2,500 m/s (8,200 ft/s) (approximately Mach 7 at sea level) or more. For comparison, the M16 rifle has a muzzle speed of 930 m/s (3,050 ft/s), and the 16-inch/50-caliber Mark 7 gun that armed World War II American battleships has a muzzle speed of 760 m/s (2,490 ft/s), which because of its much greater projectile mass (up to 2,700 pounds) generated a muzzle energy of 360 MJ and a downrange kinetic impact of energy of over 160 MJ (see also Project HARP). By firing smaller projectiles at extremely high velocities, railguns may yield kinetic energy impacts equal or superior to the destructive energy of 5"/54 caliber Mark 45 Naval guns, (which achieve up to 10MJ at the muzzle), but with greater range. This decreases ammunition size and weight, allowing more ammunition to be carried and eliminating the hazards of carrying explosives or propellants in a tank or naval weapons platform. Also, by firing more aerodynamically streamlined projectiles at greater velocities, railguns may achieve greater range, less time to target, and at shorter ranges less wind drift, bypassing the physical limitations of conventional firearms: "the limits of gas expansion prohibit launching an unassisted projectile to velocities greater than about 1.5 km/s and ranges of more than 50 miles [80 km] from a practical conventional gun system."

The first weaponized railgun planned for production, the General Atomics Blitzer system, began full system testing in September 2010. The weapon launches a streamlined discarding sabot round designed by Boeing's Phantom Works at 1,600 m/s (5,200 ft/s) (approximately Mach 5) with accelerations exceeding 60,000 g_{n}. During one of the tests, the projectile was able to travel an additional 7 kilometres (4.3 mi) downrange after penetrating a 1/8 inch (3.2 mm) thick steel plate. The company hopes to have an integrated demo of the system by 2016 followed by production by 2019, pending funding. Thus far, the project is self-funded.

In October 2013, General Atomics unveiled a land based version of the Blitzer railgun. A company official claimed the gun could be ready for production in "two to three years".

Railguns are being examined for use as anti-aircraft weapons to intercept air threats, particularly anti-ship cruise missiles, in addition to land bombardment. The speed, cost, and numerical advantages of railgun systems may allow them to replace several different systems in the current layered defense approach. The Navy plans for railguns to be able to intercept endoatmospheric ballistic missiles, stealthy air threats, supersonic missiles, and swarming surface threats; a prototype system for supporting interception tasks is to be ready by 2018, and operational by 2025.

BAE Systems was at one point interested in installing railguns on their Future Fighting Vehicle.

India has successfully tested their own railgun. Russia, China, Turkey's ASELSAN and Yeteknoloji are also developing railguns.

Germany, France and Japan will jointly develop a railgun weapon.

In December 2025, U.S. president Donald Trump announced a new battleship class which could potentially be equipped with a railgun.

=== Helical railgun ===
Helical railguns are multi-turn railguns that reduce rail and brush current by a factor equal to the number of turns. Two rails are surrounded by a helical barrel and the projectile or re-usable carrier is also helical. The projectile is energized continuously by two brushes sliding along the rails, and two or more additional brushes on the projectile serve to energize and commute several windings of the helical barrel direction in front of and/or behind the projectile. The helical railgun is a cross between a railgun and a coilgun. They do not currently exist in a practical, usable form.

A helical railgun was built at MIT in 1980 and was powered by several banks of, for the time, large capacitors (approximately 4 farads). It was about 3 meters long, consisting of 2 meters of accelerating coil and 1 meter of decelerating coil. It was able to launch a glider or projectile about 500 meters.

=== Plasma railgun ===
A plasma railgun is a linear accelerator and a plasma energy weapon which, like a projectile railgun, uses two long parallel electrodes to accelerate a "sliding short" armature. However, in a plasma railgun, the armature and ejected projectile consists of plasma, or hot, ionized, gas-like particles, instead of a solid slug of material. MARAUDER (Magnetically Accelerated Ring to Achieve Ultra-high Directed Energy and Radiation) is, or was, a United States Air Force Research Laboratory project concerning the development of a coaxial plasma railgun. It is one of several United States Government efforts to develop plasma-based projectiles. The first computer simulations occurred in 1990, and its first published experiment appeared on 1 August 1993.

== Tests ==
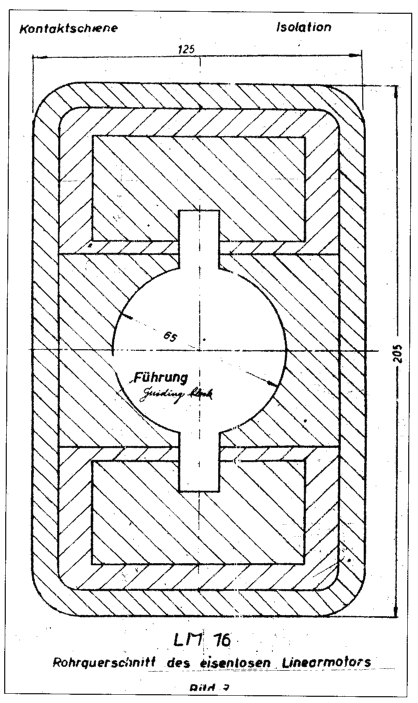
Diagram showing the cross-section of a linear motor cannon

Full-scale models have been built and fired, including a 90 mm (3.5 in) bore, 9 megajoule kinetic energy gun developed by the US DARPA. Rail and insulator wear problems still need to be solved before railguns can start to replace conventional weapons. Probably the oldest consistently successful system was built by the UK's Defence Research Agency at Dundrennan Range in Kirkcudbright, Scotland. This system was established in 1993 and has been operated for over 10 years.

China is now one of the major players in electromagnetic launchers; in 2012 it hosted the 16th International Symposium on Electromagnetic Launch Technology (EML 2012) at Beijing. Satellite imagery in late 2010 suggested that tests were being conducted at an armor and artillery range near Baotou, in the Inner Mongolia Autonomous Region.

=== United States Armed Forces ===
The United States military have expressed interest in pursuing research in electric gun technology throughout the late 20th century, since electromagnetic guns do not require propellants to fire a shot as conventional gun systems do, significantly increasing crew safety and reducing logistics costs, as well as provide a greater range. In addition, railgun systems have shown to potentially provide higher velocity of projectiles, which would increase accuracy for anti-tank, artillery, and air defense by decreasing the time it takes for the projectile to reach its target destination. During the early 1990s, the U.S. Army dedicated more than $150 million into electric gun research. At the University of Texas at Austin Center for Electromechanics, military railguns capable of delivering tungsten armor-piercing bullets with kinetic energies of nine megajoules (9 MJ) have been developed. Nine megajoules is enough energy to deliver 2 kg (4.4 lb) of projectile at 3 km/s (1.9 mi/s)—at that velocity, a sufficiently long rod of tungsten or another dense metal could easily penetrate a tank, and potentially pass through it, (see APFSDS).

==== Naval Surface Warfare Center Dahlgren Division ====
The United States Naval Surface Warfare Center Dahlgren Division demonstrated an 8 MJ railgun firing 3.2 kg (7.1 lb) projectiles in October 2006 as a prototype of a 64 MJ weapon to be deployed aboard Navy warships. The main problem the U.S. Navy has had with implementing a railgun cannon system is that the guns wear out because of the immense pressures, stresses and heat that are generated by the millions of amperes of current necessary to fire projectiles with megajoules of energy. While not nearly as powerful as a cruise missile like a BGM-109 Tomahawk, that will deliver 3,000 MJ of energy to a target, such weapons would, in theory, allow the Navy to deliver more granular firepower at a fraction of the cost of a missile, and will be much harder to shoot down versus future defensive systems. For context, another relevant comparison is the Rheinmetall 120mm gun used on main battle tanks, which generates 9 MJ of muzzle energy.

In 2007, BAE Systems delivered a 32 MJ prototype (muzzle energy) to the U.S. Navy. The same amount of energy is released by the detonation of 4.8 kg (11 lb) of C4.

On 31 January 2008, the U.S. Navy tested a railgun that fired a projectile at 10.64 MJ with a muzzle velocity of 2,520 m/s (8,270 ft/s). The power was provided by a new 9-megajoule prototype capacitor bank using solid-state switches and high-energy-density capacitors delivered in 2007 and an older 32-MJ pulse power system from the US Army's Green Farm Electric Gun Research and Development Facility developed in the late 1980s that was previously refurbished by General Atomics Electromagnetic Systems (EMS) Division. It is expected to be ready between 2020 and 2025.

A test of a railgun took place on 10 December 2010, by the U.S. Navy at the Naval Surface Warfare Center Dahlgren Division. During the test, the Office of Naval Research set a world record by conducting a 33 MJ shot from the railgun, which was built by BAE Systems.

Another test took place in February 2012, at the Naval Surface Warfare Center Dahlgren Division. While similar in energy to the aforementioned test, the railgun used was considerably more compact, with a more conventional looking barrel. A General Atomics-built prototype was delivered for testing in October 2012.

External videos
- Additional footage

In 2014, the U.S. Navy had plans to integrate a railgun that has a range of over 160 km (100 mi) onto a ship by 2016. This weapon, while having a form factor more typical of a naval gun, was to use components largely in common with those developed and demonstrated at Dahlgren. The hyper-velocity rounds weigh 10 kg (23 lb), are 18 in (460 mm), and are fired at Mach 7.

A future goal was to develop projectiles that were self-guided – a necessary requirement to hit distant targets or intercept missiles. When the guided rounds are developed, the Navy is projecting each round to cost about $25,000, though developing guided projectiles for guns has a history of doubling or tripling initial cost estimates. Some high velocity projectiles developed by the Navy have command guidance, but the accuracy of the command guidance is not known, nor even if it can survive a full power shot.

In 2014, the only U.S. Navy ships that could produce enough electrical power to get the desired performance were the three Zumwalt-class destroyers (DDG-1000 series); they can generate 78 megawatts of power, more than is necessary to power a railgun. However, the Zumwalt has been canceled and no further units will be built. Engineers are working to derive technologies developed for the DDG-1000 series ships into a battery system so other warships can operate a railgun. As of 2014 most destroyers can spare only nine megawatts of additional electricity, while it would require 25 megawatts to propel a projectile to the desired maximum range (i.e., to launch 32MJ projectiles at a rate of 10 shots per minute). Even if ships, such as the Arleigh Burke-class destroyer, can be upgraded with enough electrical power to operate a railgun, the space taken up on the ships by the integration of an additional weapon system may force the removal of existing weapon systems to make room available. The first shipboard tests was to be from a railgun installed on an Spearhead-class expeditionary fast transport (EPF), but this was later changed to land based testing.

Though the 23 lb projectiles have no explosives, their Mach 7 velocity gives them 32 megajoules of energy, but impact kinetic energy downrange will typically be 50 percent or less of the muzzle energy. The Navy looked into other uses for railguns, besides land bombardment, such as air defense; with the right targeting systems, projectiles could intercept aircraft, cruise missiles, and even ballistic missiles. The Navy is also developing directed-energy weapons for air defense use, but it will be years or decades before they will be effective.

The railgun would be part of a Navy fleet that envisions future offensive and defensive capabilities being provided in layers: lasers to provide close range defense, railguns to provide medium range attack and defense, and cruise missiles to provide long-range attack; though railguns will cover targets up to 100 miles away that previously needed a missile. The Navy may eventually enhance railgun technology to enable it to fire at a range of 200 nmi (230 mi; 370 km) and impact with 64 megajoules of energy. One shot would require 6 million amps of current, so it will take a long time to develop capacitors that can generate enough energy and strong enough gun materials.

The most promising near-term application for weapons-rated railguns and electromagnetic guns, in general, is probably aboard naval ships with sufficient spare electrical generating capacity and battery storage space. In exchange, ship survivability may be enhanced through a comparable reduction in the quantities of potentially dangerous chemical propellants and explosives employed. Ground combat forces, however, may find that co-locating an additional electrical power supply on the battlefield for every gun system may not be as weight and space efficient, survivable, or convenient a source of immediate projectile-launching energy as conventional propellants, which are manufactured safely behind the lines and delivered to the weapon, pre-packaged, through a robust and dispersed logistics system.

In July 2017, Defensetech reported that the Navy wished to push the Office of Naval Research's prototype railgun from a science experiment into useful weapon territory. The goal, according to Tom Beutner, head of Naval Air Warfare and Weapons for the ONR, was ten shots per minute at 32 megajoules. A 32 megajoule railgun shot is equivalent to about 23,600,000 foot-pounds, so a single 32 MJ shot has the same muzzle energy as about 200,000 .22 rounds being fired simultaneously. In more conventional power units, a 32 MJ shot every 6 s is a net power of 5.3 MW (or 5300 kW). If the railgun is assumed to be 20% efficient at turning electrical energy into kinetic energy, the ship's electrical supplies will need to provide about 25 MW for as long as firing continues.

As of 2020, the Navy had spent $500m on rail gun development over 17 years. The Navy was focusing on firing hypersonic projectiles from existing conventional guns already available in numbers. On 1 June 2021, The Drive reported that the US navy's proposed 2022 fiscal year budget had no funding for railgun research and development. Technical challenges could not be overcome, such as the massive forces of firing wearing out the barrel after only one or two dozen shots, and a rate of fire too low to be useful for missile defense. Priorities had also changed since railgun development started, with the Navy putting more focus on longer range hypersonic missiles compared to comparatively shorter range railgun projectiles.

==== Army Research Laboratory ====
Research on railgun technology served as a major area of focus at the Ballistic Research Laboratory (BRL) throughout the 1980s. In addition to analyzing the performance and electrodynamic and thermodynamic properties of railguns at other institutions (like Maxwell Laboratories' CHECMATE railgun), BRL procured their own railguns for study such as their one-meter railgun and their four-meter rail gun. In 1984, BRL researchers devised a technique to analyze the residue left behind on the bore surface after a shot was fired in order to investigate the cause of the bore's progressive degradation. In 1991, they determined the properties required for developing an effective launch package as well as the design criteria necessary for a railgun to incorporate finned, long rod projectiles.

Research into railguns continued after the Ballistic Research Laboratory was consolidated with six other independent Army laboratories to form the U.S. Army Research Laboratory (ARL) in 1992. One of the major projects in railgun research that ARL was involved in was the Cannon-Caliber Electromagnetic Gun (CCEMG) program, which took place at the Center for Electromechanics at the University of Texas (UT-CEM) and was sponsored by the U.S. Marine Corps and the U.S. Army Armament Research Development and Engineering Center. As part of the CCEMG program, UT-CEM designed and developed the Cannon-Caliber Electromagnetic Launcher, a rapid-fire railgun launcher, in 1995. Featuring a 30-mm roundbore, the launcher was capable of firing three, five-round salvos of 185-g launch packages at a muzzle velocity of 1850 m/s and a firing rate of 5 Hz. Rapid-fire operation was achieved by driving the launcher with multiple 83544 peak pulses provided by the CCEMG compulsator. The CCEMG railgun included several features: ceramic sidewalls, directional preloading, and liquid cooling. ARL was responsible for assessing the performance of the launcher, which was tested at the ARL Transonic Experimental Facility in Aberdeen Proving Ground, Maryland.

The U.S. Army Research Laboratory also monitored electromagnetic and electrothermal gun technology development at the Institute for Advanced Technology (IAT) at the University of Texas at Austin, one of five university and industry laboratories that ARL federated to procure technical support. It housed the two electromagnetic launchers, the Leander OAT and the AugOAT, as well as the Medium Caliber Launcher. The facility also provided a power system that included thirteen 1- MJ capacitor banks, an assortment of electromagnetic launcher devices and diagnostic apparatuses. The focus of the research activity was on designs, interactions and materials required for electromagnetic launchers.

In 1999, a collaboration between ARL and IAT led to the development of a radiometric method of measuring the temperature distribution of railgun armatures during a pulsed electrical discharge without disturbing the magnetic field. In 2001, ARL became the first to obtain a set of accuracy data on electromagnetic gun-launched projectiles using jump tests. In 2004, ARL researchers published papers examining the interaction of high temperature plasmas for the purpose of developing efficient railgun igniters. Early papers describe the plasma-propellant interaction group at ARL and their attempts to understand and distinguish between the chemical, thermal, and radiation effect of plasmas on conventional solid propellants. Using scanning electron microscopy and other diagnostic techniques, they evaluated in detail the influence of plasmas on specific propellant materials.

=== People's Republic of China ===
China is developing its own railgun system. According to a CNBC report from U.S. intelligence, China's railgun system was first revealed in 2011, and ground testing began in 2014. Between 2015 and 2017, the weapon system gained the ability to strike over extended ranges with increased lethality. The weapon system was successfully mounted on a Chinese Navy ship in December 2017, with sea trials happening later.

In early February 2018, pictures of what is claimed to be a Chinese railgun were published online. In the pictures the gun is mounted on the bow of a Type 072III-class landing ship Haiyangshan. Media suggests that the system is or soon will be ready for testing. In March 2018, it was reported that China confirmed it had begun testing its electromagnetic rail gun at sea.

=== India ===
In November 2017, India's Defence Research and Development Organisation carried out a successful test of a 12 mm square bore electromagnetic railgun. Tests of a 30 mm version are planned to be conducted. India aims to fire a one kilogram projectile at a velocity of more than 2,000 m/s using a capacitor bank of 10 megajoules. Electromagnetic guns and directed energy weapons are among the systems which the Indian Navy aims to acquire in its modernisation plan up to 2030.

=== Japan ===
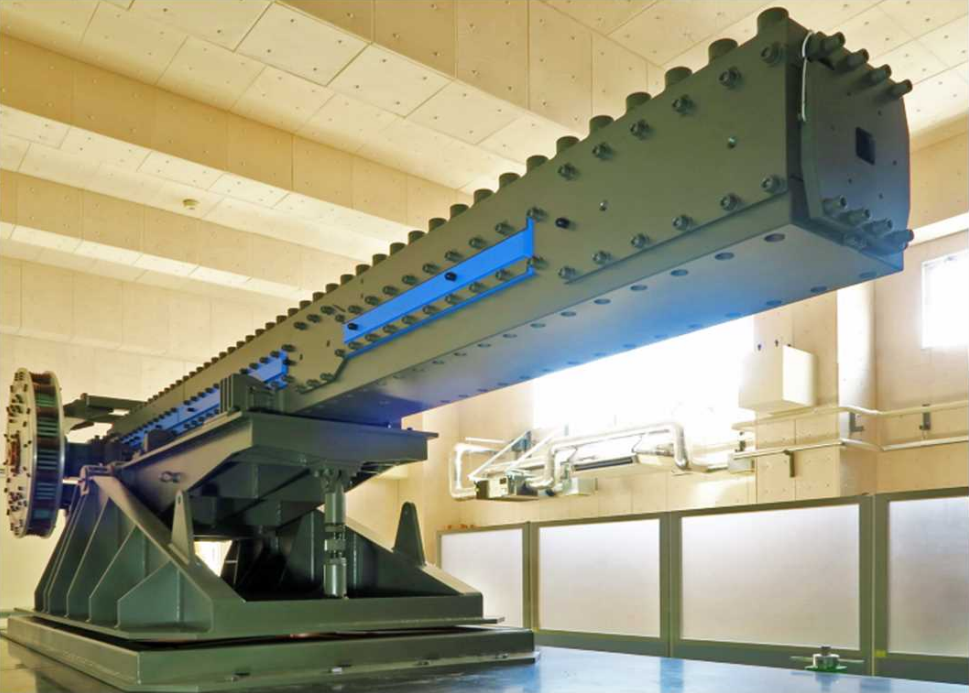
ATLA 40mm railgun

The Japanese Ministry of Defense started its survey on railgun-related technology domestically and internationally by 2015, while conducting basic research using a small caliber railgun with a 16mm bore.

By 2016, the government of Japan had concluded that technological cooperation with the U.S. was necessary for deployment of railguns, and such cooperation would require technological know-how on the Japanese side. Therefore, full-scale development began in that year. From FY2016 to FY2022, research on electromagnetic acceleration systems was conducted and the target was set to increase the projectile's initial velocity and improve the rail's durability on a single-shot-type 40mm caliber railgun. Test results published later showed that the railgun had a stable initial velocity of over 2000 m/s during 120 rounds of repeated fire, which was the target velocity. The railgun also had presented no significant damage on the rail near the starting position of the projectile, whereas previous studies have shown significant erosion, confirming the reduction in rail damage. The test used a single 20-ft cargo container that served as a charger and a 5 MJ-capacity capacitor consisting of three 20-ft cargo containers to fire two types of projectiles (total length about 160 mm, mass about 320 g): a separated projectile (分離弾), which would be similar to actual use and has armor piercing in mind, and an integrated projectile (一体弾), which was simplifed from the separated projectile to reduce cost. The gun is about 6 meters long and has the mass of 8 tons.

In the Preliminary Project Evaluation for fiscal year 2021, published by the MoD in September 2, 2022, it was announced that it will conduct research on railguns from FY2022 to FY2026. The research is aimed at "future railguns capable of firing hypersonic projectiles with a high fire rate to counter threats such as hypersonic missiles". Specifically, research on mechanism for continuous fires, flight stability outside the barrel, fire control and damage of the railgun had been mentioned as points of interest.

On October 17, 2023, the Acquisition, Technology & Logistics Agency (ATLA) announced on its official X account that they had "accomplished ship-board firing test of railgun first time in the world" (sic) with video footage of a railgun firing rounds into the ocean from a vessel. The JMSDF's Self Defense Fleet had later hinted in a press release the involvement of the JS Asuka in the ship-board firing test.

== Issues ==
=== Major difficulties ===
Major technological and operational hurdles must be overcome before railguns can be deployed:

1. Railgun durability: To date, public railgun demonstrations have not shown an ability to fire multiple full power shots from the same set of rails. However, the United States Navy has claimed hundreds of shots from the same set of rails. In a March 2014 statement to the Intelligence, Emerging Threats and Capabilities Subcommittee of the House Armed Services Committee, then-Chief of Naval Research Rear Admiral Matthew Klunder stated, "Barrel life has increased from tens of shots to over 400, with a program path to achieve 1000 shots." However, the Office of Naval Research (ONR) will not confirm that the 400 shots are full-power shots. Further, there is nothing published to indicate there are any high megajoule-class railguns with the capability of firing hundreds of full-power shots while staying within the strict operational parameters necessary to fire railgun shots accurately and safely. Railguns should be able to fire 6 rounds per minute with a rail life of about 3000 rounds, tolerating launch accelerations of tens of thousands of gees, extreme pressures and megaampere currents, but this is not feasible with current technology.
2. Projectile guidance: A future capability critical to fielding a real railgun weapon is developing a robust guidance package that will allow the railgun to fire at distant targets or to hit incoming missiles. Developing such a package is a significant challenge. The U.S. Navy's RFP Navy SBIR 2012.1 – Topic N121-102 for developing such a package gives a good overview of just how challenging railgun projectile guidance is:
  The package must fit within the mass (< 2 kg), diameter (< 40 mm outer diameter), and volume (200 cm^{3}) constraints of the projectile and do so without altering the center of gravity. It should also be able to survive accelerations of at least 20,000 g (threshold) / 40,000 g (objective) in all axes, high electromagnetic fields (E > 5,000 V/m, B > 2 T), and surface temperatures of > 800 deg C. The package should be able to operate in the presence of any plasma that may form in the bore or at the muzzle exit and must also be radiation hardened owing to exo-atmospheric flight. Total power consumption must be less than 8 watts (threshold)/5 watts (objective) and the battery life must be at least 5 minutes (from initial launch) to enable operation during the entire engagement. In order to be affordable, the production cost per projectile must be as low as possible, with a goal of less than $1,000 per unit.

On 22 June 2015, General Atomics' Electromagnetic Systems announced that projectiles with on-board electronics survived the whole railgun launch environment and performed their intended functions in four consecutive tests on 9 and 10 June at the U.S. Army's Dugway Proving Ground in Utah. The on-board electronics successfully measured in-bore accelerations and projectile dynamics, for several kilometers downrange which is essential for precision guidance. The integral data link even continued to operate after the projectiles impacted the desert floor.

== See also ==
- Ram accelerator
- Project Babylon
- Non-rocket spacelaunch
- Electrothermal-chemical technology
- Plasma railgun
- Coilgun
- Kinetic bombardment
- V-3 cannon: another staged propulsion gun
- USNS Trenton (T-EPF-5), first ship to mount a railgun.
- Teleforce, a similar device devised by Nikola Tesla which involved using projectiles accelerated to high velocities via electrostatic repulsion
