= Plasma railgun =

Linear accelerator

A plasma railgun is a linear accelerator which, like a projectile railgun, uses two long parallel electrodes to accelerate a "sliding short" armature. However, in a plasma railgun, the armature and ejected projectile consists of plasma, or hot, ionized particles in a gas-like state, instead of a solid slug of material. Scientific plasma railguns are typically operated in vacuum and not at air pressure. They are of value because they produce muzzle velocities of up to several hundreds of kilometers per second. Because of this, these devices have applications in magnetic confinement fusion (MCF), magneto-inertial fusion (MIF), high energy density physics research (HEDP), laboratory astrophysics, and as a plasma propulsion engine for spacecraft.

== Theory ==
Plasma railguns appear in two principal topologies, linear and coaxial. Linear railguns consist of two flat plate electrodes separated by insulating spacers and accelerate sheet armatures. Coaxial railguns accelerate toroidal plasma armatures using a hollow outer conductor and a central, concentric, inner conductor.

Linear plasma railguns place extreme demands on their insulators, as they must be an electrically insulating, plasma-facing vacuum component which can withstand both thermal and acoustic shocks. Additionally, a complex triple joint seal may exist at the breech of the bore, which can often pose an extreme engineering challenge. Coaxial accelerators require insulators only at the breech, but the plasma armature in that case is subject to the "blow-by" instability. This is an instability in which the magnetic pressure front can out-run or "blow-by" the plasma armature due to the radial dependence of acceleration current density, drastically reducing device efficiency. Coaxial accelerators use various techniques to mitigate this instability. In either design, a plasma armature is formed at the breech. As plasma railguns are an open area of research, the method of armature formation varies. However, techniques including exploding foils, gas cell burst disk injection, neutral gas injection via fast gas valve, and plasma capillary injection have been employed.

After armature formation, the plasmoid is then accelerated down the length of the railgun by a current pulse driven through one electrode, through the armature, and out the other electrode, creating a large magnetic field behind the armature. Since the driver current through the armature is also moving through and normal to a self-generated magnetic field, the armature particles experience a Lorentz force, accelerating them down the length of the gun. Accelerator electrode geometry and materials are also open areas of research.

== Applications ==
Controlled jets from plasma rail guns can have peak densities in the 10^{13} to 10^{16} particles/m^{3} range, and velocities from 5 to 200 km/s, depending on device design configuration and operating parameters, and the upper limits may be higher. Plasma rail guns are being evaluated for applications in magnetic confinement fusion for disruption mitigation and tokamak refueling.

Magneto-inertial fusion seeks to implode a magnetized D-T fusion target using a spherically symmetric, collapsing, conducting liner. Plasma railguns are being evaluated as a possible method of implosion linear formation for fusion.

Arrays of plasma railguns could be used to create pulsed implosions of ~1 Megabar peak pressure, allowing more access to chart this opening area of plasma physics.

High velocity jets of controllable density and temperature allow astrophysical phenomena such as solar wind, galactic jets, solar events and astrophysical plasma to be partially simulated in the laboratory and measured directly, in addition to astronomic and satellite observations.

== Examples ==
Device	Institution
Marshal gun	Los Alamos National Laboratory
Compact Toroid Accelerator (CTA)	
MARAUDER	Kirtland Air Force Base
RACE	Lawrence Livermore National Lab
Compact Toroid Injection Experiment (CTIX)	University of California, Davis
Compact torus accelerator (CTA)	Lawrence Livermore National Laboratory
Compact Torus Injector	University of Saskatchewan, Canada
Compact Torus Injector (HIT-CTI)	Himeji Institute of Technology, Japan
Pulsed High Density Fusion Experiment (PHD)	University of Washington
Fusion Plasma Injector	General Fusion, Canada
Linear and coaxial railguns	HyperJet Fusion Corp., USA
Linear and coaxial railguns	NearStar Fusion Inc., USA

== See also ==
- Helical railgun
- Coilgun
- Mass driver
- Ram accelerator
- Light-gas gun
- Pulsed plasma thruster
- MARAUDER
- Combustion light-gas gun
