= Cannon-Caliber Electromagnetic Gun launcher =

Rapid-fire railgun launcher

The Cannon-Caliber Electromagnetic Gun (CCEMG) launcher is a rapid-fire railgun launcher developed by the U.S. military in the early 1990s to study and test the viability of electromagnetic weapons.

== Description ==
The CCEMG launcher (version III) was a series augmented railgun capable of firing three five-round salvos of 185-g launch packages at a velocity of 1,850 m/s with a firing rate of 5 Hz. It was a 2.25 m long, water-glycol cooled launcher with a 30 mm rectangular bore and achieved rapid fire operation with the help of a CCEMG compulsator that provided multiple 835 kA peak pulses. The CCEMG launcher had an overall mass of only 273 kg despite its solid armature and its structurally stiff makeup, which resulted from incorporating a directional preloading mechanism, ceramic sidewalls, and a composite overwrap in its design. The performance of the CCEMG launcher relied on the system's directional preloading mechanism, called “flatjacks,” which were located between the main and augmenting rails of the railgun. The flatjacks countered the electromagnetic loading and applied pressure to the main rails so that the ceramic sidewalls (made of AD-96 alumina) remained in compression throughout the discharge. They were required to be pressurized to 138 MPa for a full current shot and had to endure a displacement of about 1.3 mm. The filament-wound composite overwrap, composed of 82 percent graphite fibers and 18 percent fiberglass, reacted the preload and provided stiffness to the launcher in the axial direction. The rails were made out of chromium copper due to its strength (310 MPa yield), conductivity (82 percent IACS), relatively low cost, and dimensional stability. The main rails were slit transverse to the launcher's axis to the midpoint of the ceramic wall in order to achieve a breech efficiency (kinetic energy of the armature divided by the energy delivered to the breech of the gun) of 50 percent.

== Properties ==
The following tables display the parameters for the CCEMG launcher:

CCEMG launcher physical properties
| Railgun type | Series augmented |
| Bore dimensions (cm) | 1.73 x 2.73 |
| Overall length (m) | 2.25 |
| Augmented length (m) | 1.85 |
| Stiffness at peak current | 0.2% deflection |
| Coolant | Water-ethylene glycol |
| Weight (kg) | 273 |

CCEMG launcher performance
| Launch package mass (g) | 180 |
| Muzzle velocity (m/s) | 1,850 |
| Peak current (kA) | 835 |
| Number of salvos | 3 |
| Rounds per salvo | 5 |
| Firing rate (Hz) | 5 |
| Time between salvos (s) | 2.5 |

== Development ==
The CCEMG launcher was developed in the early 1990s as part of the Cannon-Caliber Electromagnetic Gun (CCEMG) Program to demonstrate the viability of an electromagnetic multi-shot weapon. The CCEMG program was sponsored by the U.S. Army Armament Research, Development, and Engineering Center and the U.S. Marine Corps. As part of the project, the Center for Electromechanics at the University of Texas at Austin (UT-CEM) was commissioned to construct the launcher as well as provide the pulsed power supply and armature development, while the Kaman Science Corporation was tasked with developing the Integrated Launch Package (ILP) for the railgun. In order to design the CCEMG launcher, an optimization algorithm called EXCaliber (short for Electromagnetic eXperimental Caliber) was developed to take into account details surrounding armature and barrel structural and thermal design requirements as well as analyze the impact of different launch environment conditions on power supply size and mass. The equations governing armature and barrel design were coded into a FORTRAN program structure, and the thermal and structural design constraints for both the armature and barrel were interdependently modeled. EXCaliber was used to calculate the minimum armature and barrel bass as well as the minimum required gun breech energy demands. Based on these calculations, the optimization algorithm determined that the minimum breech energy demand occurred at 1.85 km/s launch velocity and that the breech energy demand for one-turn (simple rail) designs increased at a higher rate than two- or three-turn (augmented) designs as launch velocity increased. The results from EXCaliber also concluded that a rectangular bore cross-section provided a higher launch efficiency than a round-bore design.

In designing the CCEMG launcher, UT-CEM and the Kaman Science Corporation were given a specific set of requirements that the launcher had to meet. (See table below)

CCEMG Statement of Work (SOW) Requirements
| Armor penetration at 56 degrees obliquity | 131 mm RHA at 1.5 km; 66 mm RHA at 3 km |
| Caliber | 20 to 40 mm |
| Firing rate | 300 to 400 rounds per minute |
| Salvo size | 5 to 7 rounds |
| Time between salvos | 2 to 2.5 seconds |
| Probability of hit | 90% |
| System weight | 5,000 lb (2,286 kg) maximum |
| Weapon platform | Compatible with Amphibious Assault Vehicle |

In order to fulfill these target specifications, several design choices were made to the CCEMG to optimize its performance. The CCEMG armature, which had to carry the accelerating current and distribute the accelerating force to the sub-projectile, was designed to be discarded after launch and made contact with the rail at two distinct places. The launch package was also calculated by EXCaliber to have a total mass of 180 grams, which was evenly split between the armature and the sub-projectile. Other design choices included the incorporation of ceramic sidewalls, internal preloading, and chromium copper rails. For the ILP, the Kaman Science Corporation designed the launch package to operate at a launch velocity of 1,850 m/s to meet the penetration at range requirement, resulting in a peak axial acceleration of 2.06 million m/s^{2} or 210,000 g. The pulsed power supply (PPS) for the CCEMG launcher was composed of eight banks, each of which was nominally 200 kJ at a rated maximum charge voltage of 10 kV. As the CCEMG launcher's power supply, the air-core compulsator weighed 2,045 kg and stored 40 MJ at 12,000 rpm. At the conclusion of the CCEMG program's development process, two single-shot railguns (known as CCEMG launchers IIA and IIB) and a water-glycol cooled, rapid-fire railgun (CCEMG launcher III) were built. The only listed difference between launchers IIA and IIB from launcher III was that launcher III possessed coolant passages to cool the rail sets between salvos and a deceleration guide required for autoloading.

== Tests ==
=== Launcher IIA testing ===
Preliminary testing of the CCEMG launcher IIA took place at UT-CEM and at the U.S. Army Research Laboratory (ARL) from 1994 to 1995. The primary purpose of the experimental test was to verify the performance of the single-shot launcher and the ILP to determine whether they met the CCEMG system requirements. Improvements and modifications to the launcher and ILP were made during various phases of testing.

Summary of launcher IIA testing
| Shot Number | CEM 7 | CEM 11 | ARL 7 | ARL 14 | ARL 16 | ARL 34 | ARL 37 | ARL 38 | ARL 39 |
|---|---|---|---|---|---|---|---|---|---|
| Date | 3/1/94 | 3/14/94 | 8/31/94 | 9/28/94 | 10/21/94 | 6/1/95 | 8/15/95 | 8/16/95 | 8/17/95 |
PPS parameters
| CPA speed (rpm) | 3774 | 3837 | NA | NA | NA | NA | NA | NA | NA |
| Field excitation (A) | 1489 | 1500 | NA | NA | NA | NA | NA | NA | NA |
| Peak voltage (V) | 1638 | 1612 | 8500 | 8400 | 9200 | 7400 | 7800 | 8600 | 9100 |
| CPA volts (V) | 110 | 220 | NA | NA | NA | NA | NA | NA | NA |
| Firing angle (degrees) | 5.84 | 5.00 | NA | NA | NA | NA | NA | NA | NA |
| Peak current (kA) | 552 | 462 | 609 | 586 | 667* | 639 | 666 | 716 | 766 |
| Pulse width (ms) | 4.1 | 4.1 | 1.9 | 2.2 | 1.9* | 2.6 | 2.3 | 2.1 | 2.0 |
| Time to peak (ms) | 1.9 | 1.9 | 0.38 | 0.38 | 0.38* | 0.47 | 0.46 | 0.46 | 0.46 |
Launcher/ILP parameters
| Velocity (m/s) | 1339 | 1350 | 1886 | 1369 | 1492 | 1350 | 1492 | 1639 | 1785 |
| ILP mass (kg) | 0.186 | 0.098 | 0.174 | 0.178 | 0.180 | 0.180 | 0.180 | 0.180 | 0.180 |
| Breech efficiency (%) | 51 | 30 | 37 | 42 | 42* | 37 | 39.1 | 39.8 | 44.6 |
| Armature insertion force (kN) | 11.6 | 5.98 | 2.79 | 5.89 | 7.57 | 5.58 | 5.57 | 5.57 | 5.57 |
| Armature current at exit (kA) | 123 | 94 | 294 | 263 | 300* | 132 | 146 | 134 | 384 |
| Action at exit (MA^{2}s) | 515 | 355 | 367 | 436 | 511 | 468 | 500 | 527 | 642 |
| Flatjack pressure (MPa) | 103 | 96 | 96 | 93 | 96 | 96* | 110 | 110 | 128 |
Note: *estimated

==== CEM-UT testing ====
The CCEMG launcher IIA fired a total of 11 shots at UT-CEM. The launcher was powered with a 1 MJ/pulse iron core compulsator, and the shots were fired with a gradual increase in system energy. The deviation of the bore centerline was measured before and after flatjack pressurization prior to electrical testing in order to determine whether the flatjacks had an effect on bore straightness, which indicated the integrity of the adhesive bonds between the rails and the sidewall as well as the symmetry of the structural preload. The bore straightness changed very little even after the 11th shot, deviating from a straight line by at most 0.2 mm, suggesting that either a uniform amount of axial strain was being applied to the structure or that the flatjack axial strains had minimal effect on the structure. Launcher IIA demonstrated its highest performance on shot 7, which had a peak current of 552 kA. During the last shot, testers found an insulation flaw within the launcher. As a result, modifications were made to the electrical insulation design of launchers IIB and III, such as the thickening of the mica insulation, the addition of a composite insulating barrier between the flatjack manifold region and the augmenting rails, and the incorporation of an additional fiberglass layer to the bore of the composite overwrap.

==== ARL testing ====
The ARL testing of the CCEMG launcher IIA took place at the EM Facility at the Transonic Range in Aberdeen Proving Ground (APG), MD. The launcher was powered by a 1.55 MJ capacitor-based pulsed power supply composed of eight banks, each of which could be charged to different initial voltages and be triggered independently in time. Throughout testing, muzzle velocity was measured using various techniques, such as by recording the time rate of change of the armature's in-bore induction field. Other methods included the use of a smear camera, flash x-ray, and radar. Radar was also used to evaluate the subprojectile velocity degradation that occurred over the flight range. Fifteen yaw cards that served as cardboard targets were used to assess the free-flight aerodynamics of the projectile launched from the railgun.

The launcher fired a total of 39 shots at APG, where shots 1 to 9 focused on component characterization, shots 10 to 16 focused on armature development, shots 17 to 27 focused on launch dynamics, shots 28 to 32 focused on pseudo multishot capabilities, and shots 33 to 39 focused on peak performance. Shots 28 to 32 were fired without bore maintenance between the five consecutive shots to gauge the eventual multishot operation of the CCEMG launcher. During shots 33 to 39, launcher IIA was subjected to maximum stress levels by increasing the initial capacitor charge voltage and the resultant peak current delivered to the launcher. Consequently, shot 39 demonstrated the highest performance with a peak current of 766 kA as well as the highest muzzle current at 384 kA. However, since the launcher was not designed to withstand this level of force at the muzzle, substantial structural deformation and rail wear at the muzzle were observed afterwards. At the conclusion of the test, it was determined that launcher IIA was rendered unusable due to the resulting damage, and the remaining flatjack was pressurized to failure to determine its upper design limit. The flatjack reached a pressure ceiling of 30 ksi without failure, but the pressurization stopped shortly afterwards to prevent damage to the augmenting rails, which was salvaged for reuse. Upon the disassembly of launcher IIA, several cracks in the sidewalls were observed, likely due to stress concentration. However, the rail bonds and the aluminum-coated rail bore surfaces sustained very little damage.

=== Launcher III testing ===
The performance test of the CCEMG launcher III was conducted by CEM-UT in 1996. Despite being a multishot system, launcher III underwent only single-shot testing during this evaluation for the purposes of verifying the accuracy of the computer simulation, establishing the reliability of the control system, and determining the necessary parameters for the pulse power system. Multishot testing took place with incremental increases in system energy in subsequent tests. A total of six single shots were fired for this trial, of which the sixth shot demonstrated the highest muzzle energy with 279 kJ. The results showed no damage to the rail or sidewall of the launcher with the exception of minor arc erosion caused by the last shot.

Summary of launcher III testing
| Shot number | 3 | 4 | 5 | 6 |
|---|---|---|---|---|
| Date | 1/24/96 | 2/5/96 | 2/7/96 | 2/9/96 |
Power supply parameters
| Field amps (kA) | 22.0 | 27.4 | 27.4 | 30.5 |
| Field rise time (s) | 0.192 | 0.195 | 0.195 | 0.160 |
| Peak AC volts (V) | 1,910 | 2,510 | 2,485 | 2,835 |
| Fire angle (degree) | 5 | 5 | 5 | 5 |
| Peak gun current (kA) | 496 | 599 | 605 | 660 |
| Pulse width (ms) | 3.30 | 2.97 | 2.97 | 2.97 |
Launcher/Armature parameters
| Primary flatjack pressure (ksi) | 10.0 | 13.0 | 13.0 | 15.0 |
| ILP mass (g) | 135.3 | 148.4 | 163.3 | 154.5 |
| Load force (lbf) | 3,100 | 3,200 | 3,360 | 3,136 |
| ILP muzzle velocity (m/s) | 1,187 | 1,729 | 1,530 | 1,900 |
| Muzzle energy (kJ) | 95.3 | 222 | 191 | 279 |
| Muzzle current (kA) | 0.0 | 125 | 68 | 212 |
| Breech efficiency (%) | 44 | 53 | 49 | 49 |

=== Follow-up experiments ===
In 1999, researchers at ARL conducted a series of experiments on the CCEMG launcher at the Transonic Experimental Facility at Aberdeen to investigate the effects of electromagnetism on the sabot discard process and on the subprojectile during launch.
