= Dundrennan =

Village in Scotland

Coordinates: 54.808°N 3.948°W

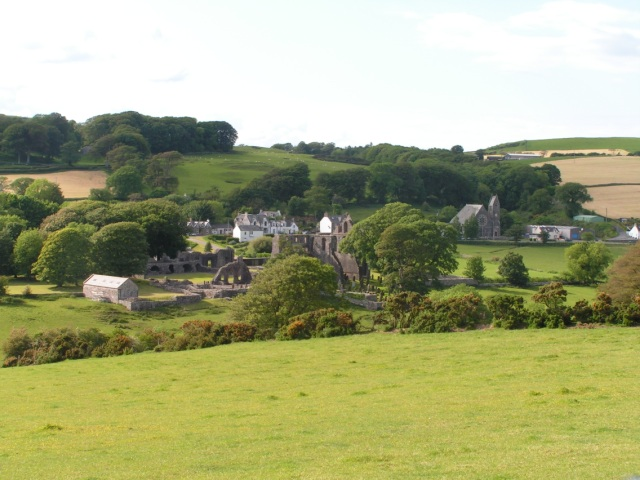

- Location within Dumfries and Galloway
- OS grid reference: NX 7495 4775
- Civil parish: Rerrick
- Council area: Dumfries and Galloway
- Lieutenancy area: Kirkcudbrightshire
- Country: Scotland
- Sovereign state: United Kingdom
- Post town: KIRKCUDBRIGHT
- Postcode district: DG6
- Dialling code: 01557
- Police: Scotland
- Fire: Scottish
- Ambulance: Scottish

Dundrennan (Gaelic: Dun Droighnein) is a village in Dumfries and Galloway, Scotland, about 5 miles (8 km) east of Kirkcudbright. Its population is around 230. Dundrennan is located in the civil parish of Rerrick in the historic county of Kirkcudbrightshire. It is most notable for the ruins of Dundrennan Abbey, a 12th-century Cistercian monastery. The weapons testing establishment Dundrennan Range is also nearby.

From 2001 until 2015 the Wickerman music festival was held on the nearby farm of East Kirkcarswell.

Dundrennan is a Gaelic name meaning 'hill of thorns' from the words dùn 'fortified place, hill' and droigheann 'blackthorn, bramble'. It is recorded in c.1160 as Dundrainan.

== Dundrennan Air Crash ==
On 18 July 1944 at 12:15am, on a night training exercise from RAF Carlisle, Crosby-on-Eden, an RAF Beaufighter crashed into a house in the main street. Four members of the Hamilton family died along with the two airmen.

Their names are.

James Hamilton aged 35 and his wife Georgina aged 33, their children Henry aged 10 and Agnes aged 8.

(Daughter Georgina aged 12 survived.)

Also the 2 airmen who died in the crash.

F/S Henry Wiles (RAFVR) Aged 21 from Aldershot, buried at Aldershot Civilian Cemetery.

Sgt. Eric Young (RAFVR) Aged 21 from Huddersfield, plaque at Leeds Lawns Wood Crematorium.

- grid reference NX748476

== Climate ==
Dundrennan has an oceanic climate (Köppen: Cfb).

Climate data for Dundrennan (1991–2020)
Month	Jan	Feb	Mar	Apr	May	Jun	Jul	Aug	Sep	Oct	Nov	Dec	Year
Mean daily maximum °C (°F)	6.4 (43.5)	6.7 (44.1)	8.3 (46.9)	10.8 (51.4)	13.9 (57.0)	16.2 (61.2)	17.9 (64.2)	17.7 (63.9)	15.7 (60.3)	12.5 (54.5)	9.3 (48.7)	7.0 (44.6)	11.9 (53.4)
Mean daily minimum °C (°F)	2.3 (36.1)	2.2 (36.0)	3.0 (37.4)	4.6 (40.3)	7.0 (44.6)	9.8 (49.6)	11.7 (53.1)	11.7 (53.1)	10.2 (50.4)	7.5 (45.5)	4.9 (40.8)	2.8 (37.0)	6.5 (43.7)
Average rainfall mm (inches)	114.9 (4.52)	91.3 (3.59)	88.5 (3.48)	72.2 (2.84)	69.7 (2.74)	81.5 (3.21)	89.5 (3.52)	110.2 (4.34)	100.3 (3.95)	135.7 (5.34)	126.6 (4.98)	126.6 (4.98)	1,206.8 (47.51)
Average rainy days (≥ 1 mm)	15.8	13.5	12.9	12.5	10.9	10.9	12.7	14.0	12.6	15.4	16.1	15.6	162.9
Source: Met Office

== See also ==
- List of places in Dumfries and Galloway
