= Chinese landing ship Haiyang Shan =

History

China
- Name: Haiyang Shan (936); (Chinese: 海洋山)
- Namesake: Haiyang Mountains

General characteristics
- Type: Type 072III landing ship
- Displacement: 7,000 tonnes
- Length: 119.5 m (392 ft)
- Beam: 16.4 m (54 ft)
- Draft: 2.8 m (9 ft 2 in)
- Installed power: 2 × 12PA6V-280MPC diesel at 7,080 kW (9,490 hp)
- Speed: 18 knots (33 km/h; 21 mph)
- Range: 3,000 nmi (5,600 km; 3,500 mi) at 14 knots (26 km/h; 16 mph)
- Capacity: 10 × tanks or; 500 tons of cargo or; 250 fully equipped troops
- Complement: 104
- Armament: 3 × H/PJ76F twin 37mm 1 x electromagnetic railgun
- Aviation facilities: helicopter platform

Haiyang Shan is a Type 072III-class landing ship of the East Sea Fleet of the People's Liberation Army Navy.

== History ==
According to images that began circulating in January 2018, the Haiyang Shan appears to be the first ship to have an electromagnetic railgun installed aboard it. Although operational capabilities are not confirmed, the weapon is located at the bow of the ship with support or power modules installed on the deck.
