= Linus (fusion experiment) =

Experimental fusion power project

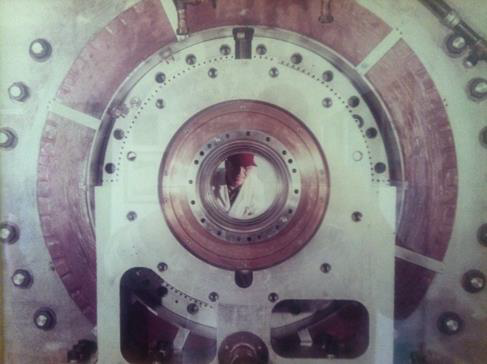
A technician looks through the center of the NRL Linus-0 reactor

The Linus program (Note: Named for the Peanuts character.) was an experimental fusion power project developed by the United States Naval Research Laboratory (NRL) starting in 1971. The goal of the project was to produce a controlled fusion reaction by compressing plasma inside a metal liner. The basic concept is today known as magnetized target fusion.

The reactor design was based on the mechanical compression of a molten metal liner. A chamber would be filled with molten metal and rotated along one axis, creating a cylindrical cavity in the center. A suitable fusion fuel, heated to several thousand degrees to form it into a plasma, is injected into the center of the cavity. The metal is then rapidly collapsed, and due to the conservation of magnetic flux within the metal, the plasma is confined within the resulting collapsing shell and is itself collapsed. The adiabatic process would raise the temperature and density of the trapped plasma to fusion conditions.

The use of a liquid metal liner has many advantages over previous Soviet experiments that imploded cylindrical solid metal liners to achieve high-energy-density fusion. The liquid metal liner provided the benefits of recovering the heat energy of the reaction, absorbing neutrons, transferring kinetic energy, and replacing the plasma-facing wall during each cycle. Added benefits of a liquid liner include greatly simplified servicing of the reactor, reducing radioactivity, protecting the permanent sections of the reactor from neutron damage, and reducing the danger from flying debris.

The concept was revived in the 2000s as the basis for the General Fusion design, currently being built in Canada.

== Conceptual design ==
In the Linus concept, the reactor chamber consists of a drum filled with a liquid metal liner, typically molten lead-lithium. The drum is spun, creating centrifugal force which causes the liquid to be forced onto the inside wall of the container. There is only enough liquid metal to fill perhaps 20% of the total volume, so a large open area in the middle forms during rotation. For operation, a system, typically consisting of pistons, is used to drive additional liquid metal into the drum. This causes the entire liner to be forced inward. In experimental systems, this provided about ten-to-one compression. The extra metal is then removed again by releasing the pistons, causing the compression to reverse and the metal reach the original position at the outside of the drum.

To create fusion, a fusion-fuel plasma is injected into the cavity before the piston stroke. Because of magnetic interactions in the metal, the plasma in the cavity is forced inward as well. This compression causes the plasma temperature to increase through the adiabatic process, raising it to fusion-relevant temperatures and pressures, around 100 million K and 10^{17} ions per cm^{3}. At these temperatures and pressures, the rate of fusion, according to the fusion triple product, is very rapid and completes before the mechanical compression reverses. The energy released by these reactions, in the case of the typical deuterium-tritium (D-T) fuel, is mostly in the form of high-energy neutrons about 14.1 MeV. These are captured in the liquid metal, raising its temperature. Some of the neutrons will interact with the lithium in the liner, undergoing a nuclear reaction that produces new tritium. In a functioning reactor, the energy would then be extracted using a steam generator as is the case in conventional heat driven power plants, while the tritium would be extracted through a variety of chemical processes.

A key advantage of the Linus concept is that the compression cycle is reversible, in contrast to other concepts that use thin solid metal shells that can only be used once. This allows the system to run continually, limited generally by the ability to clear out the results of the last reaction and generate and inject new fuel plasma, on a timescale of a few seconds. Additionally, systems using non-rotating shells are subject to the Rayleigh-Taylor instability and have proven extremely difficult to stabilize. The rotation of the liquid in Linus suppresses these instabilities. Finally, the metal protects the rest of the reactor from the neutron flux, which is a major problem in other designs.

== History ==
The Linus effort ultimately traces its history to a discussion between Ramy Shanny of the United States Naval Research Laboratory (NRL) and Evgeny Velikhov of the Kurchatov Institute.

The basic idea of super-high magnetic fields as a path to fusion had been considered as early as the 1950s by Andrei Sakharov, who proposed imploding metal liners to produce the required field. The concept was not picked up until the 1960s, when Velikhov began small-scale experiments. It was realized that the cost of the metal liners would likely be higher than the value of the electricity they would produce, the "kopeck problem", (Note: Named for the Soviet equivalent of a penny, the kopeck.) and they considered the idea of using a liquid metal liner instead.

Shanny asked about how such a system would be stabilized against Rayleigh-Taylor issues. Velikhov misunderstood the question, thinking he was asking how it would be stabilized against gravity within the drum. He replied that they would spin it. Shanny, believing Velikhov was saying spinning would address Rayleigh-Taylor problems, performed the calculations and found that it did indeed stabilize these instabilities. The Linus program was born.

=== Suzy I ===
To gain experience with the concept, NRL initially built liner imploders. The first experimental device was Suzy, constructed in 1971 under the direction of D.C. dePackh. The system used solid metal liners, like the Soviet experiments and many later devices. The liner was driven inward through the theta pinch process, using a 50 kJ capacitor bank.

=== Suzy II ===
A.E. Robson and P.J. Turchi joined the program in 1972, and dePackh departed NRL. Robson and Turchi continued the development of the concept with Suzy II, a similar system to what then became Suzy I, but much larger and equipped with a larger 540 kJ capacitor bank power supply. Suzy II compressed liners from an initial diameter of 20–30 cm to a final diameter of about 1 cm, giving an overall compression ratio of 28:1. Pressures greater than 20 kpsi were achieved during the implosions.

With the success of the Suzy II experiments, attention turned to the liquid liner. This was built on Suzy II using a plastic liner inside a steel drum, filled with sodium-potassium alloy (NaK) at its eutectic ratio (22% Na, 78% K) which is a liquid at room temperature. By firing the implosion bank at different powers, the relationship between implosion speed and rotation speed could be tested. As long as the rotational speed is high enough, as the liner compressed and its rotational speed increased due to conservation of angular momentum, the centripetal force kept the apparent gravity vector pointed outward. This stabilizes against R-T instabilities because it is the lighter fluid in the center falling outward, a naturally stable condition.

Suzy II was successful in producing a stable inward compression of the liner, but unfortunately, the reverse was not true. As the liner began to expand again when the compression current was turned off, it once again caused a heavy fluid to move into a lighter one, and the R-T instabilities reappeared. This caused the liner to break up into droplets, which, due to their high mass and velocity, impacted the container randomly with the entire embodied energy. In a production machine, this would be on the order of 100 MJ, the equivalent of about 50 pounds (23 kg) of TNT.

=== Piston implosion experiments ===
The solution to the liner breakup during expansion is to fill the void with additional liner material. This precludes the use of electromagnetic drivers as in Suzy, and attention turned to using a mechanical piston driving material from a reservoir into the main chamber. The piston was driven by compressed gas.

Several experimental machines followed. The first, the "water model", consisted of a drum of water with pistons positioned radially around it. The entire system spun, including the pistons. This verified the basic approach but was problematic as the piston timing proved difficult to control with the required accuracy. This problem was addressed by a new piston layout with the pistons arranged annularly that could be fired by a single source. This proved to solve the problems and plans began to build larger devices.

=== Linus-0 ===
With the success of the piston models, plans began to build a larger machine similar to the size and energy as the Suzy II machine. This led to the Linus-0 design, which consisted of a 48 inches (1,200 mm) diameter steel rotor surrounded by a gas cylinder that was pressurized to 5,000 pounds per square inch (34,000 kPa) using a series of small high-explosive DATB (C_{6}H_{5}N_{5}O_{6}) charges, also known as the polymer-bonded explosive PBXN, chosen for its high melting point, low particulate matter, and compatibly low cost. The charges were loaded into a series of ports on one end of the device and fired just before the experimental run to pressurize the system. The inner rotor was spun to 2100 RPM using a 454 cubic inch Chevrolet V8 engine.

Linus-0 proved to be slow to build due to the only machine shop large enough to make the rotor being busy with other tasks, and the device was not completed until 1978, shortly before the program closed down. Nevertheless, the system was used with water and proved to be able to make repeatable shots in the short time it was operational. During data collection, Linus-0 was fired as often as three times daily.

=== Helius ===
The delays in the construction of Linus-0 led to the construction of a half-scale version, Helius. It was designed to use liquid sodium and potassium in the liner chamber. In practice, the use of water was sufficient for the hydrodynamic studies. In the experiment, the liquid sodium-potassium liners were imploded using high-pressure Helium (120 atm) to drive mechanical pistons.

== Project fate ==
The initial proposals for the Linus designs were based on the cylindrical collapse of the liner with a continuous plasma inside. This arrangement meant there was nothing to confine the plasma from being squirted out the ends of the imploding cylinder of metal. This was not necessarily a problem; both the liner and the plasma would move at the speed of sound, but because the speed of sound in the metal is much higher than in the plasma, most of the plasma would not have time to move before it had already completed the reaction. There was some concern about bad curvature at the ends of the cylinder, which can lead to the interchange instability that operates much faster than the speed of sound. The magnitude of this effect, if was present at all, was not explored.

The disadvantage of this approach was that some plasma did escape, and that amount increased as the speed of the implosion decreased. To get a reasonable reaction rate, driver energies on the order of 75 to 100 MJ were required. While this was not impossible to achieve, it still represented a significant capital cost to build such a storage system, and the resulting high-energy and high-speed implosion represented an engineering challenge.

Linus was being developed while another fusion concept was first emerging, the field-reversed configuration, or FRC. This is essentially a smoke ring of plasma that is naturally stable until it cools. Using an FRC inside the machine would provide natural confinement at the ends of the cylinder, preventing the plasma from escaping. This would significantly reduce the required implosion energy, and thus lower the size and cost of the machine as a whole.

At the time, FRCs were very new technology. But as they appeared to represent a significant advance in the state of the art, potentially making a successful fusion system even without the implosion, NRLs interest quickly changed to the underlying physics of the FRC. Experiments on Linus-0 and Helius were relatively brief due in part to delays incurred in the design, fabrication, and assembly phases. Time wasn't allocated to recover from delays or unexpected challenges, and the machines were eventually disassembled and placed in storage.

The Linus project encountered several engineering problems which limited its performance and thus its attractiveness as an approach to commercial fusion power. These issues included performance of the plasma preparation and injection method, the ability to achieve reversible compression–expansion cycles, problems with magnetic flux diffusion into the liner material, and the ability to remove the vaporized liner material from the cavity between cycles (within a duration of about 1 s) which was not accomplished. Shortcomings also occurred with the design of the inner mechanism which pumped the liquid-metal liner.

Another major problem encountered involved hydrodynamic instabilities in the liquid liner. If the liquid was imprecisely compressed, the plasma boundaries could undergo Rayleigh–Taylor instability. This condition could quench the fusion reaction by reducing compression efficiency, and by injecting liner material (vaporized lead and lithium) contaminants into the plasma. Both effects reduce the efficiency of fusion reactions. Strong instability could even cause damage to a reactor. Synchronizing the timing of the compression system was not possible with the technology of the time, and the proposed design was canceled.

== See also ==
- Electromagnetic forming
- General Fusion
- Magnetized target fusion
- Shiva Star
