= Dundrennan Range =

Weapons testing range on the Solway Firth in south west Scotland

Coordinates: 54.8°N 4°W

Dundrennan Range is a weapons testing range on the Solway Firth, near Kirkcudbright in Dumfries and Galloway, in south west Scotland, it is part of the Ministry of Defence's Kirkcudbright Training Area.

== History ==
Previously farming land, the site of 4,700 acres (19 km^{2}) was acquired by the British Army in 1942 to train forces for the invasion of mainland Europe. The area includes a 15-by-19-mile (24 km × 31 km) sea danger area. The range takes its name from the nearby village of Dundrennan.

There is evidence of Bronze Age settlement on the site evidenced by rock art, flint tools and fortified enclosures.

== Rail gun & depleted uranium controversy ==
The range is the site of the Electro-Magnetic Launch Facility where, since 1993, the Ministry of Defence and the United States Army have been collaborating on a research project aimed at developing an electro-magnetic launcher, or railgun, capable of launching shells at 7,500 mph (12,100 km/h) and destroying a tank at a distance of five miles (8.0 km). The weapon developed at the site by the Defence Research Agency is considered to be the most successful example of a rail gun developed as it holds a number of records on velocity.

In 2001 local people raised concern over the use of depleted uranium shells on the site given health fears which had come to light after service personnel from the Gulf War had fallen sick from such ammunition, however a spokesperson from the British Army claimed the tests were entirely safe. Later that year the Scottish National Party lodged a debate in the House of Commons to call for the immediate suspension of tests on the site, however this was dismissed by the then Secretary of State for Defence Geoff Hoon.

In 2003 the renewal of the project was opposed by the then First Minister of Scotland Jack McConnell until a local consultation on the use of the weapon could be carried out, however the site continued to operate. In 2006 concerns were again raised by local MSPs Alasdair Morgan and Chris Ballance regarding the use of depleted uranium shells at the site after calls by a number of international bodies to stop the usage of such armaments given their impact on human health. It is estimated that the site has fired over 6,000 rounds of depleted uranium, amounting to 20 tons, into the Solway Firth. In 2008 the then Scottish Government environment minister Michael Russell criticised the continued tests on site of depleted uranium despite previous moves to stop the live testing.

In 2013, following European Union legislation to protect the marine environment campaigners urged the cessation of use of live shells into the sea, however notes from a Ministry of Defence meeting reveal that the legislation would not impact on the site as the shells were 'placed' not 'dumped' into the sea - a response campaigners concluded was a loophole. Later in 2013 the local MP Russell Brown said that the Ministry of Defence (MoD) had assured him that there were no plans to resume testing of such weapons on the site.

In 2019 renewed testing at the site resulted in the closure of access, installation of fencing and removal of tenant farmers and their livestock. This caused opposition amongst local residents who claimed there had been no consultation, with the MoD saying the site could be closed for up to five years.

== Current use ==
The site is used today as a field of fire and as a training site for infantry both with live and blank ammunition. The site is not open to public access during testing, except tenant farmers, as there is a danger of unexploded ordnance on the site. Given the lack of public access the Ministry of Defence report a number of rare plants in the botany of the range including glaucium flavum, yellow vetch and anacamptis pyramidalis. Limited public access is maintained on a number on specific paths and roads through the site when live testing is not being undertaken.

In March 2018, the Ministry of Defence indicated that it was at the very early stages of plans to develop and enhance the training facilities at Dundrennan.
