= Wickerman Festival =

Former annual music festival in Scotland

Coordinates: 54.819°N 3.925°W

The Wickerman Festival
- Genre: Rock, Ska, Alternative rock, Northern Soul, Dance, Indie, World music, Punk, Reggae, Folk music.
- Dates: Third weekend of July
- Locations: Dundrennan, Scotland
- Years active: 2001–2015
- Capacity: 18,000

The Wickerman from the 2006 festival

The Wickerman Festival was an annual music festival held near Auchencairn in Dumfries and Galloway, Scotland. Dubbed "Scotland's Alternative Music festival", its motto was "The Wickerman Festival – it's better than it needs to be!"

It began in 2001 when Sid Ambrose, later the festival's artistic director, hit upon the idea of a local counterculture-based, family-friendly event whilst working with the Stewartry Music Initiative. This was due in large part to the surrounding area featuring various locations used in the cult British horror film The Wicker Man (1973), starring Christopher Lee and Edward Woodward. Ambrose took the idea to local farmer Jamie Gilroy and they arranged for the festival to take place within a natural amphitheatre of 120 acres (0.49 km^{2}) of prime Galloway grazing land at East Kirkcarswell Farm, Dundrennan.

Musically and creatively, the festival was likened to a smaller version of Glastonbury, with a widely eclectic mix of music to suit everyone. It had several performance spaces including the Summerisle main stage, the Axis Sound System reggae sound system tent, the Acoustic Village, a stage for punk/ska/northern soul called the Scooter Tent, the Solus Tent for new Scottish bands and several dance tents. It additionally featured a children's area, workshops, a beer tent, craft spaces, a cinema and much more.

The festival would climax on the Saturday at midnight with the burning of a giant 30 ft (9.1 m) wicker man, built by local craftsmen Trevor Leat and Alex Rigg. The designs for these became ever more elaborate and inventive in successive years.

The 2015 festival, which had a capacity of 18,000, took place six months after the unexpected death of Jamie Gilroy, and his widow and daughter later announced it would take a hiatus for the following year. However, after failure to find a third-party promoter, in November 2016 they decided to end the festival altogether.

== Awards ==
It was nominated for two festival awards:

- Best Cult Following 2005
- Best Grassroots Festival 2006

Wickerman 2006 goers

== Charities ==
The Wickerman Festival supported these charities:

- Tusk Trust
- The First Base Agency
- Crew 2000

Via Rerrick Events, the festival's charitable arm, it raised funds for the education of young Tanzanian orphan James Okeyo through activities in the children’s area.
