= Michel Laberge =

Canadian physicist and entrepreneur

Michel Georges Laberge
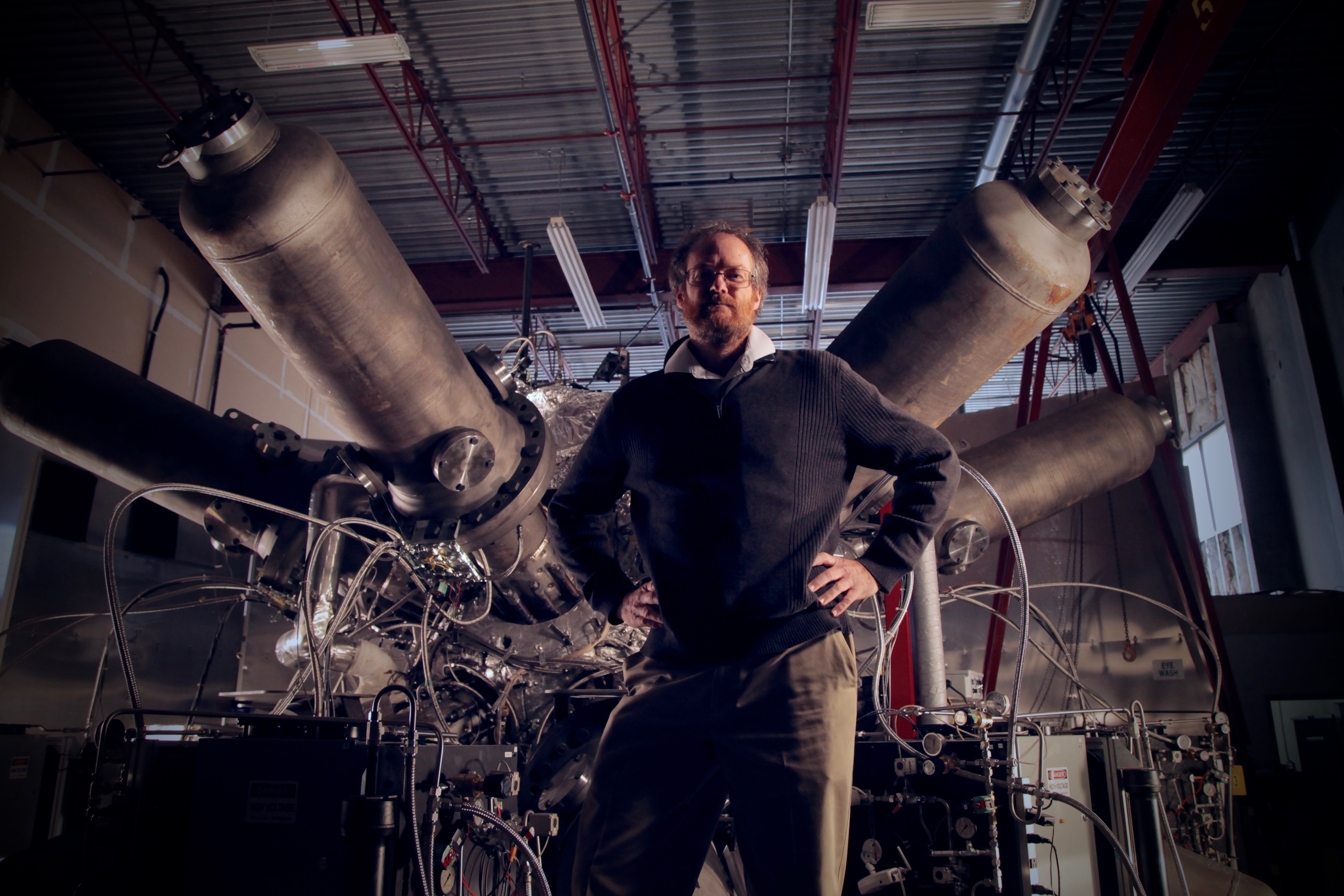
- Michel Laberge at General Fusion in front of a reactor for magnetized target fusion
- Born: Quebec, Canada
- Education: Laval University, BS, 1983; Laval University, MS, 1985; University of British Columbia, Ph.D in Physics, 1990; École Polytechnique, Paris, Post Doc, 1991; National Research Council, Ottawa, Post Doc, 1992
- Occupations: CSO of General Fusion, Inc.
- Known for: Founder of General Fusion, Inc.

Michel Laberge is a Canadian physicist and entrepreneur. He is the founder and Chief Scientific Officer of General Fusion, and was previously a senior physicist and principal engineer at Creo Products for nine years.

== Education ==
Laberge received a Bachelor of Science degree and a Master of Science degree in physics from Laval University. In 1990, he earned his Ph.D. in physics from the University of British Columbia, focusing on laser fusion. Following his Ph.D, Laberge undertook two consecutive postdoctoral research positions, first in 1991 at the École Polytechnique in Paris then at the National Research Council in Ottawa (1992).

== Business career ==
During his time at Creo Products, Laberge developed digital laser technologies for industrial laser printers. In the 1990s, his role as senior physicist and principal engineer involved aligning laser diodes to mitigate the effects of microbanding - a printing artifact that results in unwanted parallel stripes. Later, Laberge supervised a team of five engineers to develop a digital micromirror device for the booming telecom industry. The team produced a device in six months that outperformed the market competition, but the project was terminated due to lack of investment as a result of the telecoms crash.

After his work at Creo, Laberge founded General Fusion in an effort to demonstrate the feasibility of magnetized target fusion as a commercial energy source. Initially, Dr. Laberge worked alone in a converted gas-station garage in British Columbia to develop a proof of concept prototype reactor. The company has since secured funding and has expanded to larger facilities, where 65 people were employed as of 2017.

== Patents ==
Dr. Laberge holds several patents in the United States and Canada, primarily related to optics and fusion applications.

- US 5305091 Optical coordinate measuring system for large objects
- US 5818498 Method of multi-channel thermal recording
- US 5920394 Optical coordinate measuring machine
- US 6252622 Fault tolerant laser diode array
- US 6660997 Absolute position Moiré type encoder for use in a control system
- US 6763160 Optical cross connect switch having improved alignment control system
- US 6832552 Method of automated setting of imaging and processing parameters
- US 6941035 Optical cross-connect switch
- US 9403191 Pressure wave generator with a sabot launched piston
- US 9463478 Jet control devices and methods
