= General Fusion =

Canadian company created to develop fusion power

General Fusion Inc.
- Type: Public
- Traded as: Nasdaq: GFUZ
- Industry: Fusion power
- Founded: 2002; 24 years ago
- Founder: Michel Laberge
- Headquarters: Richmond, British Columbia, Canada
- Number of employees: c. 150 (2024)
- Website: generalfusion.com

General Fusion Inc. is a Canadian company based in Richmond, British Columbia, which is developing a fusion power technology based on magnetized target fusion (MTF). The firm was founded in 2002 by Dr. Michel Laberge. As of 2024, it has more than 150 employees.

The technology under development injects a magnetized target, a plasma mass in the form of a type of plasmoid termed a compact toroid, into a cylinder of spinning liquid metal. The target is mechanically compressed to fusion-relevant densities and pressures, by anywhere from a dozen to hundreds (in various designs) of steam-driven pistons.

In 2018, the firm published papers on a spherical tokamak and a recent conceptual design was presented at the 30th IEEE Symposium of Fusion Engineering (SOFE). In August 2023, the company announced an updated plan to build a new fusion demonstration machine – Lawson Machine 26 (LM26) – at its Canadian headquarters. The company says LM26 is designed to achieve fusion conditions of over 100 million degrees Celsius (10 keV) by 2025 and progress towards scientific breakeven equivalent by 2026. This was an adjustment to its previously announced Fusion Demonstration Program. In June 2021, the company announced it would build 70% of a full-scale fusion demonstration plant in the UK as part of a public-private partnership with the UK Government.

== History ==
General Fusion predictions that fusion power is only 10 years away, plotted over time.

The firm was founded in 2002 by former Creo senior physicist and principal engineer Michel Laberge.

In 2005 it produced a fusion reaction in its first MTF prototype. In 2010, it produced its first at-scale plasma injector with magnetically confined plasma. In 2011 it first demonstrated compressive heating of magnetized plasma.

A proof-of-concept compression system was built in 2013 with 14 full size pistons arranged around a 1-meter diameter spherical compression chamber to demonstrate pneumatic compression and collapse of a liquid metal vortex. The pneumatic pistons were used to create a converging spherical wave to compress the liquid metal. The 100 kg, 30 cm diameter hammer pistons were driven down a 1 m-long (3.3 ft) bore by compressed air. The hammer piston struck an anvil at the end of the bore, generating a large amplitude acoustic pulse that was transmitted to the liquid metal in the compression chamber. To create a spherical wave, the timing of these strikes had to be controlled to within 10 μs. The firm recorded sequences of consecutive shots with impact velocities of 50 m/s and timing synchronized within 2 μs. However it was found that the wall of the liquid metal vortex turned to a spray soon after the arrival of the pressure wave.

From its inception until 2016, the firm built more than a dozen plasma injectors. These include large two-stage injectors with formation and magnetic acceleration sections (dubbed "PI" experiments), and three generations of smaller, single-stage formation-only injectors (MRT, PROSPECTOR and SPECTOR). The firm published research demonstrating SPECTOR lifespans of up to 2 milliseconds and temperatures in excess of 400 eV.

As of 2016, the firm had developed the power plant's subsystems, including plasma injectors and compression driver technology. Patents were awarded in 2006 for a fusion energy reactor design, and enabling technologies such as plasma accelerators (2015), methods for creating liquid metal vortexes (2016) and lithium evaporators (2016).

In 2016 the GF design used compact toroid plasmas formed by a coaxial Marshal gun (a type of plasma railgun), with magnetic fields supported by internal plasma currents and eddy currents in the flux conserver wall. In 2016, the firm reported plasma lifetimes up to 2 milliseconds and electron temperatures in excess of 400 eV (4,800,000 °C).

Around 2017 the company performed a series of experiments named Plasma Compression Small (PCS). These implosion experiments used a chemical driver to compress an aluminum liner onto a compact toroid plasma. Because the implosions involved chemical explosives, the tests took place outdoors in remote locations. The tests were destructive and could only be executed every few months. These tests were carried out to advance the understanding of plasma compression with the goal of advancing toward a nuclear-reactor scale demonstration.

As of December 2017, the PI3 plasma injector held the title as the world's most powerful plasma injector, ten times more powerful than its predecessor. It also achieved stable compression of plasma.

In 2019 it successfully confined plasma within its liquid metal cavity. From 2019 to 2021 it increased plasma performance.

As of 2021, the firm demonstrated compression of a water cavity into a controlled, symmetrical shape.

Also in 2021 the company agreed to build a demonstration plant in Oxfordshire, at Culham, the center of the UK's nuclear R&D. The plant was planned to be 70% of the size of a commercial power plant. The company claimed it had validated all the individual components for the demonstration reactor. However, as of 2026 the company's commercialization plan includes four years of system validation casting doubt on the earlier claims.

In 2022, the company announced that it had completed 200,000+ plasma shots, filed 150 patents/patents pending, and that headcount had passed 200. PI3 reached 10 ms confinement times and temperatures of 250 eV, almost 3 million degrees Celsius, without active magnetic stabilization, auxiliary heating, or a conventional divertor. Its primary compression testbed, a 1:10 scale system using water rather than liquid metal, has completed over 1,000 shots, behaving as predicted.

According to the 2023 Fusion Industry Association report, the company has 150 employees and has raised approximately US$300,000,000+.

In 2023, the firm reduced headcount significantly and announced that it was building a new machine, "LM26", with the goal of achieving breakeven by 2026. The Fusion Demonstration Plant being built in the UK will be delayed.

In May 2025, the firm again announced layoffs of about 25% of its workforce and reduction in operation of LM26, following an "unexpected and urgent financing constraint."

In January 2026, General Fusion announced plans to become a public company via a special purpose acquisition company merger by the middle of the year.

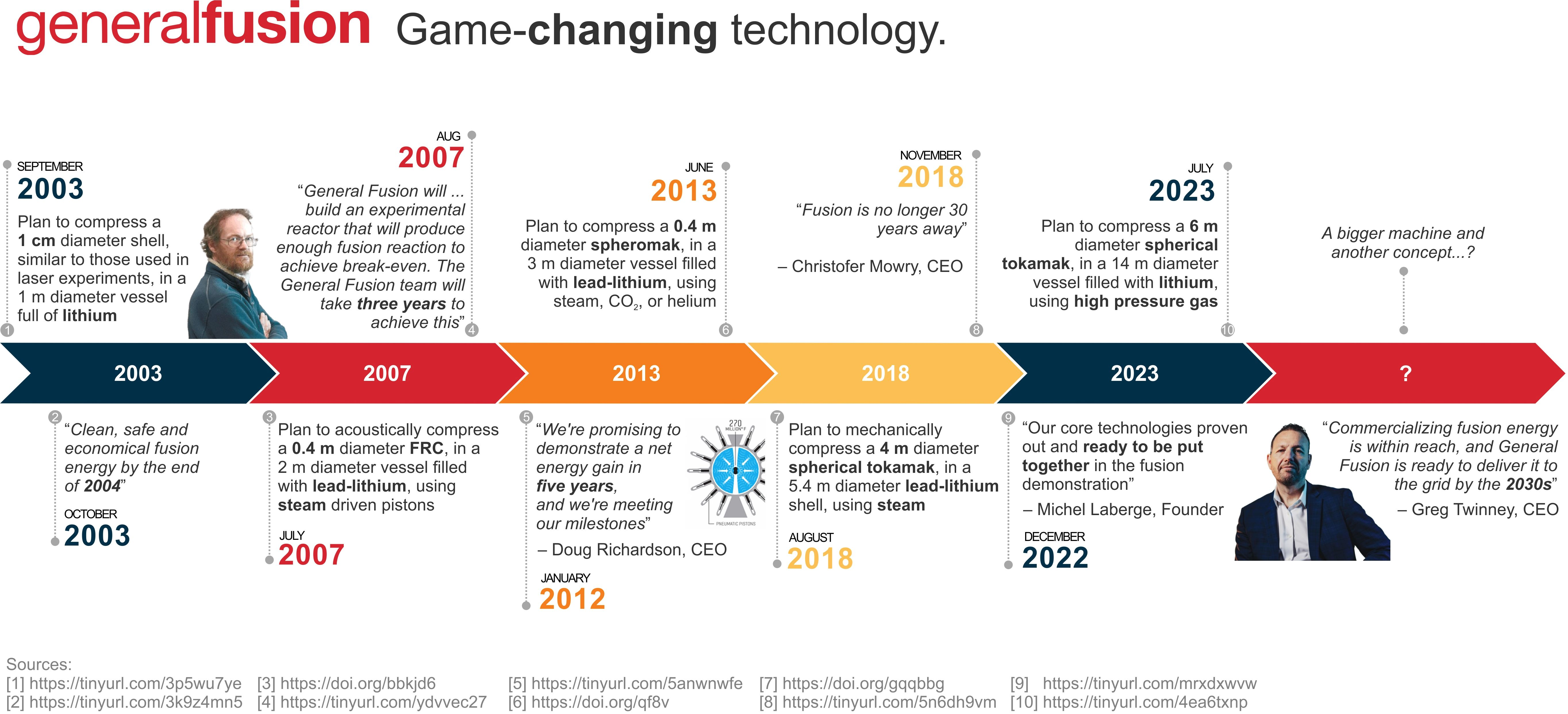
General Fusion technology development timeline

== Organization ==
General Fusion's CEO is Greg Twinney. The company's website states Greg joined General Fusion in 2020 with a well-established track record of executive leadership. Serving as General Fusion's chief financial officer for two years, he expanded the company's investor base and helped to launch the failed Fusion Demonstration Program. In 2022, he became General Fusion's chief executive officer.

Michel Laberge is the founder and Chief Science Officer of General Fusion. Prior to establishing General Fusion, Michel spent nine years at Creo Products in Vancouver as a senior physicist and principal engineer.

The board of directors is chaired by Klaas De Boer, who currently chairs AIM-listed Xeros Technology Group and serves on the Boards of SmartKem and veriNOS pharmaceuticals.

== Technology ==
Diagram of the General Fusion power plant

General Fusion's approach is based on the Linus concept developed by the United States Naval Research Laboratory (NRL) beginning in 1972. Researchers at NRL suggested an approach that retains many of the advantages of liner compression to achieve small-scale, high-energy-density fusion. According to Laberge, Linus could not properly time the compression using the technology of the era. Faster computers provide the required timing. However, this claim is not borne out by the literature as various Linus devices with no timing constraints, including systems using single pistons, were built during the experimental runs during the 1970s and demonstrated fully reversible compression strokes.

General Fusion's magnetized target fusion system uses a ~3 meter sphere filled with liquid metal. The liquid is spun, creating a vertical cavity in the centre of the sphere. This vortex flow is established and maintained by an external pumping system; liquid flows into the sphere through tangentially directed ports at the equator and exits radially through ports near the poles of the sphere.

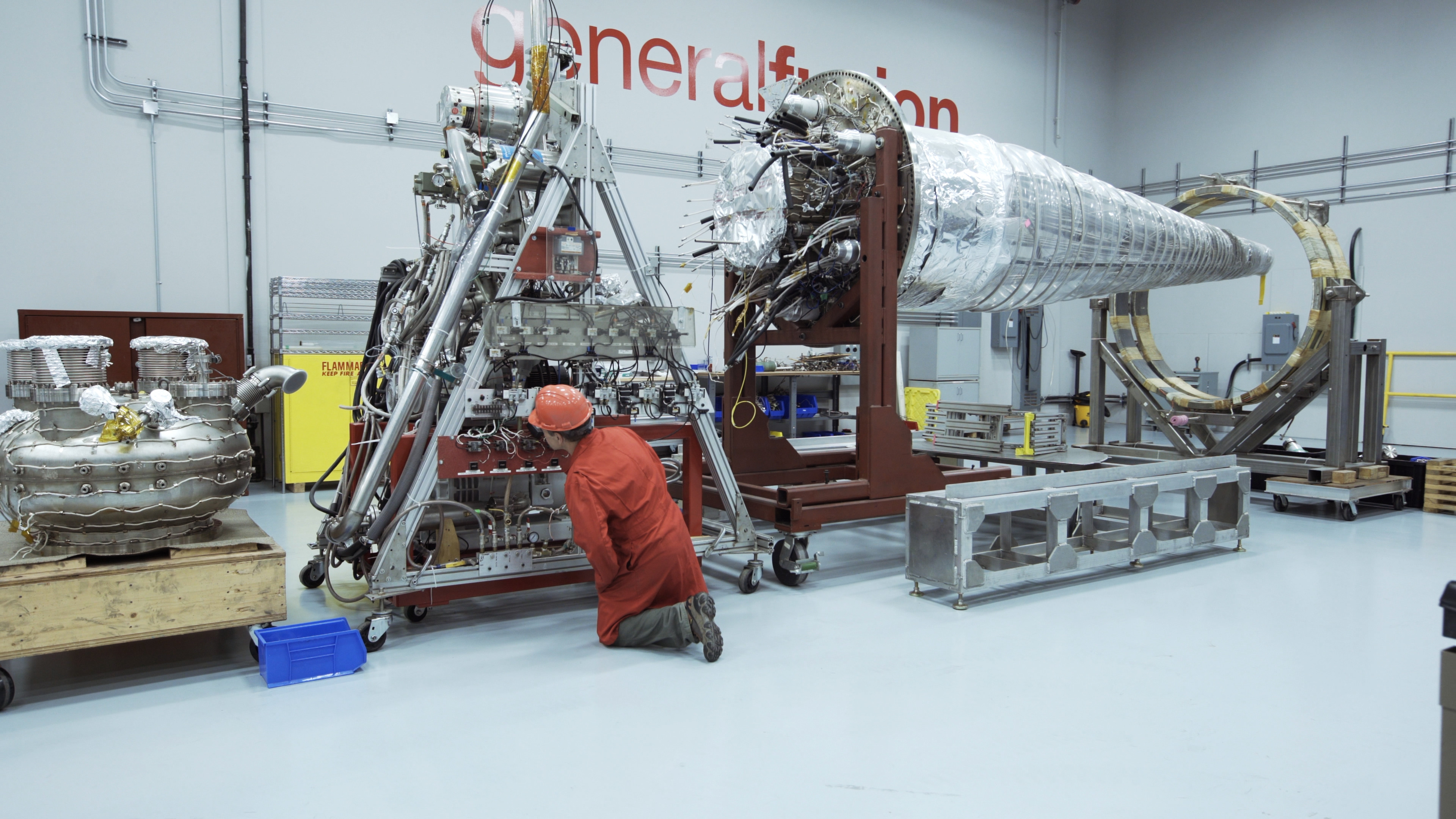
Plasma injector

A plasma injector is attached to the top of the sphere, from which a pulse of magnetically confined deuterium-tritium plasma fuel is injected into the center of the vortex. A few milligrams of gas are used per pulse. The gas is ionized by a bank of capacitors to form a spherical tokamak plasma (self-confined magnetized plasma rings) composed of the deuterium–tritium fuel.

The outside of the sphere is covered with steam pistons, which push the liquid metal and collapse the vortex, thereby compressing the plasma. The compression increases the density and temperature of the plasma to the range where the fuel atoms fuse, releasing energy in the form of fast neutrons and alpha particles.

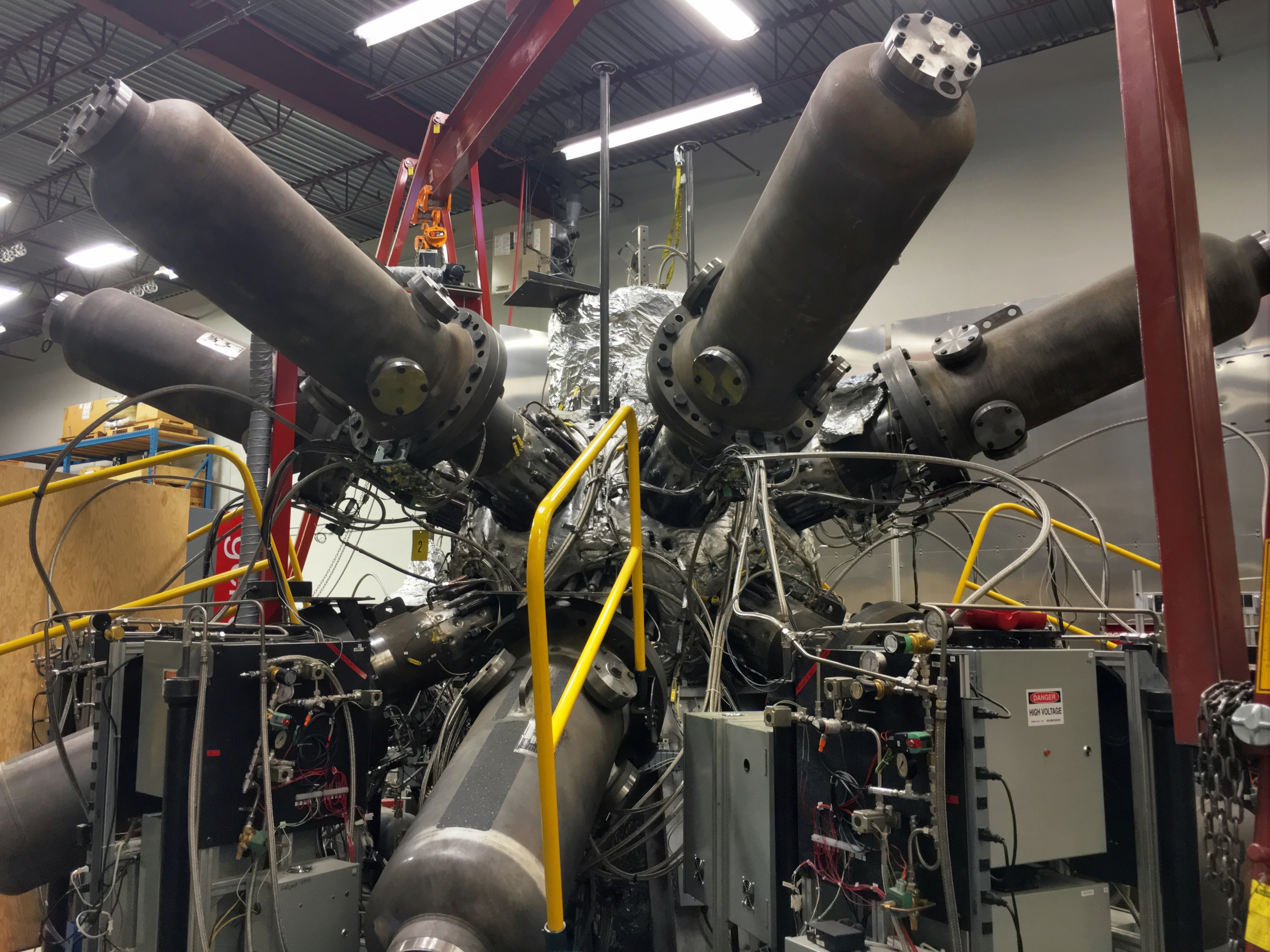
Pistons for plasma compression

This energy heats the liquid metal, which is then pumped through a heat exchanger to generate electricity via a steam turbine. The plasma forming and compressing process repeats and the liquid metal is continuously pumped through the system. Some of the steam is recycled to power the pistons.

In addition to its role in compressing the plasma, the liquid metal liner shields the power plant structure from neutrons released by the deuterium-tritium fusion reaction, overcoming the problem of structural damage to plasma-facing materials. The lithium in the mixture breeds tritium.

=== Lawson Machine 26 (LM26) ===
In August 2023, General Fusion announced it intends to build a new fusion demonstration machine named Lawson Machine 26 (LM26) to achieve important technical milestones using magnetized target fusion. LM26 aims to achieve fusion conditions of over 100 million degrees Celsius by 2025 and progress towards scientific breakeven equivalent by 2026.

LM26 will use a Marshall gun to inject a deuterium plasma into a target chamber. The target chamber's outer wall is a solid lithium liner contained within a cylindrical composite vacuum vessel. Toroidal coils mounted on the outside of the cylindrical vessel are pulsed and push on the liner to initiate compression. As the liner collapses, the plasma is compressed to higher density and temperature.

In January 2024, the company reported it had achieved symmetrical compression of a solid lithium ring within a few weeks of announcing LM26 and had built and began operating a compression test bed for LM26 named Prototype 0.

=== Fusion Demonstration Program ===
The Fusion Demonstration Program is a 70% scale prototype which was being built in Oxfordshire, UK with a reported cost of US$400 million. It had been announced that the core technology had been proven out and was ready to be put together and that the plant was to commence operations in 2027. However the plant was put on hold in 2023 when the company announced that it would instead build a different machine in Canada aimed at demonstrating breakeven by 2026.

The plant had several key differences from the commercial power plant concept:

- 70% scale.
- 1 pulse per day repetition rate vs 1 pulse per second for a power plant.
  - Among other things this increases the time available to re-establish the high vacuum conditions required for plasma formation by a factor of 86400, avoiding a significant engineering obstacle that will need to be solved for any future commercial application to be viable.
- Drive gas system using helium rather than hydraulic rams.
- A compression system using liquid lithium rather than lead-lithium.
  - Ideally plasma facing materials should be composed of light elements. Plasma contamination by heavier elements, such as lead, significantly increase plasma power loss due to Bremsstrahlung radiation. The choice of lithium rather than lead-lithium therefore significantly reduces plasma power losses making the demonstration program much more viable than it otherwise would be. However, this comes at the expense of having to solve materials compatibility issues with lithium rather than lead-lithium as will be necessary for any future power plant.

=== Conceptual design ===
In General Fusion's most recent conceptual design, the MTF power plant proposed by General Fusion would produce about 300 MWe from two 150 MW machines running in tandem. The net thermal efficiency of the conceptual power plant is approximately 17%.

== Challenges ==
Magnetized target fusion has a number of challenges. General Fusion's founder and Chief Science Officer noted several specific difficulties that are not present in DC tokamaks. These include, but are not limited to:

- Confinement at high energy density is not known.
- Liquid metal vaporization. To address this challenge, the company is collaborating with Lawrence Livermore National Laboratory to better predict how its plasma will behave as it is compressed to fusion conditions in its MTF machine.
- Impurities from the liquid metal cooling the plasma.
- Forming an initial spherical liquid surface and symmetry of implosion. In January 2022, the company announced its primary liquid compression prototype successfully compressed a water cavity. The peer-reviewed results from these experiments validate a numerical model at 10% scale with radial compression of 7:1 vs 10:1 required for a commercial machine.
- Kink instability of the liquid metal shaft.
- Flux diffusion in the liquid metal.

Laberge stated that these challenges were still to be solved. Indeed, General Fusion are yet to demonstrate mechanical compression of a plasma by a liquid metal wall, despite this being a key technology required for their powerplant. Nor have they demonstrated a liquid metal shaft, or a means of re-establishing high vacuum conditions in the short time interval (<1 s) between pulses.

Generating low cost electricity is also a challenge. General Fusion investor material states a predicted levelized cost of electricity of 64-$73 /MWh. However, this has been shown to be unattainable. This is primarily because the MTF power plant proposed by General Fusion consumes most of the electricity it generates.

== Research collaborations ==
- Canadian Nuclear Laboratories (CNL): In November 2022, General Fusion and CNL signed an MOU to collaborate on projects in key areas, including feasibility studies, regulatory framework, power plant siting and deployment, infrastructure design, and testing and operations support. In April 2024, the partners launched a new project to examine and propose the most efficient and cost-effective designs to integrate the fusion machine, balance of plant, and power conversion systems in a MTF commercial power plant.
- Princeton Plasma Physics Laboratory (PPPL): General Fusion partners with PPPL through the U.S. Department of Energy Innovation Network for Fusion Energy (INFUSE) program. In March 2024, the company presented a plasma stability analysis completed with PPPL at the program's annual workshop. The project applied advanced computational stability analyses to model equilibrium states of plasma, providing insights important for the company's MTF machine.
- Oak Ridge National Laboratory (ORNL): General Fusion partners with ORNL through the U.S. Department of Energy Innovation Network for Fusion Energy (INFUSE) program. The company has announced two projects with ORNL to provide modelling and study plasma diagnostics for a commercial MTF machine.
- Savannah River National Laboratory (SRNL): General Fusion partners with SRNL through the U.S. Department of Energy Innovation Network for Fusion Energy (INFUSE) program. SRNL is completing research modelling the tritium fuel cycle and the total inventory of tritium required for a MTF commercial power plant.
- TRIUMF: In March 2024, General Fusion and TRIUMF announced they are developing an ultra-fast neutron spectrometer with new funding from Canada's NSERC program. The neutron spectrometer system is a flagship project under the collaborative agreement signed by TRIUMF and General Fusion in 2023. Simon Fraser University and Université de Sherbrooke are also collaborating on the project.
- University of Lisbon: In December 2023, General Fusion and the University of Lisbon's Instituto Superior Técnico (IST) announced a collaboration agreement, through the university's Instituto de Plasmas e Fusão Nuclear (IPFN) research unit, to develop a key diagnostic for the company's Magnetized Target Fusion technology. The reflectometer diagnostic will provide data about plasma density in the company's plasma injector.
- Kyoto Fusioneering: In October 2023, General Fusion and Kyoto Fusioneering announced a collaborative agreement. The companies will collaborate to advance critical systems for MTF commercialization, including the tritium fuel cycle, liquid metal balance of plant, and power conversion cycle.
- Microsoft: In May 2017 General Fusion and Microsoft announced a collaboration to develop a data science platform based on Microsoft's Azure cloud computing system. A second phase of the project was to apply machine learning to the data, with the goal of discovering insights into the behavior of high temperature plasmas. The new computational program would enable General Fusion to mine over 100 terabytes of data from the records of over 150,000 experiments. It was to use this data to optimize the designs of their fusion system's plasma injector, piston array, and fuel chamber. During this collaboration, the Microsoft Develop Experience Team was to contribute their experience and resources in machine learning, data management, and cloud computing.
- Los Alamos National Laboratory (LANL): General Fusion entered a cooperative research and development agreement (CRADA) with the U.S. Department of Energy's LANL for magnetized target fusion research.
- McGill University: In 2017, McGill and General Fusion acquired an Engage Grant from the Natural Sciences and Engineering Research Council of Canada to study General Fusion's technology. Specifically, the project was to use McGill's diagnostic abilities to develop techniques to understand the behavior of the liquid metal wall during plasma compression and how it might affect the plasma.
- Princeton Plasma Physics Laboratory: In 2016 the two created an magnetohydrodynamics (MHD) simulation of compression during MTF experiments
- Queen Mary University of London: In 2015 General Fusion funded a research study on high fidelity simulations of non-linear sound propagation in multiphase media of nuclear fusion reactor pursued using QMUL CLithium and Y codes.
- Hatch Ltd: General Fusion and Hatch joined in 2015 to create a fusion energy demonstration system. The project aimed to build and demonstrate, at power plant scale, the primary subsystems and physics underpinning General Fusion's technology, including their proprietary Magnetized Target Fusion (MTF) technology. Simulation models will be used to verify that this fusion energy system is commercially and technically viable at scale.
- Culham Centre for Fusion Energy: In June 2021, General Fusion announced it would accept the UK government's offer to host the world's first substantial public-private partnership fusion demonstration plant, at Culham. The plant will be built from 2022 to 2025 and is intended to lead the way for commercial pilot plants in the late 2020s or early 2030s. The plant will be 70% of full scale and is expected to attain a stable plasma of 150 million degrees using deuterium fuel. In October 2022 the UKAEA and General Fusion elaborated on the nature of their partnership, stating that it will "harness UKAEA's extensive neutron modelling software and expertise to simulate the neutron flux distribution from General Fusion's operational large-scale plasma injector", including by building a new, larger Thomson scattering system for General Fusion's demonstration machine.

== Funding ==
As of 2021, General Fusion had received $430 million in funding. General Fusion was not among the eight companies to receive funding as part of the United States Department of Energy Milestone-Based Fusion Development Program.

In May 2025, General Fusion released an open letter requesting additional funding against the backdrop of a challenging funding landscape and reduced operations: "All we need now is the capital to finish the job. We are opening our doors and actively seeking strategic options..." Reports indicate that the level of staff reduction is 25% of a 140-strong workforce.

=== Rounds ===
Investors included Chrysalix venture capital, the Business Development Bank of Canada—a Canadian federal Crown corporation, Bezos Expeditions, Cenovus Energy, Pender Ventures, Khazanah Nasional—a Malaysian sovereign wealth fund, and Sustainable Development Technology Canada (STDC).

Chrysalix Energy Venture Capital, a Vancouver-based venture capital firm, led a C$1.2 million seed round of financing in 2007. Other Canadian venture capital firms that participated in the seed round were GrowthWorks Capital and BDC Venture Capital.

In 2009, a consortium led by General Fusion was awarded C$13.9 million by SDTC to conduct a four-year research project on "Acoustically Driven Magnetized Target Fusion"; SDTC is a foundation established by the Canadian government. The other member of the consortium is Los Alamos National Laboratory.

A 2011 Series B round raised $19.5 million from a syndicate including Bezos Expeditions, Braemar Energy Ventures, Business Development Bank of Canada, Cenovus Energy, Chrysalix Venture Capital, Entrepreneurs Fund, and Pender Ventures.

In May 2015 the government of Malaysia's sovereign wealth fund, Khazanah Nasional Berhad, led a $27 million funding round.

SDTC awarded General Fusion a further C$12.75 million in March 2016 to for the project "Demonstration of fusion energy technology" in a consortium with McGill University (Shock Wave Physics Group) and Hatch Ltd.

In October 2018 Canadian Minister for Innovation, Science and Economic Development, Navdeep Bains, announced that the Canadian government's Strategic Innovation Fund would invest C$49.3 million in General Fusion.

In December 2019, General Fusion raised $65 million in Series E equity financing from Singapore's Temasek Holdings, Bezos and Chrisalix, concurrently with another $38 million from Canada's Strategic Innovation Fund. The firm said the funds would permit it to begin the design, construction, and operation of its Fusion Demonstration Plant.

In January 2021, the company announced funding by Shopify founder Tobias Lütke's Thistledown Capital.

In November 2021, the company completed an over-subscribed $130M Series E round. Investors included Bezos, Business Development Bank of Canada, hedge fund Segra Capital Management and family-office investors. Funds were to be dedicated to building a commercial reactor.

In August 2023, the company completed the first close of its Series F raise for a combined US$25 million of funding. The round was anchored by existing investors, BDC Capital and GIC. It also included new grant funding from the Government of British Columbia.

In December 2023, the company announced the Canadian government invested an additional CA$5 million through Canada's Strategic Investment Fund to advance its LM26 fusion demonstration machine at its Richmond headquarters.

In August 2025, the company completed an $22M funding round. Segra Capital and PenderFund secured representation on the company's board of directors. Shortly thereafter in November 2025 the company raised an additional $51M in the form of simple agreement for future equity (SAFE). The company did not publicize this funding, which came primarily from Segra Capital and PenderFund.

== Crowdsourced innovations ==
Beginning in 2015, the firm conducted three crowdsourcing challenges through Waltham, Massachusetts-based firm Innocentive.

The first challenge was Method for Sealing Anvil Under Repetitive Impacts Against Molten Metal. General Fusion successfully sourced a solution for "robust seal technology" capable of withstanding extreme temperatures and repetitive hammering, so as to isolate the rams from the liquid metal that fills the sphere. The firm awarded Kirby Meacham, an MIT-trained mechanical engineer from Cleveland, Ohio, the $20,000 prize.

A second challenge, Data-Driven Prediction of Plasma Performance, began in December 2015 with the aim of identifying patterns in the firm's experimental data that would allow it to further improve the performance of its plasma.

The third challenge ran in March 2016, seeking a method to induce a substantial current to jump a 5–10 cm gap within a few hundred microseconds, and was titled "Fast Current Switch in Plasma Device". A prize of $5,000 was awarded to a post-doctoral researcher at University of Notre Dame.

== See also ==
- China Fusion Engineering Test Reactor
- DEMOnstration Power Plant (DEMO)
- Fusion Industry Association
- Helion Energy
- History of nuclear fusion
- ITER
- List of nuclear fusion companies
- Lockheed Martin Compact Fusion Reactor
- Spherical Tokamak for Energy Production
- TAE Technologies
- TerraPower
- Tokamak Energy

== Readings ==
- Kanellos, Michael (8 September 2009). "A Guide to New Nuclear". Greentech Media. Wood Mackenzie Business.
- Harris, Richard (9 November 2011). "'Power for the Planet': Company Bets Big on Fusion". NPR.
- Waldrop, M. Mitchell (23 July 2014). "Nature News Feature: Plasma Physics: The fusion upstarts". Nature. 511 (7510): 398–400. doi:10.1038/511398a. PMID 25056045. S2CID 4468596.
