= Yellow vetch =

Yellow vetch is a common name for several plants and may refer to:

- Lathyrus aphaca, native to the Middle East
- Vicia lutea, native Europe, western Asia, and North Africa
