= Combustion light-gas gun =

Type of projectile weapon

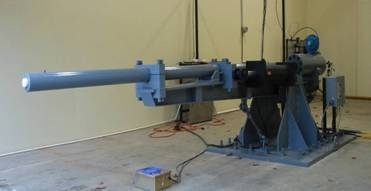
Utron Inc.’s 45mm gun

A combustion light-gas gun (CLGG) is a projectile weapon that utilizes the explosive force of low molecular-weight combustible gases, such as hydrogen mixed with oxygen, as propellant. When the gases are ignited, they burn, expand and propel the projectile out of the barrel with higher efficiency relative to solid propellant and have achieved higher muzzle velocities in experiments. Combustion light-gas gun technology is one of the areas being explored in an attempt to achieve higher velocities from artillery to gain greater range. Conventional guns use solid propellants, usually nitrocellulose-based compounds, to develop the chamber pressures needed to accelerate the projectiles. CLGGs' gaseous propellants are able to increase the propellant's specific impulse. Therefore, hydrogen is typically the first choice; however, other propellants like methane can be used.

While this technology does appear to provide higher velocities, the main drawback with gaseous or liquid propellants for gun systems is the difficulty in getting uniform and predictable ignition and muzzle velocities. Variance with muzzle velocities affects precision in range, and the further a weapon shoots, the more significant these variances become. If an artillery system cannot maintain uniform and predictable muzzle velocities it will be of no use at longer ranges. Another issue is the survival of projectile payloads at higher accelerations. Fuzes, explosive fill, and guidance systems all must be "hardened" against the significant acceleration loads of conventional artillery to survive and function properly. Higher velocity weapons, like the CLGG, face these engineering challenges as they edge the boundaries of firing accelerations higher.

The research and development firm UTRON, Inc is experimenting with a combustion light-gas gun design for field use. The corporation claims to have a system ready for testing as a potential long-range naval fire support weapon for emerging ships, such as the Zumwalt-class destroyer. The CLGG, like the railgun, is a possible candidate technology for greater ranges for naval systems, among others. UTRON has built and tested 45mm and 155mm combustion light-gas guns.

== See also ==
- Light-gas gun
- Scram cannon
- Electrothermal-chemical technology
- Potato cannon
