= MARAUDER =

US Air Force plasma railgun experiment

MARAUDER (Magnetically Accelerated Ring to Achieve Ultra-high Directed Energy and Radiation) was a United States Air Force Research Laboratory project concerning the development of a coaxial plasma railgun. The first computer simulations occurred in 1990, and its first published experiment appeared on August 1, 1993.

== Objectives ==
The first MARAUDER experiment was motivated by RACE, or the Ring Accelerator Experiment, which took place in 1991 at Lawrence Livermore National Laboratory. The ultimate goal of the MARAUDER program was to accelerate highly dense toroids containing plasma to high speeds. Such a system could be used for "hypervelocity projectiles," x-ray production, and electrical power amplification. The stated goals of the program included studying the "formation, compression, and acceleration of magnetized plasma rings."

Specifically, the objective of the program was the acceleration of a toroid of 0.5 to 2 milligrams (0.0077 to 0.0309 gr) plasma to a kinetic energy level on the order of megajoules using a 5–10 MJ coaxial gun design.

== Design ==
In 1993, the Phillips Laboratory developed a coaxial plasma gun capable of accelerating 1 to 2 milligrams (0.015 to 0.031 gr) of plasma by up to 100 billion g (9.8×10^{11} m/s^{2}) in a toroid of 1 meter in diameter. The toroids are similar to spheromaks, but differ in that an inner conductor is used to accelerate the plasma and that confinement behavior results from interactions of the toroid with its surrounding atmosphere. It utilized the Shiva Star capacitor bank to satisfy the large energy requirements that were needed.

The plasma projectiles would be shot at a speed expected to be 3,000 kilometres per second (1,900 mi/s) in 1995 and 10,000 kilometres per second (6,200 mi/s) (3% of the speed of light) by 2000. A shot has the energy of 5 pounds of TNT (2.27 kilograms of TNT (9.5 MJ)). Doughnut-shaped rings of plasma and balls of lightning caused "extreme mechanical and thermal shock" when hitting their target, as well as producing a pulse of electromagnetic radiation that could scramble electronics.

== See also ==
- Casaba-Howitzer
- Directed-energy weapon
- Nuclear pumped laser
