= List of scientific demonstrations =

This is a list of scientific demonstrations used in educational demonstrations and popular science lectures.

== Physics ==
- Balsa wood bridge — demonstrates compressive strength and tensile strength, teaches engineering thinking
- Egg drop competition — demonstrates compressive strength, teaches engineering thinking
- Hand boiler — demonstrates vapour-liquid equilibrium and simple heat engine principles
- Newton's cradle — demonstrates elastic collision, conservation of momentum, and conservation of energy
- Gauss gun
- Plate trick or Dirac belt trick — demonstrates spinors and the double cover of SO(3) by SU(2)
- Prince Rupert's Drop — demonstrates supercooling and tensile stress
- Self-siphoning beads — demonstrates momentum, energy and inertia
- Water rocket — demonstrates conservation of momentum, conservation of energy, the gas laws and basic rocketry
- Franklin bells — demonstrate electric charges
- Oxford Electric Bell — an experimental electric bell that was set up in 1840 and which has run nearly continuously ever since
- Wimshurst machine — an electrostatic generator
- Shooting a candle through a plank
- Foucault pendulum — demonstrates the rotation of Earth

== Chemistry ==
- Ammonia fountain — introduces concepts like solubility and the gas laws at entry level.
- Barking dog reaction — demonstrates rapid exothermic chemical reaction
- Blue bottle (chemical reaction) — demonstrates reduction and oxidation reactions, and chemical colour change
- Chemical garden
- Diet Coke and Mentos eruption — demonstrates bubble nucleation
- Dry ice color show
- Elephant toothpaste
- Fizz keeper
- Flame test
- Magic sand — demonstrates hydrophobic substances
- Mercury beating heart — demonstrates electrochemical redox reaction. and an effect of a non-homogeneous electrical double layer
- Screaming jelly babies — demonstrates the energy within candy
- Using liquid nitrogen to shatter a rose
- Detonating a cloud of flour

== See also ==
- Science education
- Science, technology, engineering, and mathematics
