= GR-1 "Anvil" =

Most powerful portable shoulder-fired coilgun

Arcflash Labs GR-1 "Anvil"
- Type: Bullpup coilgun
- Place of origin: United States

Production history
- Designer: Arcflash Labs
- Manufacturer: Arcflash Labs
- Unit cost: $4,000.00 USD
- Produced: 2021–2023

Specifications
- Mass: 20 pounds (9.1 kg)
- Length: 38 inches (97 cm)
- Barrel length: 26 inches (66 cm)
- Width: 3 inches (7.6 cm)
- Height: 8 inches (20 cm)
- Caliber: 10 to 12 mm (0.39 to 0.47 in) projectiles
- Rate of fire: Up to 100 rounds/min
- Muzzle velocity: Up to 75 m/s
- Feed system: Ten-round magazine

The Arcflash Labs GR-1 "Anvil" is a portable shoulder-fired semi-automatic bullpup 8-stage coilgun designed and manufactured by Arcflash Labs in Los Angeles, California. It is the most powerful handheld coilgun ever sold publicly. It was developed 3 years after the EMG-01A.

== Operating mechanism ==
The GR-1 uses a clamped quasi-resonant (CQR) step-up inverter described in U.S. Patent 10,811,995, which allows a six-cell 25.2 volt lithium-ion polymer battery to supply up to 1000 watts of power to eight high-voltage electrolytic capacitors in approximately three seconds. As with most coilguns, the eight aforementioned capacitors are used to power eight respective electromagnetic coils in the configuration of a linear motor to accelerate a ferromagnetic or conducting projectile to high velocity.

Although the "GR" designation purports the device to be a "Gauss Rifle", as evidenced both by the company and media reports, this is technically a misnomer on two counts—it is neither a rifle (as it doesn't use rifling) nor a Gauss gun (a type of accelerator that uses permanent magnets and is distinct from a coilgun).

== Legality ==
Under United States law, "firearms" are defined as propelling a projectile by combustion. Coilguns such as the GR-1 do not have any combustion mechanism, and therefore are not legally considered firearms. However, Arcflash Labs legally refers to the GR-1 as an air gun out of an abundance of caution.
