= Coilgun =

Artillery using coils to electromagnetically propel a projectile

Simplified diagram of a multistage coilgun with three coils, a barrel, and a ferromagnetic projectile

A coilgun is a type of mass driver consisting of one or more coils used as electromagnets in the configuration of a linear motor that accelerate a ferromagnetic or conducting projectile to high velocity. In almost all coilgun configurations, the coils and the gun barrel are arranged on a common axis. A coilgun is not a rifle as the barrel is smoothbore (not rifled).

Coilguns generally consist of one or more coils arranged along a barrel, so the path of the accelerating projectile lies along the central axis of the coils. The coils are switched on and off in a precisely timed sequence, causing the projectile to be accelerated quickly along the barrel via magnetic forces.

Coilguns are distinct from railguns, as the direction of acceleration in a railgun is at right angles to the central axis of the current loop formed by the conducting rails. In addition, railguns usually require the use of sliding contacts to pass a large current through the projectile or sabot, but coilguns do not necessarily require sliding contacts. While some simple coilgun concepts can use ferromagnetic projectiles or even permanent magnet projectiles, most designs for high velocities actually incorporate a coupled coil as part of the projectile.

Coilguns are also distinct from Gauss guns, although many works of science fiction have erroneously confused the two. A coil gun uses electromagnetic acceleration whereas Gauss guns predate the idea of coil guns and instead consists of ferromagnets using a configuration similar to a Newton's Cradle to impart acceleration.

== History ==
The oldest electromagnetic gun came in the form of the coilgun, the first of which was invented by Norwegian scientist Kristian Birkeland at the University of Kristiania (today Oslo). The invention was officially patented in 1904, although its development reportedly started as early as 1845. According to his accounts, Birkeland accelerated a 500-gram projectile to approximately 50 metres per second (160 ft/s).

In 1933, Texan inventor Virgil Rigsby developed a stationary coil gun that was designed to be used similarly to a machine gun. It was powered by a large electrical motor and generator. It appeared in many contemporary science publications, but never piqued the interest of any armed forces.

== Construction ==
There are two main types or setups of a coilgun: single-stage and multistage. A single-stage coilgun uses one electromagnetic coil to propel a projectile. A multistage coilgun uses several electromagnetic coils in succession to progressively increase the speed of the projectile.

=== Ferromagnetic projectiles ===
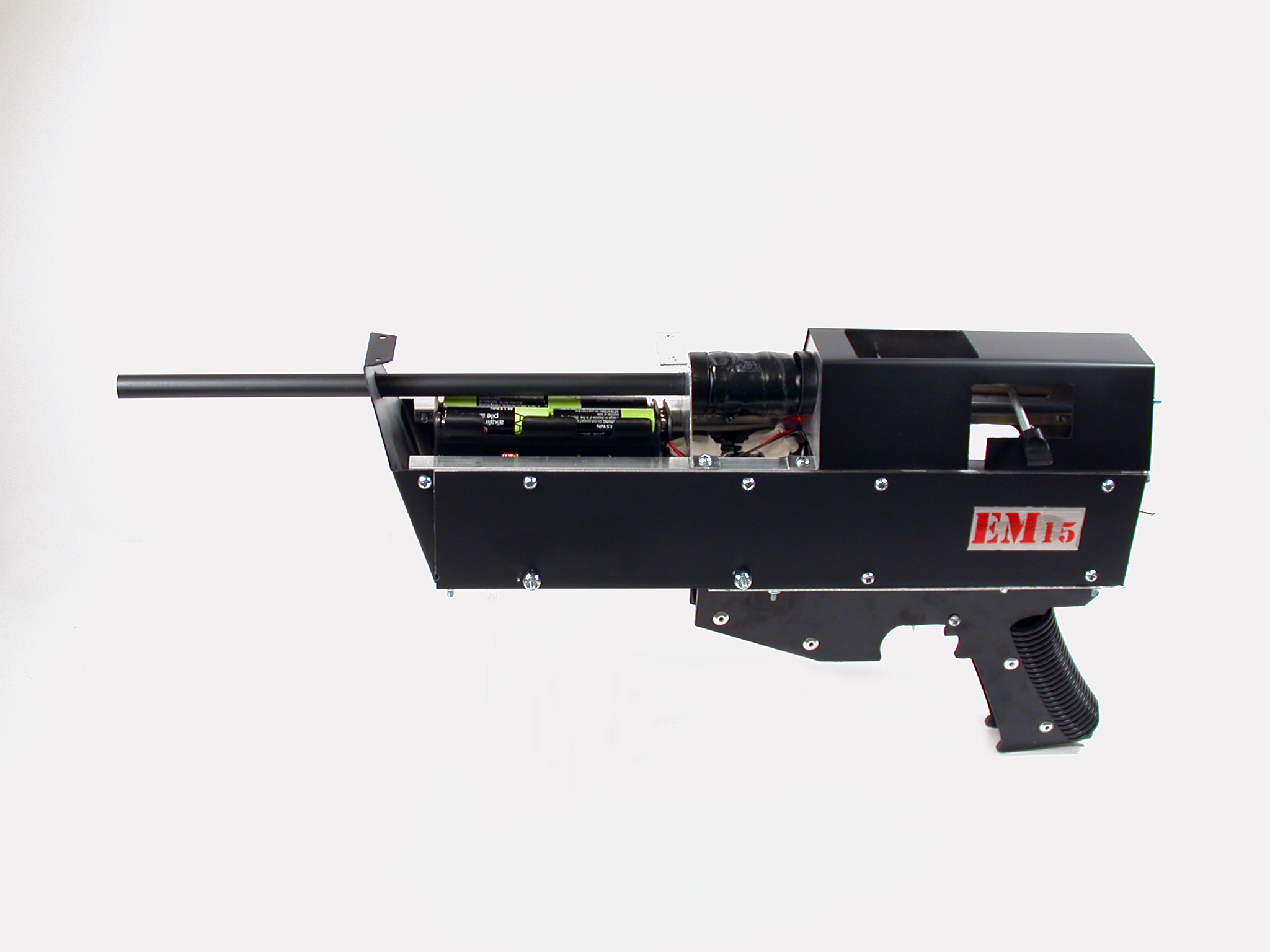
A single stage coilgun

For ferromagnetic projectiles, a single-stage coilgun can be formed by a coil of wire, an electromagnet, with a ferromagnetic projectile placed at one of its ends. This type of coilgun is formed like the solenoid used in an electromechanical relay, i.e. a current-carrying coil which will draw a ferromagnetic object through its center. A large current is pulsed through the coil of wire and a strong magnetic field forms, pulling the projectile to the center of the coil. When the projectile nears this point the electromagnet must be switched off, to prevent the projectile from becoming arrested at the center of the electromagnet.

In a multistage design, further electromagnets are then used to repeat this process, progressively accelerating the projectile. In common coilgun designs, the "barrel" of the gun is made up of a track that the projectile rides on, with the driver into the magnetic coils around the track. Power is supplied to the electromagnet from some sort of fast discharge storage device, typically a battery, or capacitors (one per electromagnet), designed for fast energy discharge. A diode is used to protect polarity sensitive components (such as semiconductors or electrolytic capacitors) from damage due to inverse polarity of the voltage after turning off the coil.

Many hobbyists use low-cost rudimentary designs to experiment with coilguns, for example using photoflash capacitors from a disposable camera, or a capacitor from a standard cathode-ray tube television as the energy source, and a low inductance coil to propel the projectile forward.

=== Non-ferromagnetic projectiles ===
Some designs have non-ferromagnetic projectiles, of materials such as aluminium or copper, with the armature of the projectile acting as an electromagnet with internal current induced by pulses of the acceleration coils. A superconducting coilgun called a quench gun could be created by successively quenching a line of adjacent coaxial superconducting coils forming a gun barrel, generating a wave of magnetic field gradient traveling at any desired speed. A traveling superconducting coil might be made to ride this wave like a surfboard. The device would be a mass driver or linear synchronous motor with the propulsion energy stored directly in the drive coils. Another method would have non-superconducting acceleration coils and propulsion energy stored outside them but a projectile with superconducting magnets.

Though the cost of power switching and other factors can limit projectile energy, a notable benefit of some coilgun designs over simpler railguns is avoiding an intrinsic velocity limit from hypervelocity physical contact and erosion. By having the projectile pulled towards or levitated within the center of the coils as it is accelerated, no physical friction with the walls of the bore occurs. If the bore is a total vacuum (such as a tube with a plasma window), there is no friction at all, which helps prolong the period of reusability.

=== Switching ===
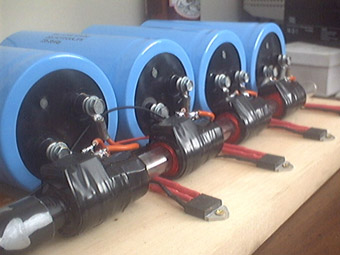
A multistage coilgun

One main obstacle in coilgun design is switching the power through the coils. There are several common solutions—the simplest (and probably least effective) is the spark gap, which releases the stored energy through the coil when the voltage reaches a certain threshold. A better option is to use solid-state switches; these include IGBTs or power MOSFETs (which can be switched off mid-pulse) and SCRs (which release all stored energy before turning off).

A quick-and-dirty method for switching, especially for those using a flash camera for the main components, is to use the flash tube itself as a switch. By wiring it in series with the coil, it can silently and non-destructively (assuming that the energy in the capacitor is kept below the tube's safe operating limits) allow a large amount of current to pass through to the coil. Like any flash tube, ionizing the gas in the tube with a high voltage triggers it. However, a large amount of the energy will be dissipated as heat and light, and, because of the tube being a spark gap, the tube will stop conducting once the voltage across it drops sufficiently, leaving some charge remaining on the capacitor.

=== Resistance ===
The electrical resistance of the coils and the equivalent series resistance (ESR) of the current source dissipate considerable power.

At low speeds the heating of the coils dominates the efficiency of the coilgun, giving exceptionally low efficiency. However, as speeds climb, mechanical power grows proportional to the square of the speed, but, correctly switched, the resistive losses are largely unaffected, and thus these resistive losses become much smaller in percentage terms.

=== Magnetic circuit ===
Ideally, 100% of the magnetic flux generated by the coil would be delivered to and act on the projectile; in reality this is impossible due to energy losses always present in a real system, which cannot be eliminated.

With a simple air-cored solenoid, the majority of the magnetic flux is not coupled into the projectile because of the magnetic circuit's high reluctance. The uncoupled flux generates a magnetic field that stores energy in the surrounding air. The energy that is stored in this field does not simply disappear from the magnetic circuit once the capacitor finishes discharging, instead returning to the coilgun's electric circuit. Because the coilgun's electric circuit is inherently analogous to an LC oscillator, the unused energy returns in the reverse direction ('ringing'), which can seriously damage polarized capacitors such as electrolytic capacitors.

Reverse charging can be prevented by a diode connected in reverse-parallel across the capacitor terminals; as a result, the current keeps flowing until the diode and the coil's resistance dissipate the field energy as heat. While this is a simple and frequently utilized solution, it requires an additional expensive high-power diode and a well-designed coil with enough thermal mass and heat dissipation capability in order to prevent component failure.

Some designs attempt to recover the energy stored in the magnetic field by using a pair of diodes. These diodes, instead of being forced to dissipate the remaining energy, recharge the capacitors with the right polarity for the next discharge cycle. This will also avoid the need to fully recharge the capacitors, thus significantly reducing charge times. However, the practicality of this solution is limited by the resulting high recharge current through the equivalent series resistance (ESR) of the capacitors; the ESR will dissipate some of the recharge current, generating heat within the capacitors and potentially shortening their lifetime.

To reduce component size, weight, durability requirements, and most importantly, cost, the magnetic circuit must be optimized to deliver more energy to the projectile for a given energy input. This has been addressed to some extent by the use of back iron and end iron, which are pieces of magnetic material that enclose the coil and create paths of lower reluctance in order to improve the amount of magnetic flux coupled into the projectile. Results can vary widely, depending on the materials used; hobbyist designs may use, for example, materials ranging anywhere from magnetic steel (more effective, lower reluctance) to video tape (little improvement in reluctance). Moreover, the additional pieces of magnetic material in the magnetic circuit can potentially exacerbate the possibility of flux saturation and other magnetic losses.

=== Ferromagnetic projectile saturation ===
Another significant limitation of the coilgun is the occurrence of magnetic saturation in the ferromagnetic projectile. When the flux in the projectile lies in the linear portion of its material's B(H) curve, the force applied to the core is proportional to the square of coil current (I)—the field (H) is linearly dependent on I, B is linearly dependent on H and force is linearly dependent on the product BI. This relationship continues until the core is saturated; once this happens B will only increase marginally with H (and thus with I), so force gain is linear. Since losses are proportional to I^{2}, increasing current beyond this point eventually decreases efficiency although it may increase the force. This puts an absolute limit on how much a given projectile can be accelerated with a single stage at acceptable efficiency.

=== Projectile magnetization and reaction time ===
Apart from saturation, the B(H) dependency often contains a hysteresis loop and the reaction time of the projectile material may be significant. The hysteresis means that the projectile becomes permanently magnetized and some energy will be lost as a permanent magnetic field of the projectile. The projectile reaction time, on the other hand, makes the projectile reluctant to respond to abrupt B changes; the flux will not rise as fast as desired while current is applied and a B tail will occur after the coil field has disappeared. This delay decreases the force, which would be maximized if the H and B were in phase.

== Induction coilguns ==
Most of the work to develop coilguns as hyper-velocity launchers has used "air-cored" systems to get around the limitations associated with ferromagnetic projectiles. In these systems, the projectile is accelerated by a moving coil "armature". If the armature is configured as one or more "shorted turns" then induced currents will result as a consequence of the time variation of the current in the static launcher coil (or coils).

In principle, coilguns can also be constructed in which the moving coils are fed with current via sliding contacts. However, the practical construction of such arrangements requires the provision of reliable high speed sliding contacts. Although feeding current to a multi-turn coil armature might not require currents as large as those required in a railgun, the elimination of the need for high speed sliding contacts is an obvious potential advantage of the induction coilgun relative to the railgun.

Air cored systems also introduce the penalty that much higher currents may be needed than in an "iron cored" system. Ultimately though, subject to the provision of appropriately rated power supplies, air cored systems can operate with much greater magnetic field strengths than "iron cored" systems, so that, ultimately, much higher accelerations and forces should be possible.

== Formula for exit velocity of coilgun projectile ==
An approximate result for the exit velocity of a projectile having been accelerated by a single-stage coilgun can be obtained by the equation

$v_{exit}=\sqrt{\frac{2}{m}{V\mu_0\chi_mn^2I^2}}$

m being the mass of the projectile, defined as kg

V being the volume of the projectile, defined as m^{3}

μ_{0} being the vacuum permeability, defined in SI units as 4π × 10^{−7} V·s/(A·m)

χ_{m} being the magnetic susceptibility of the projectile, a dimensionless proportionality constant indicating the degree of magnetization in a material in response to applied magnetic fields. This often must be determined experimentally, and tables containing susceptibility values for certain materials may be found in the CRC Handbook of Chemistry and Physics as well as the Wikipedia article for magnetic susceptibility

n being the number of coil turns per unit length of the coil, defined as m^{−1}

And I being the current passing through the coil, defined as A.

While this approximation is useful for quickly defining the upper limit of velocity in a coilgun system, more accurate and non-linear second order differential equations do exist. The issues with this formula are that it assumes the projectile lies completely within a uniform magnetic field, that the current dies out instantly once the projectile reaches the center of the coil (eliminating the possibility of coil suck-back), that all potential energy is transferred into kinetic energy (whereas most would go into frictional forces), and that the wires of the coil are infinitely thin and do not stack on one another, all cumulatively increasing the expected exit velocity.

== Uses ==
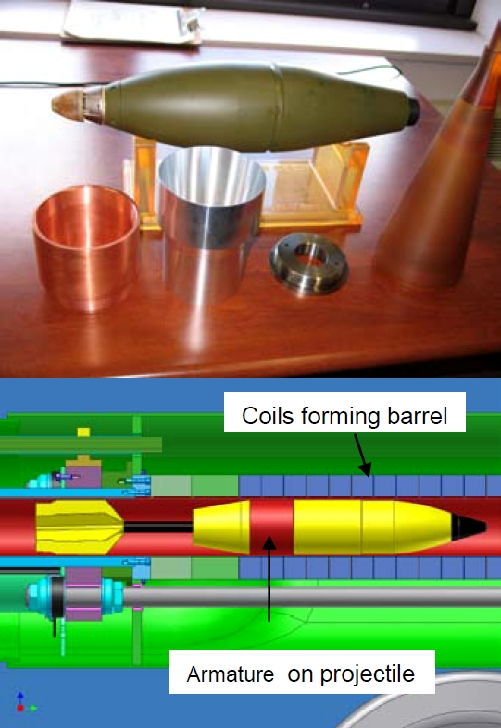
A M934 mortar round is adapted for experimental coilgun launch with a conformal armature tail kit, to be fired through a barrel composed of short solenoidal electromagnets stacked end to end

Small coilguns are recreationally made by hobbyists, typically up to several joules to tens of joules projectile energy (the latter comparable to a typical air gun and an order of magnitude less than a firearm) while ranging from under one percent to several percent efficiency.

In 2018, a Los Angeles-based company Arcflash Labs offered the first coilgun for sale to the general public, the EMG-01A. It fired 6-gram steel slugs at 45 m/s with a muzzle energy of approximately 5 joules. In 2021, they developed a larger model, the GR-1 Gauss rifle which fired 30-gram steel slugs at up to 75 m/s with a muzzle energy of approximately 85 joules, comparable to a PCP air rifle.

In 2022 Northshore Sports Club, an American gun club in Lake Forest, Illinois began distributing the CS/LW21, also referred to as the "E-Shotgun", a compact, 15 joule magazine fed coil gun, manufactured by the China North Industries Group Corp. They project distribution to reach 5000 units per year in the US, and the manufacturer has also unveiled plans to supply the Chinese police and military with units for "non-lethal riot control".

Much higher efficiency and energy can be obtained with designs of greater expense and sophistication. In 1978, Bondaletov in the USSR achieved record acceleration with a single stage by sending a 2-gram ring to 5000 m/s in 1 cm of length, but the most efficient modern designs tend to involve many stages. It is estimated that greater than 90% efficiency will be required for vastly larger superconducting systems for space launch. An experimental 45-stage, 2.1 m long DARPA coilgun mortar design is 22% efficient, with 1.6 megajoules kinetic energy delivered to a round.

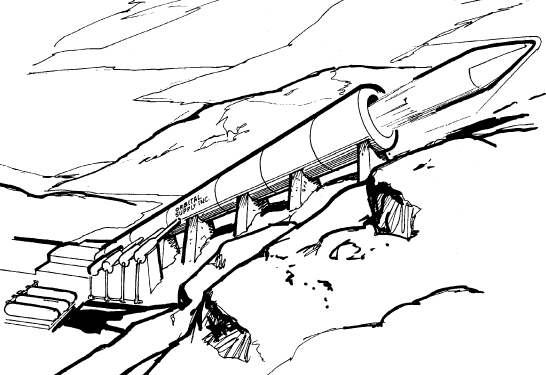
A large coilgun concept, a coaxial electromagnetic launcher firing projectiles to orbit

Though they face the challenge of competitiveness versus conventional guns (and sometimes railgun alternatives), coilguns are being researched for weaponry.

The DARPA Electromagnetic Mortar program is one example, if practical challenges like sufficiently low weight can be achieved. The coilgun would be relatively silent with no smoke giving away its position, though a supersonic projectile would still create a sonic boom. Adjustable, smooth acceleration of the projectile along the barrel length would allow higher velocity, with a predicted range increase of 30% for a 120mm EM mortar over the conventional version of similar length. With no separate propellant charges to load, the researchers envision the firing rate to approximately double.

In 2006, a 120mm prototype was under construction for evaluation, though a tenuous time for deployment was then estimated to be 5 to 10+ years by Sandia National Laboratories. In 2011, development was proposed for an 81mm coilgun mortar to operate with a hybrid-electric version of the future Joint Light Tactical Vehicle.

Electromagnetic aircraft catapults are planned, including on board future U.S. Gerald R. Ford class aircraft carriers. An experimental induction coilgun version of an Electromagnetic Missile Launcher (EMML) has been tested for launching Tomahawk missiles. A coilgun-based active defense system for tanks is under development at HIT in China.

Coilgun potential has been perceived as extending beyond military applications.

Few entities could overcome the challenges and corresponding capital investment to fund gigantic coilguns with projectile mass and velocity on the scale of gigajoules of kinetic energy (as opposed to megajoules or less). Such have been proposed as Earth or Moon launchers:

- An ambitious lunar-base proposal considered in a 1975 NASA study would have involved a 4000-ton coilgun sending 10 million tons of lunar material over several years to L5 in support of massive space colonization utilizing a large 9900-ton power plant).
- A 1992 NASA study calculated that a 330-ton lunar quench gun (superconducting coilgun) could launch 4400 projectiles annually, each 1.5 tons and mostly liquid oxygen payload, using a relatively small amount of power, 350 kW average.
- After a NASA Ames study of aerothermal requirements for heat shields with terrestrial surface launch, Sandia National Laboratories investigated electromagnetic launchers for spacecraft and researched other EML applications using both railguns and coilguns. In 1990 a kilometer-long coilgun was proposed for launch of small satellites.
- Later investigations at Sandia included a 2005 proposal of the StarTram concept for an extremely long coilgun, one version conceived as launching passengers to orbit with survivable acceleration.

== See also ==
- Electromagnetic gun
- Electromagnetic propulsion
- Carl Friedrich Gauss
- Helical railgun
- Light-gas gun
- Mass driver
- Edwin Fitch Northrup
- Plasma railgun
- Railgun
- Ram accelerator
- Solenoid
- Tubular linear motor
