= Gauss gun =

Device that uses magnets and impacts to launch a projectile

The Gauss gun (often called a Gauss rifle or Gauss cannon) is a device that uses electromagnets and the physics of the Newton's cradle to accelerate a projectile. Gauss guns are distinct from and predate coil guns, although many works of science fiction (and occasionally educators) have confused the two. Typical use of the Gauss rifle is to demonstrate the effects of energy and momentum transfer, however, self-assembling microbots based on the principle have been proposed for tissue penetration.

== Mechanism ==
Operation of the simplest Gauss gun (colored ball is the magnet)

In its frequent incarnation as a physics demonstration, a Gauss gun usually consists of series of ferromagnetic balls on a nonmagnetic track. On the track is a permanent magnet with a ball, the projectile, stuck to the front of it. Between the projectile and the magnet is a spacer, usually consisting of one or more additional balls. Yet another ball, the trigger ball, is released from behind the magnet. It is attracted to and accelerates toward the magnet. When it strikes the back of the magnet, it transfers its momentum to the projectile ball, which is knocked off the front of the stack, as in a Newton's cradle. Because the spacer kept it far away from the magnet, the projectile loses less energy escaping from the magnet's influence than the trigger ball gave it, so it leaves the stack with a higher velocity than the trigger ball entered with.

Once the ball is launched, the trigger ball must be removed from the back of the magnet before it can be used again. This is where the energy to shoot the gun ultimately comes from.

Multi-stage Gauss guns are also possible, with the projectile of each stage becoming the trigger for the next, carrying its energy forward so that each stage contributes energy to the final projectile.

== See also ==
- Electromagnetic gun
- Newton's Cradle
- List of science demonstrations
- Galilean cannon
- Carl Friedrich Gauss

== Sources ==
- Meredith, Dawn C.; Redish, Edward F. (2013-07-01). "Reinventing physics for life-sciences majors". Physics Today. 66 (7): 38–43. Bibcode:2013PhT....66g..38M. doi:10.1063/PT.3.2046. ISSN 0031-9228.
