= Photoflash capacitor =

High-voltage capacitor used in photographic flashes

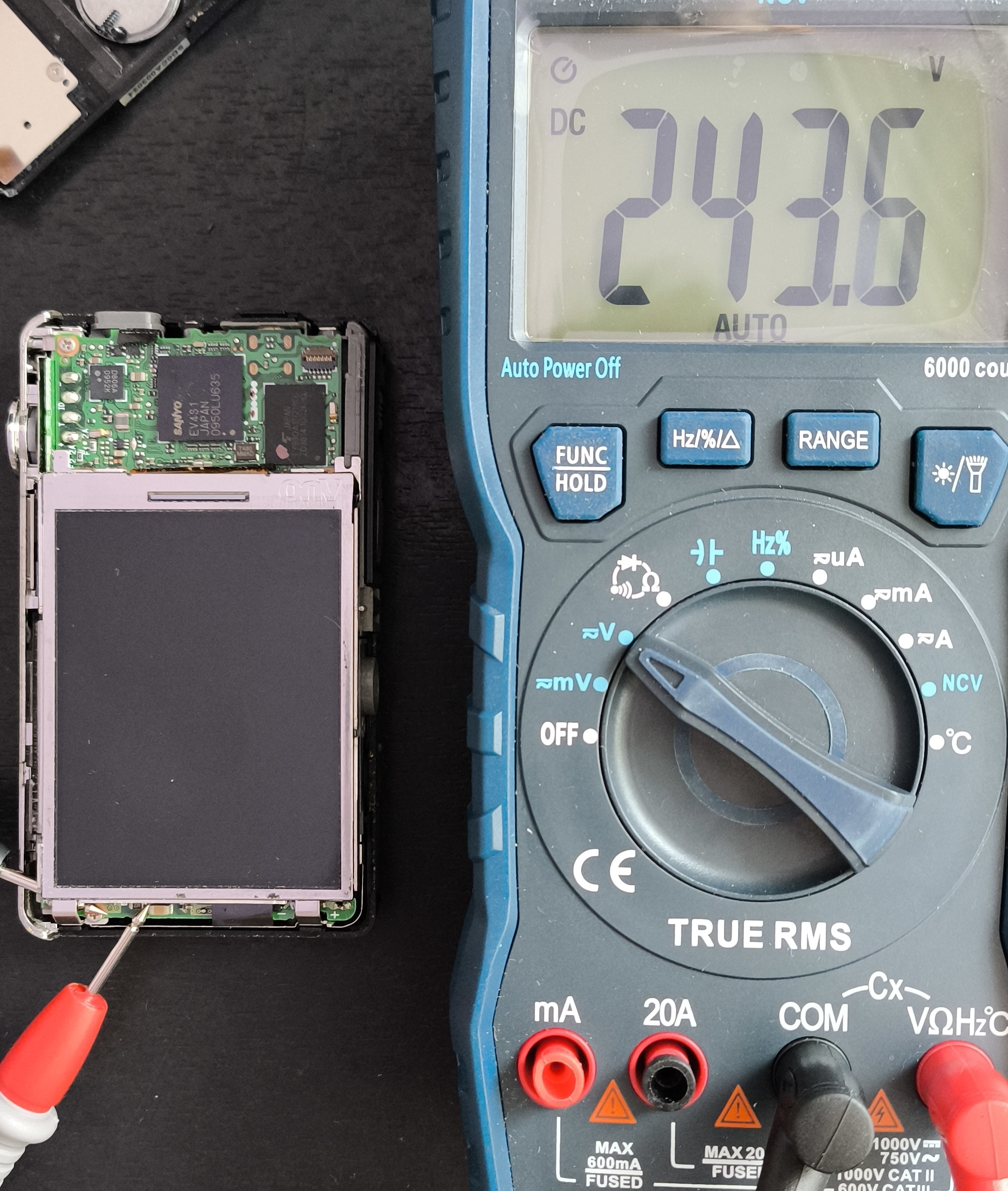
Voltage of a photoflash capacitor in a digital camera, mounted behind its PCB and LCD.

A photoflash capacitor is a high-voltage electrolytic capacitor used in camera flashes and in solid-state laser power supplies. Their usual purpose is to briefly power a flash lamp, used to illuminate a photographic subject or optically pump a laser rod. As flash tubes require very high current for a very short time to operate, photoflash capacitors are designed to supply high discharge current pulses without excessive internal heating.

== Fundamentals ==
The principal properties of a capacitor are capacitance, working voltage, equivalent series resistance (ESR), equivalent series inductance (ESL), and working temperature.

Compared with electrolytic capacitors usually used for power supply filtering at power frequency, a photoflash capacitor is designed to have lower ESR, ESL, and capacitance manufacturing tolerance, but does not need as high a working temperature.

== Design ==
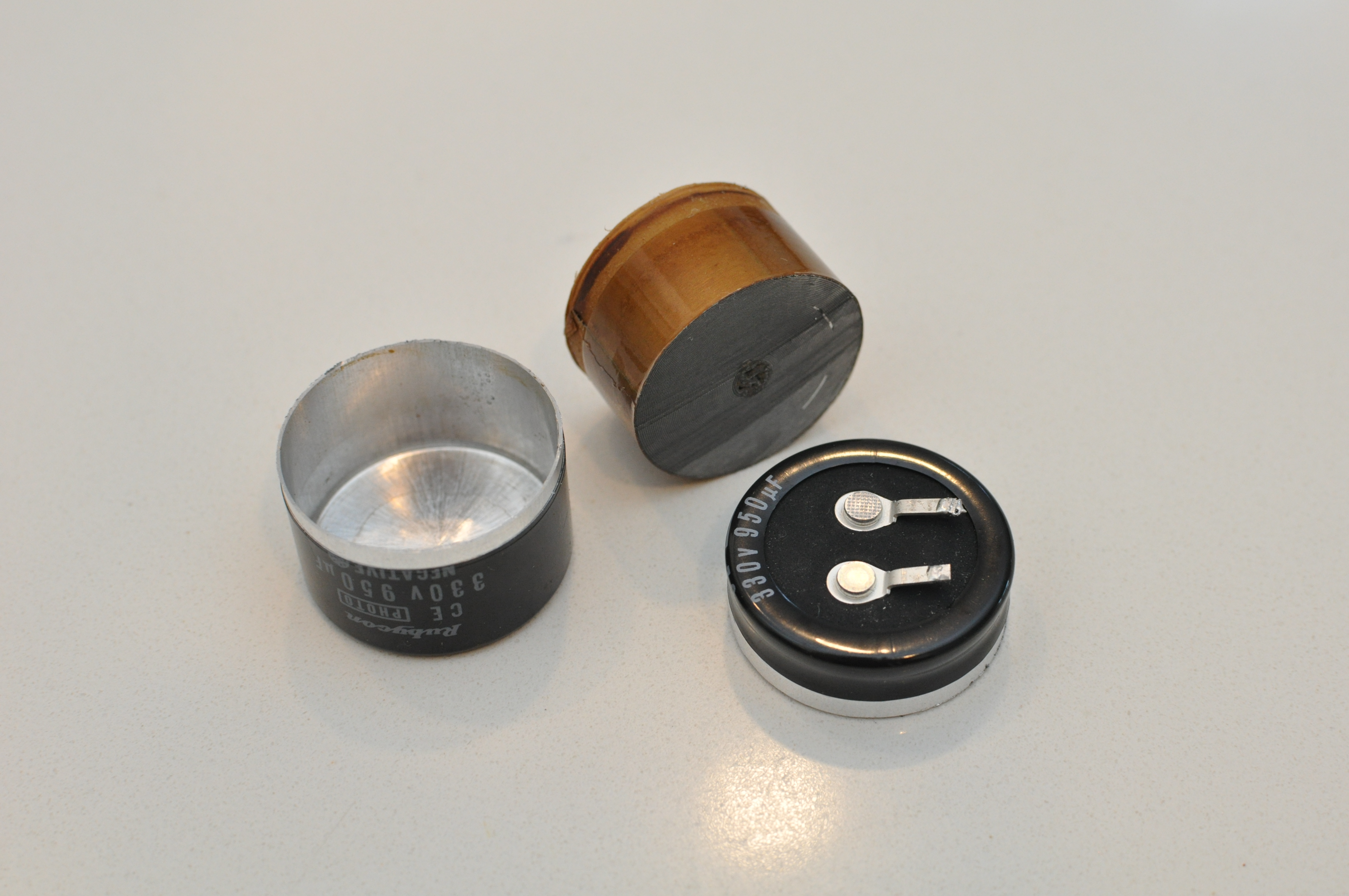
A photo capacitor unit used in modern xenon flash units

The light energy emitted by a flash is supplied by the capacitor, and is proportional to the product of the capacitance and the voltage squared; photoflash capacitors may have capacitance in the range 80-240 microfarads (μF) and voltages from 180 to 330 volts for flash units built into small disposable and compact cameras, increasing for units delivering higher light energy. A typical manufacturer's range includes capacitors operating at 330–380V, with capacitance from 80 to 1,500 μF While normal electrolytic capacitors are often operated at not more than half their nominal voltage due to their high derating, photoflash capacitors are typically operated at their nominal working voltage (labelled as "WV" or "W.V." rather than just "V").

Photoflash capacitors are not subject to the high temperatures of cased electronic equipment in continuous operation, with nearby components and sometimes the capacitors themselves dissipating heat; they are often rated at a maximum operating temperature rate of typically 55 °C, compared to 85 °C–105 °C or more for capacitors for continuous use in electronic equipment. In most electronic applications an electrolytic capacitor can have a capacitance much larger than its nominal value without detracting from circuit performance; general-purpose electrolytics are often specified to have capacitance between 20% below and 80% above rated value, although tighter tolerances are available. The light energy of a flash is proportional to the capacitance and large variations are not acceptable, typical tolerance is -10+20%.

Photoflash capacitors are designed to deliver a brief pulse of very high current, and are consequently sometimes used in railgun and coilgun designs.
