= Arcflash Labs =

American electromagnetic accelerator company

- Company type: Private, C-Corp
- Industry: Electronics
- Predecessor: Arcflash Labs, LLC
- Founded: August 1, 2017; 7 years ago in Los Angeles, USA
- Founders: David M. Wirth, Jason Murray
- Headquarters: Phoenix, Arizona, United States
- Products: Electromagnetic Accelerators, Pulsed Power Supplies
- Number of employees: 5
- Website: www.arcflashlabs.com

Arcflash Labs, Inc. is an American technology company which specializes in the research and development of high energy pulsed power supplies, and applications for such devices. Its headquarters is located in Phoenix, Arizona and the company was founded in 2017 by David M. Wirth and Jason Murray, both aerospace engineers and former USAF officers. In 2018, the company developed and sold the first commercially viable electromagnetic accelerator, the EMG-01A, and in 2021 released the GR-1 "Anvil", the first coilgun with comparable energy to a firearm. Their core innovation was the clamped quasi-resonant (CQR) inverter, which allowed for the development and rapid charging of hand-held coilguns.

== History ==
In 2010, Jason Murray developed the first truly portable high energy coilgun, the CG-33, which was followed shortly by his development of a fully automatic handheld coilgun, the CG-42 in 2013. Working independently, David M. Wirth developed the first hand-held railgun, the XPR-1 in 2015. Shortly following this innovation, the two inventors partnered to form Arcflash Labs. Within a year, the founders established the company and offered their first coilgun, the EMG-01A for sale, and in 2020 filed a patent on the power supply that would later become the core of the GR-1. In 2022 they released an iteration on their technology the EMG-02 coilgun which was able to fire with higher energy, and which used commercial drill batteries as a power source.
