= Pendulum wave =

Type of physics demonstration

Front view
(half-speed)

Top view
(half-speed)

SVG animation of a pendulum wave with 12 pendulums, the lowest pendulum making 60 oscillations in one minute, the next 61, and so forth – in the animations, tap or hover over a pendulum to pause

A pendulum wave is an elementary physics demonstration and kinetic art comprising a number of uncoupled simple pendulums with monotonically increasing lengths. As the pendulums oscillate, they appear to produce travelling and standing waves, beating, and random motion.

== History ==
Ernst Mach designed and constructed the first pendulum wave demonstration around 1867 at Charles-Ferdinand University in Prague. In the Czech Republic, the demonstration is called Mach's wave machine. Eric J. Heller at Harvard University suggested the use of the demonstration to simulate quantum revival.

In 2001, two University of Minnesota Morris researchers have derived a continuous function explaining the patterns in the pendulums using an extension to the equation for traveling waves in one dimension, and showed that their cycling arises from aliasing of the underlying continuous function.

In 2020, illusionist Kevin McMahon, incorporated a massive pendulum wave apparatus, supposedly with flaming cannonballs, as a stunt in Britain's Got Talent (series 14) under the stage name Kevin Quantum.

== Design ==
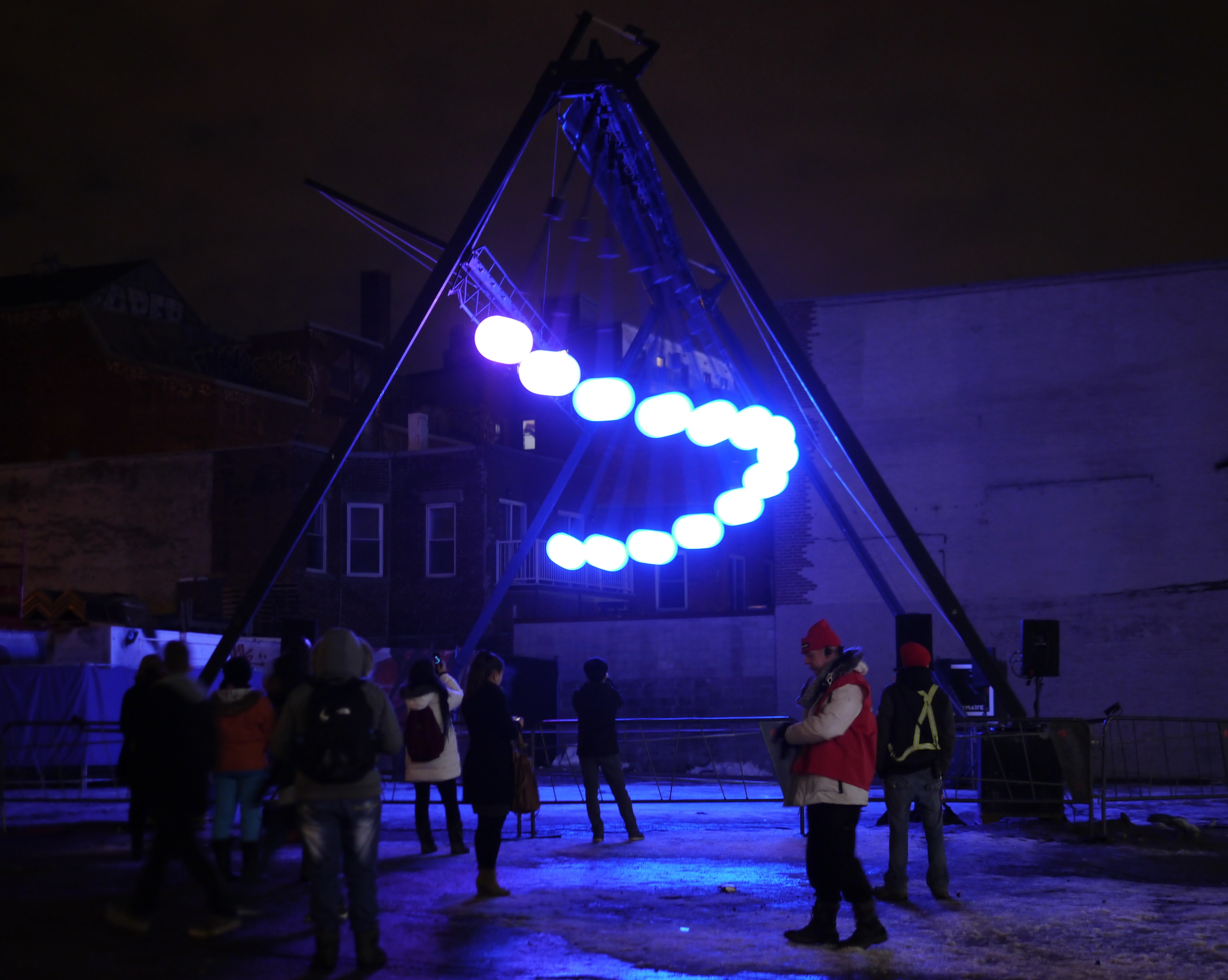
A pendulum wave art installation

The lengths of the pendulums are set such that in a given time t, the first pendulum completes n oscillations, and each subsequent one completes one more oscillation than the previous. As all pendulums are started together, their relative phases change continuously, but after time t, they come back in sync and the sequence repeats.

For small perturbations, the period of a pendulum is given by

$$T = 2 \pi \sqrt{ \frac{L}{g} }$$

where L is the length of the pendulum and g is the standard acceleration due to gravity.

As t/n is the period of a pendulum completing n oscillations in t,

$$\begin{align}
\frac{t}{n}  & = 2 \pi \sqrt{ \frac{L}{g} } \\
\therefore L & = g \Big( \frac{t}{2 \pi n} \Big)^2 \\
\end{align}$$

A common choice of t is 60 seconds. Thus, for g ≈ 9.8 ms^{−2},

$$L \approx \frac{894}{n^2} \; \text{m}$$

n	T (s)	L (m)
71	0.846	0.177
70	0.857	0.182
69	0.870	0.188
68	0.882	0.193
67	0.896	0.199
66	0.909	0.205
65	0.923	0.212
64	0.938	0.218
63	0.952	0.225
62	0.968	0.232
61	0.984	0.240
60	1.000	0.248

Parameters of the
pendulum wave in
the animation above

Timeline of the pendulum wave in the animation above

== See also ==
- Newton's cradle – a set of pendulums constrained to swing along the axis of the apparatus and collide with one another
