= Spaghetti bridge =

Bridge made of uncooked noodles

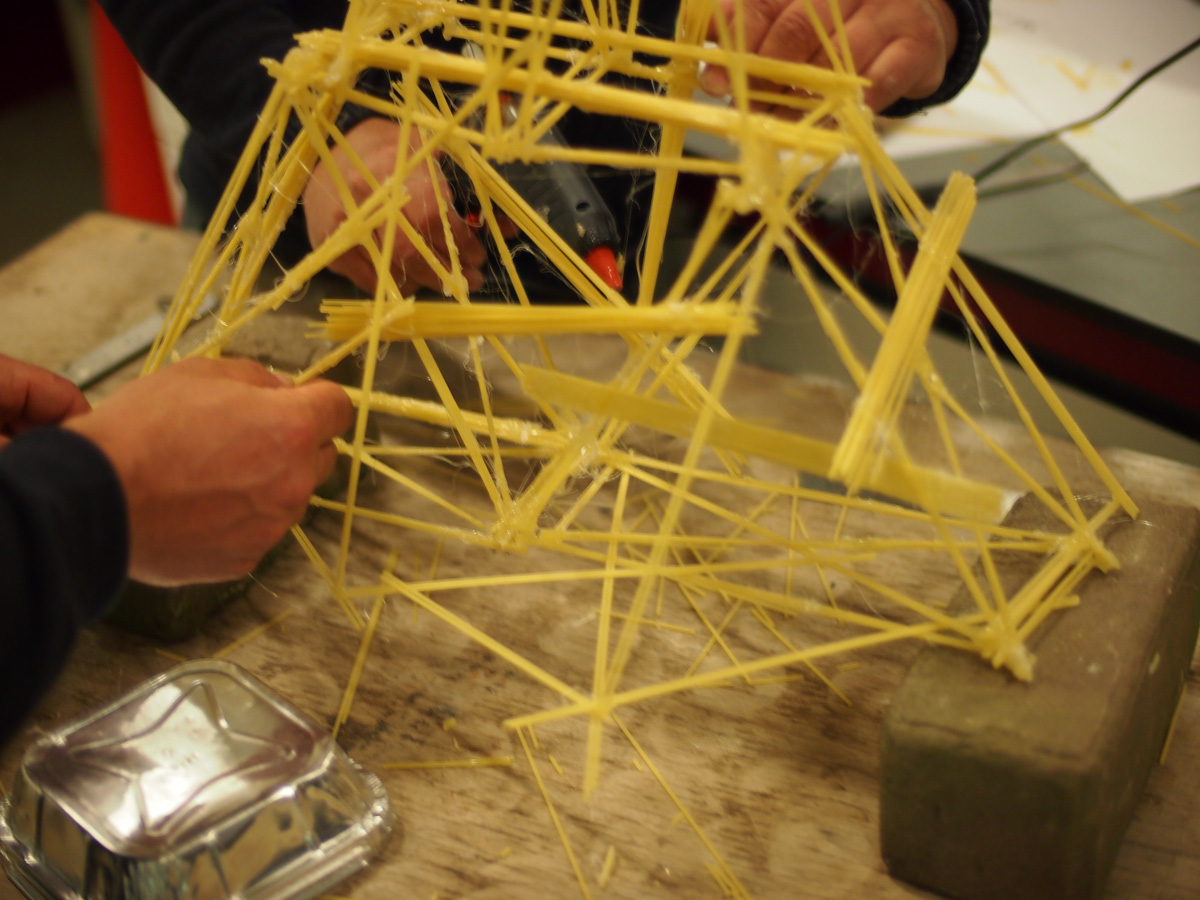
A spaghetti bridge under construction

A spaghetti bridge is an architectural model of a bridge, made of uncooked spaghetti or other hard, dry, straight noodles. Bridges are constructed for both educational experiments and competitions. The aim is usually to construct a bridge with a specific quantity of materials over a specific span, that can sustain a load. In competitions, the bridge that can hold the greatest load for a short period of time wins the contest. There are many contests around the world, usually held by schools and colleges.

== Okanagan College contest ==
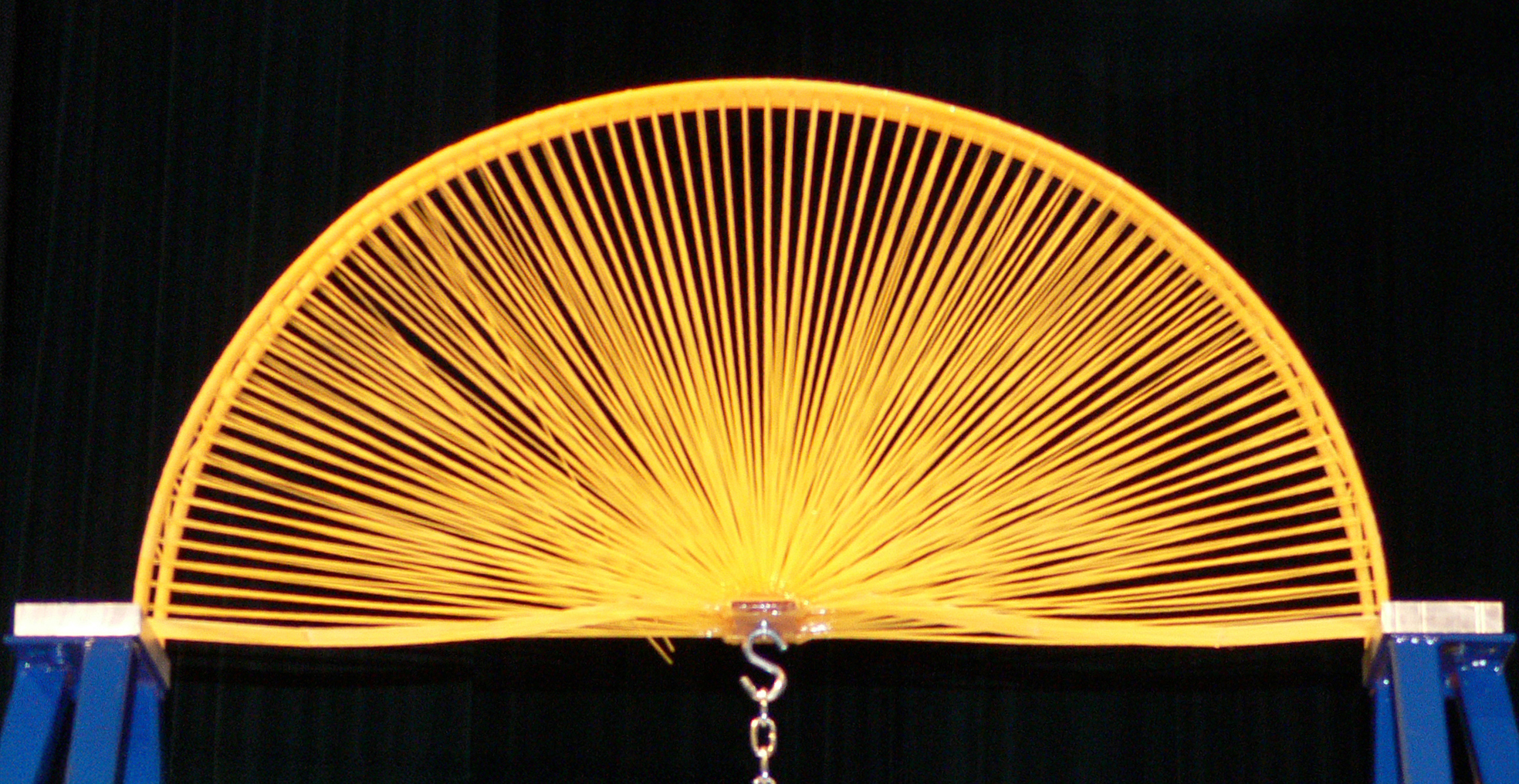
A spaghetti bridge being tested in the Okanagan College contest, with a weight attached

The original Spaghetti Bridge competition has run at Okanagan College in British Columbia since 1983, and is open to international entrants who are full-time secondary or post-secondary students.

The winners of the 2009 competition were Norbert Pozsonyi and Aliz Totivan of the Szechenyi Istvan University of Győr in Hungary. They won $1,500 with a bridge that weighed 982 grams and held 443.58 kg. Second place went to Brendon Syryda and Tyler Pearson of Okanagan College with a bridge that weighed 982 grams and held 98.71 kg.

== Contests ==
Spaghetti bridge building contests around the world include:

- Abbotsford School District
- Australian Maritime College
- Budapest Technical University
- Camosun College
- Coonabarabran High School
- Delft University of Technology
- Ferris State University
- George Brown College
- Institute of Machine Design and Security Technology
- Instituto GayLussac - Ensino Fundamental e Médio
- Universidade da Coruña, Escola Politécnica de Enxeñaría
- Italy High School
- James Cook University
- Johns Hopkins University
- McGill University
- Monash University
- Nathan Hale High School
- Okanagan College
- Riga Technical University
- Rowan University
- Technical University of Madrid
- Universidad del Valle de Guatemala
- Universidade Federal do Rio Grande do Sul
- University of Architecture, Civil Engineering and Geodesy
- University of British Columbia
- University of Business and Technology, Kosovo
- University of Maribor
- University of Salento
- University of South Australia
- University of Southern California
- University of Technology Sydney
- University of Tehran
- University of the Andes
- Vilnius Gediminas Technical University
- Winston Science
- Woodside Elementary School
- Bezalel Academy of Arts and Design
- Universidad de Buenos Aires - Facultad de Arquitectura Diseño y Urbanismo
- Instituto Federal de Educação, Ciência e Tecnologia de Santa Catarina - Joinville, Brazil

== See also ==
- Architectural engineering
- Balsa wood bridge
- Civil engineering
- Physics
- Problem-based learning
- Statics
- Truss
