= Physics Instructional Resource Association =

American association of physics education professionals and enthusiasts

- Location: United States

The Physics Instructional Association (PIRA) is an American association of physics education professionals and enthusiasts. Members are physics teachers, physics administrators, physics educational support staff and physics students. Interests cover all aspects of physics education with an emphasis on demonstrations, laboratories and outreach.

The association is also responsible for maintaining the Demonstration Classification Scheme (DCS), a standardized scheme for categorization of physics demonstrations.

== Affiliations ==
PIRA holds annual meetings during the summer meeting of the American Association of Physics Teachers. It is sponsored by the Apparatus Committee and annually hosts the Lecture Demonstration Workshop. PIRA assists or hosts the Physics Demonstrations Show at each summer meeting when the hosting institution requests.

== Demonstration bibliography ==
PIRA has continually updated the Demonstration Bibliography since its inception in the 1980s. It is based on a unique numbering system called the Demonstration Classification Scheme (DCS). The scheme originated from the demonstrations catalog used at the University of Minnesota.

PIRA has also generated a subset of this list called the PIRA 200. These 200 demonstrations are the recommended basic collection for any physics department.

== See also ==
- American Association of Physics Teachers
- Scientific demonstration
