= E-shotgun =

Chinese coilgun prototype

CS/LW21 "E-Shotgun"
- Type: Coilgun
- Place of origin: China

Production history
- Designer: Lei Fengqiao
- Manufacturer: China North Industries Group Corp
- Unit cost: Approx. $1,600 USD
- Produced: 2022–present

Specifications
- Mass: 7.5 pounds (3.4 kg)
- Length: 19 inches (48 cm)
- Barrel length: 10 inches (25 cm)
- Width: 2.1 inches (5.3 cm)
- Height: 7 inches (18 cm)
- Rate of fire: Up to 3000 rounds/min
- Muzzle velocity: Up to 45 m/s
- Effective firing range: 20 to 40 ft (6 to 12 m)
- Feed system: 25-round magazine (reversible for 50 total rounds)

The E-Shotgun, also referred to as the E-Gun, Northshore Sports Club CA-09, or the PD-90 Advanced Coilgun, is a hand-held automatic 9-stage coilgun designed by Lei Fengqiao and manufactured by China North Industries Group Corp in Xicheng District, Beijing, China (as well as "other technology teams"). In 2023, the CS/LW21 was commissioned by the Chinese government in order to "quell violent protests".

== Operating mechanism ==
The E-Shotgun uses a 20-cell, 80 volt, unbalanced lithium-ion polymer battery to supply up to roughly 16 kW of power to 9 solenoid drive coils. Unlike many coilguns, the E-shotgun does not require a solenoid injector and instead pulls armatures directly from the magazine at the breach using the first coil. The CS/LW21 operates at medium voltage via a direct battery connection and does not use an inverter or capacitor charging system, which allows the system to charge rapidly to achieve a high rate of fire (up to 3000 rounds per minute). The 9 coils are shaped around a slot-profile barrel and are radially asymmetrical to accelerate large disk-shaped armatures at up to 45 m/s. The disk shaped armatures facilitate a large magazine capacity and high energy transfer due to their large mass, but tumble in flight due to their lack of stabilization. The disks are also highly dependent on mass production and cannot be manufactured by users from readily available stock materials.

The shell of the weapon is manufactured from injection-molded polymer and the coils are mass produced with high uniformity between prototypes, further increasing reliability.
