= Office toy =

Novelty item typically placed on the desk of an office worker

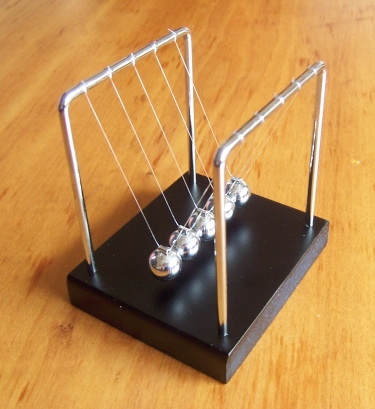
A Newton's cradle executive toy

An office toy (also known as an executive toy or a desk toy) is a novelty item typically placed on the desk of a corporate executive or other office worker. They have no work-related function, but are often intended to provide decoration or pleasure, relieve stress or inspire creativity. The Newton's cradle is a classic example of an office toy.

== Functions ==
Different types of office toys fulfill different needs for their users. Although providing pleasure and being decorative could be the two major functions in office toys, there are still some differences between each types of office toys. For example, puzzle-type toys can also help inspire creativity. A fidget spinner is an office toy that is used to reduce stress or boredom. Design curator Donald Albrecht described executive toys as "aspirational" objects, "less tools for provoking creativity than foghorns of identity and status in a sea of corporate homogeneity." Toys with corporate logos act as advertisements, such those distributed by pharmaceutical sales representatives in doctors' offices.

== Examples ==
- Drinking bird
- Fidget spinner
- Kinetic sand
- Lava lamp
- Magic 8 Ball
- Newton's cradle
- Pin Art
- Stress ball
- Useless machine
- Plasma globe
