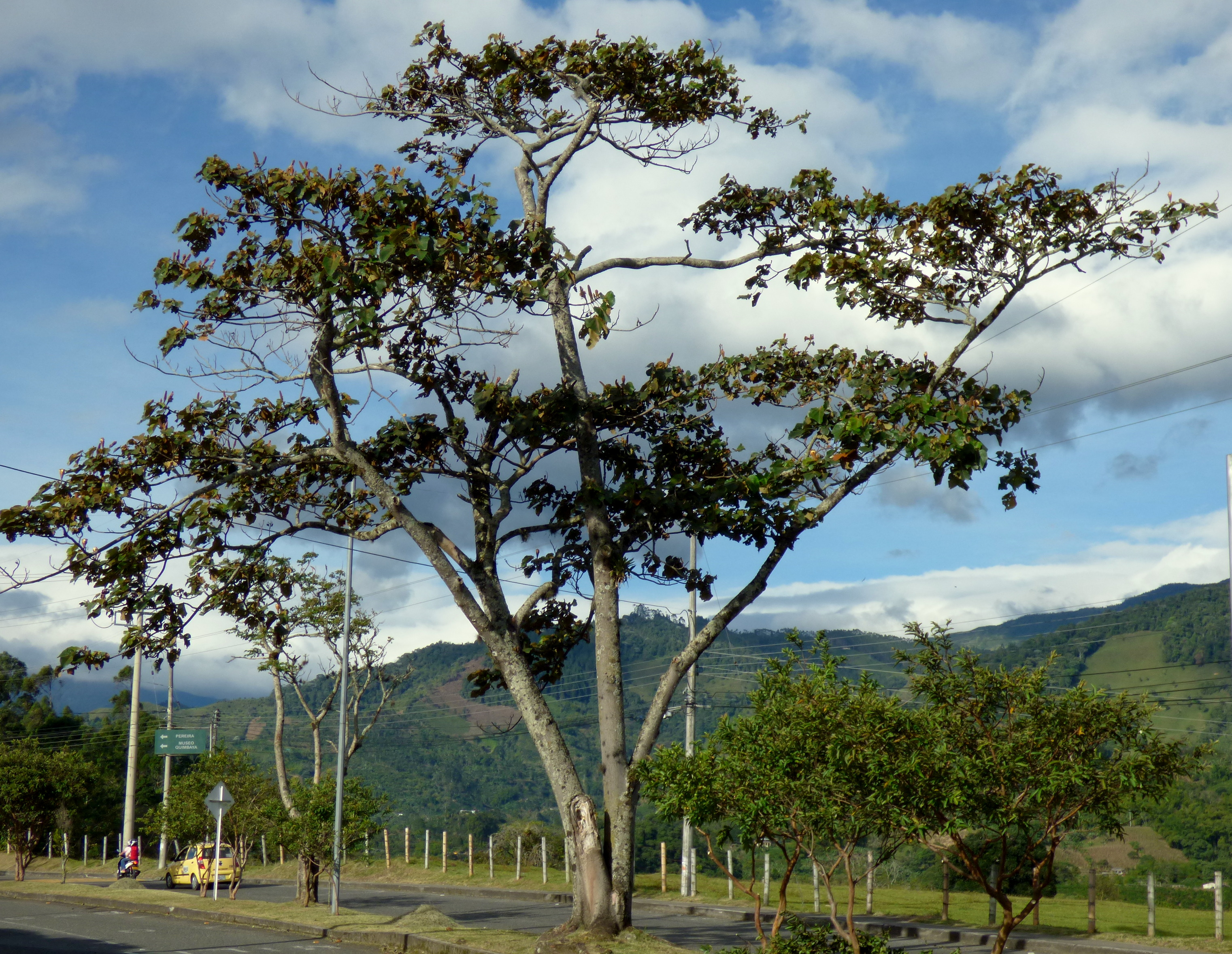
- Ochroma pyramidale in Colombia

Conservation status
- Least Concern (IUCN 3.1)

Scientific classification
- Kingdom: Plantae
- Clade: Tracheophytes
- Clade: Angiosperms
- Clade: Eudicots
- Clade: Rosids
- Order: Malvales
- Family: Malvaceae
- Subfamily: Bombacoideae
- Genus: Ochroma; Sw.
- Species: O. pyramidale

Binomial name
- Ochroma pyramidale (Cav. ex Lam.) Urb.

Synonyms
- Bombax pyramidale Cav. ex Lam. Ochroma bicolor Rowlee; Ochroma concolor Rowlee; Ochroma lagopus Sw. Ochroma obtusum Rowlee

= Ochroma =

Genus of trees

Ochroma pyramidale, commonly known as balsa, is a large, fast-growing tree native to the Americas. It is the sole member of the genus Ochroma, and is classified in the subfamily Bombacoideae of the mallow family Malvaceae. The tree is famous for its wide usage in woodworking, due to its softness and its high strength compared to its low density. The name balsa is the Spanish word for "raft" and the Portuguese word for ferry.

A deciduous angiosperm, Ochroma pyramidale can grow up to 30 metres (98 ft) tall, and is classified as a hardwood despite the wood itself being very soft; it is the softest commercial hardwood and is widely used because of its light weight.

Balsa trees grow extremely quickly, often up to 27 metres (89 ft) in 10–15 years, and do not usually live beyond 30 to 40 years. In terms of volume (as opposed to height) they may be the fastest growing tree known; Streets mentions one individual which grew 11.2 m (37 ft) tall and 17 cm (6.7 in) diameter at breast height during a period of fifteen months. Balsa, like most rainforest trees, does not make annual rings, but this growth is equivalent to rings 7 cm (2.8 in) wide. They are often cultivated in dense patches, with Ecuador supplying 95% or more of the commercial balsa. The wood from these trees is highly valuable due to its high strength-to-weight ratio, which is achieved through a kiln-drying process that leaves the wood's cells hollow and empty.

Balsa wood is popular for light, stiff structures in model bridge tests, model buildings, and construction of model aircraft. It is also used in wind turbine blades and in the manufacturing of wooden crankbaits for fishing, makeshift pens for calligraphy, composites, surfboards, boats, "breakaway" props for theatre and television, and even in the floor pans of the Chevrolet Corvette. Balsa wood played a historical role in Thor Heyerdahl's Kon-Tiki expedition, where it was used to build a raft. Balsa wood is also popular in arts such as whittling and in the making of baroque-style picture frames due to its ease of shaping.

== Biology ==
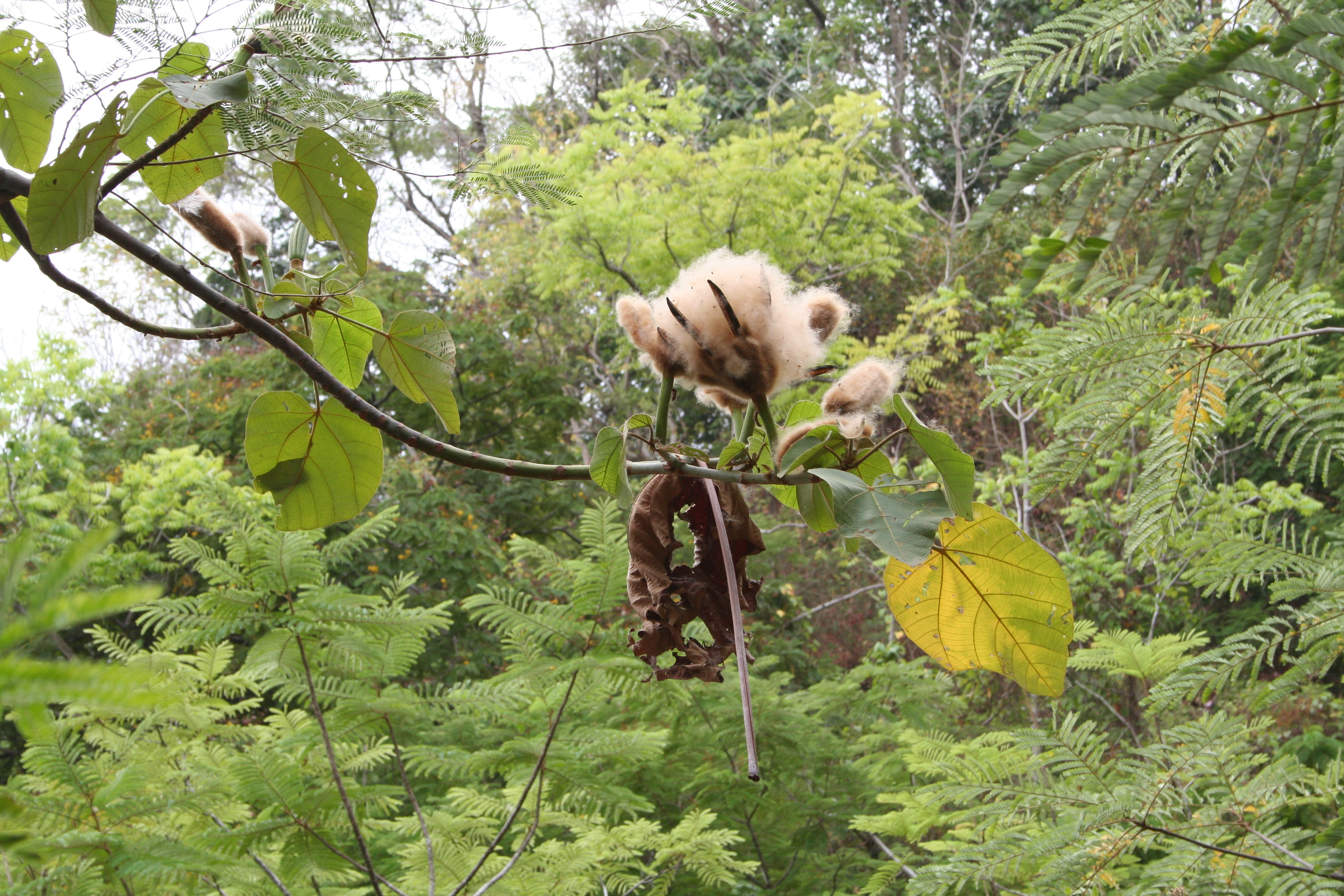
Balsa in Limbe Botanical Garden, Cameroon

A member of the mallow family, Ochroma pyramidale is native from southern Mexico to southern Brazil, but has been introduced to many other countries, including Papua New Guinea, Indonesia, Thailand, and the Solomon Islands. It is a pioneer plant, which establishes itself in clearings in forests, either man-made or where trees have fallen, or in abandoned agricultural fields. It grows extremely rapidly, up to 27 metres (90 ft) in 10–15 years. The speed of growth accounts for the lightness of the wood, which has a lower density than cork. Trees generally do not live beyond 30 to 40 years.

Flowers are produced from the third year onwards, typically at the end of the rainy season when few other trees are in flower. The large flowers, up to 20 cm (8 in) in diameter, open in the late afternoon and remain open overnight. Each may contain a pool of nectar up to 2.5 centimetres (1 in) deep. Daytime pollinators include capuchin monkeys. However, most pollination occurs at night; the main pollinators were once thought to be bats, but recent evidence suggests that two nocturnal arboreal mammals, the kinkajou and the olingo, may be the primary pollinators.

It is evergreen or dry-season deciduous, with large 30 to 40 centimetres (12 to 16 in), weakly palmately lobed leaves.

Being a deciduous angiosperm, balsa is classified as a hardwood despite the wood itself being very soft; it is the softest commercial hardwood.

== Cultivation ==
Ecuador supplies 70% or more of commercial balsa. In recent years, about 60% of the balsa has been plantation-grown in densely packed patches of around 1000 trees per hectare (400 per acre) (compared to about two to three per hectare/around one an acre in nature). The trees are harvested after six to ten years of growth in Ecuador. The remaining volume of balsa is harvested from plantations in Papua New Guinea; the climate is different, therefore harvesting occurs at 4-5 years of age.

== Uses ==
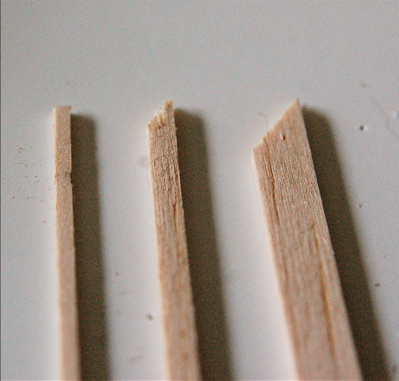
Three different sizes of balsa wood stock

Balsa wood is very soft and light, with a coarse, open grain. The density of dry balsa wood ranges from 40 to 475 kg/m^{3} (2.5 to 29.7 lb/cu ft), with a typical density around 160 kg/m^{3} (10 lb/cu ft). Balsa is the softest wood ever measured using the Janka hardness test (22 to 167 lbf (98 to 743 N)). The wood of the living tree has large cells that are filled with water. This gives the wood a spongy texture. It also makes the wood of the living tree not much lighter than water and barely able to float. For commercial production, the wood is kiln-dried for about two weeks, leaving the cells hollow and empty. The large volume-to-surface ratio of the resulting thin-walled, empty cells gives the dried wood a large strength-to-weight ratio because the cells are mostly air. Unlike naturally rotted wood, which soon disintegrates in the rainforests where balsa trees grow, the cell walls of kiln-seasoned balsa wood retain their strong structure of cellulose and lignin.

Because it is low in density but high in specific strength (strength per weight), balsa is a very popular material for light, stiff structures in model bridge tests, model buildings, and construction of model aircraft; all grades are usable for airworthy control line and radio-controlled aircraft varieties of the aeromodeling sports, with the lightest "contest grades" especially valuable for free-flight model aircraft. However, it is also valued as a component of full-sized light wooden aeroplanes, most notably the World War II de Havilland Mosquito.

Balsa is used to make wooden crankbaits for fishing, especially Rapala lures.

Sticks of dried balsa are useful as makeshift pens for calligraphy when commercial metal nibs of the desired width are not available.

Balsa wood is often selected as a core material in composites. Because balsa grows quickly and tolerates poor soils, it is lower in cost per performance compared to polymer foams like EPS while having better tensile strength than typical foams. For example, the blades of wind turbines are commonly constructed of many balsa plywood cores and internal spars covered with resin infused cloth on both sides. In table tennis rackets, a balsa layer is typically sandwiched between two pieces of thin plywood made from other species of wood. Balsa wood is also used in laminates together with glass-reinforced plastic (fibreglass) for making high-quality balsa surfboards and for the decks and topsides of many types of boats, especially pleasure craft less than 30 metres (98 ft) in length. On a boat, the balsa core is usually end-grain balsa, which is much more resistant to compression than if the soft balsa wood were laid lengthwise.

More than 90% of the world's Balsa wood volume is prepared into end grain panels for the composites industry, mostly used as structural cores in the wind turbine blades, where strength, rigidity, durable and environmentally sustainable materials are sought after.

Balsa is also used in the manufacture of "breakaway" wooden props such as tables and chairs that are designed to be broken as part of theatre, movie, and television productions.

The fifth and sixth generations of the Chevrolet Corvette had floor pans composed of balsa sandwiched between sheets of carbon-fibre reinforced plastic.

The Norwegian scientist and adventurer Thor Heyerdahl, convinced that early contact between the peoples of South America and Polynesia was possible, built the raft Kon Tiki from balsa logs, and on it his crew and he sailed the Pacific Ocean from Peru to the Polynesian Tuamotu Archipelago in 1947. However, the Kon Tiki logs were not seasoned and owed much of their (rather slight) buoyancy to the fact that their sap was of lower density than sea water. This serendipitously may have saved the expedition, because it prevented the seawater from waterlogging the wood and sinking the raft.

Balsa wood is also a popular wood type used in the arts of whittling, and surfing. In the making of picture frames, balsa was often used in a baroque style because of the ease of shaping the design.

In parts of Africa and south America the leaves of the balsa tree are used to enhance the traditional panning method of extracting gold from ore. When mixed with water a soapy solution is produced and this helps the lighter, unwanted material to wash away.

== Gallery ==
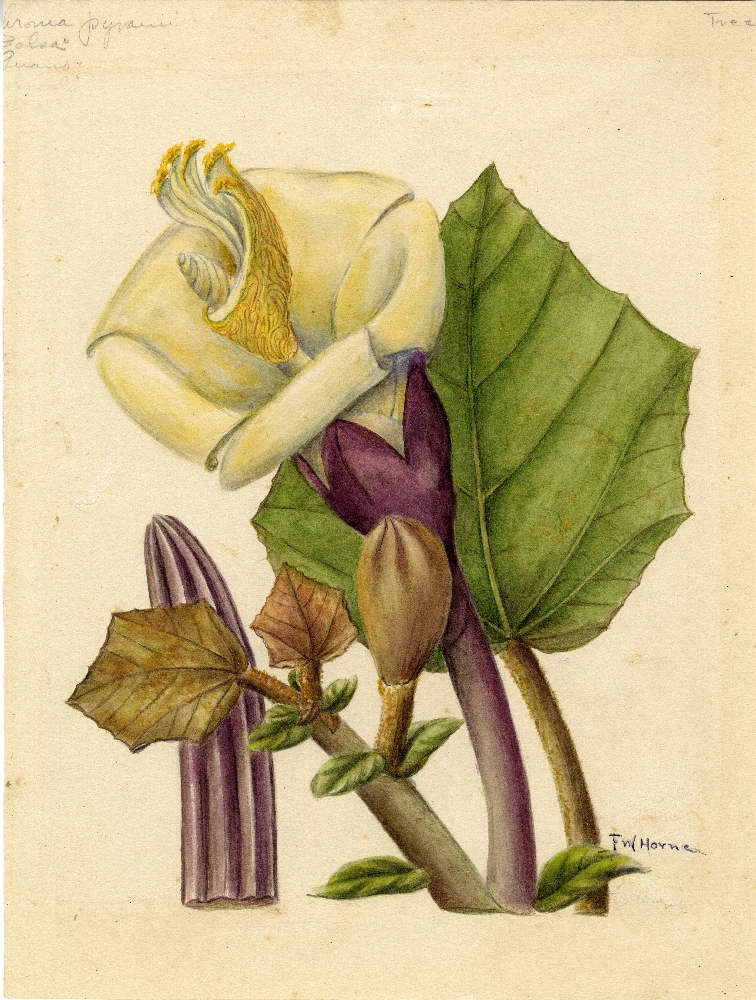
Painting by Frances W. Horne from the Flora Borinqueña

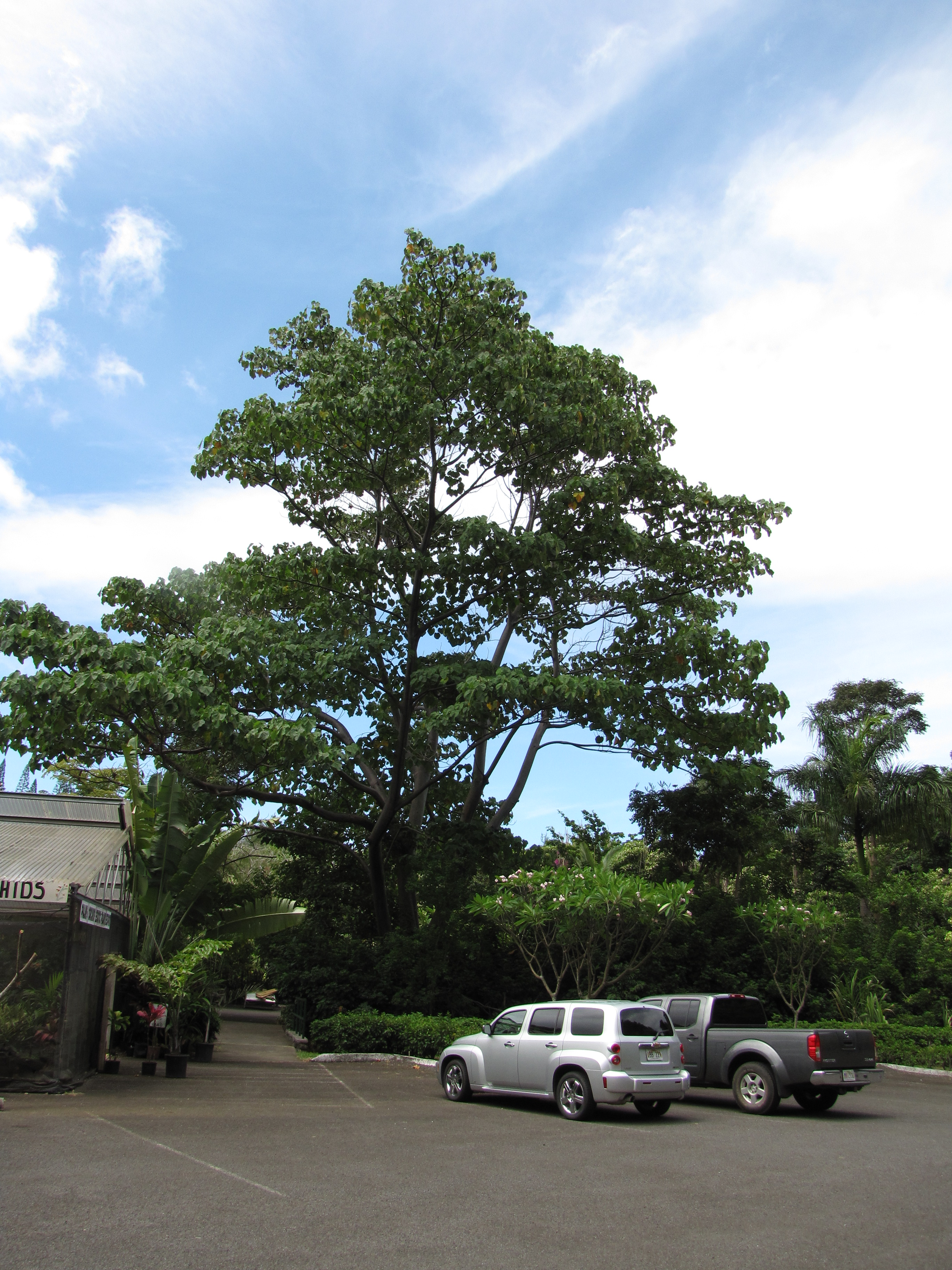
Ochroma pyramidale at Tropical Gardens of Maui

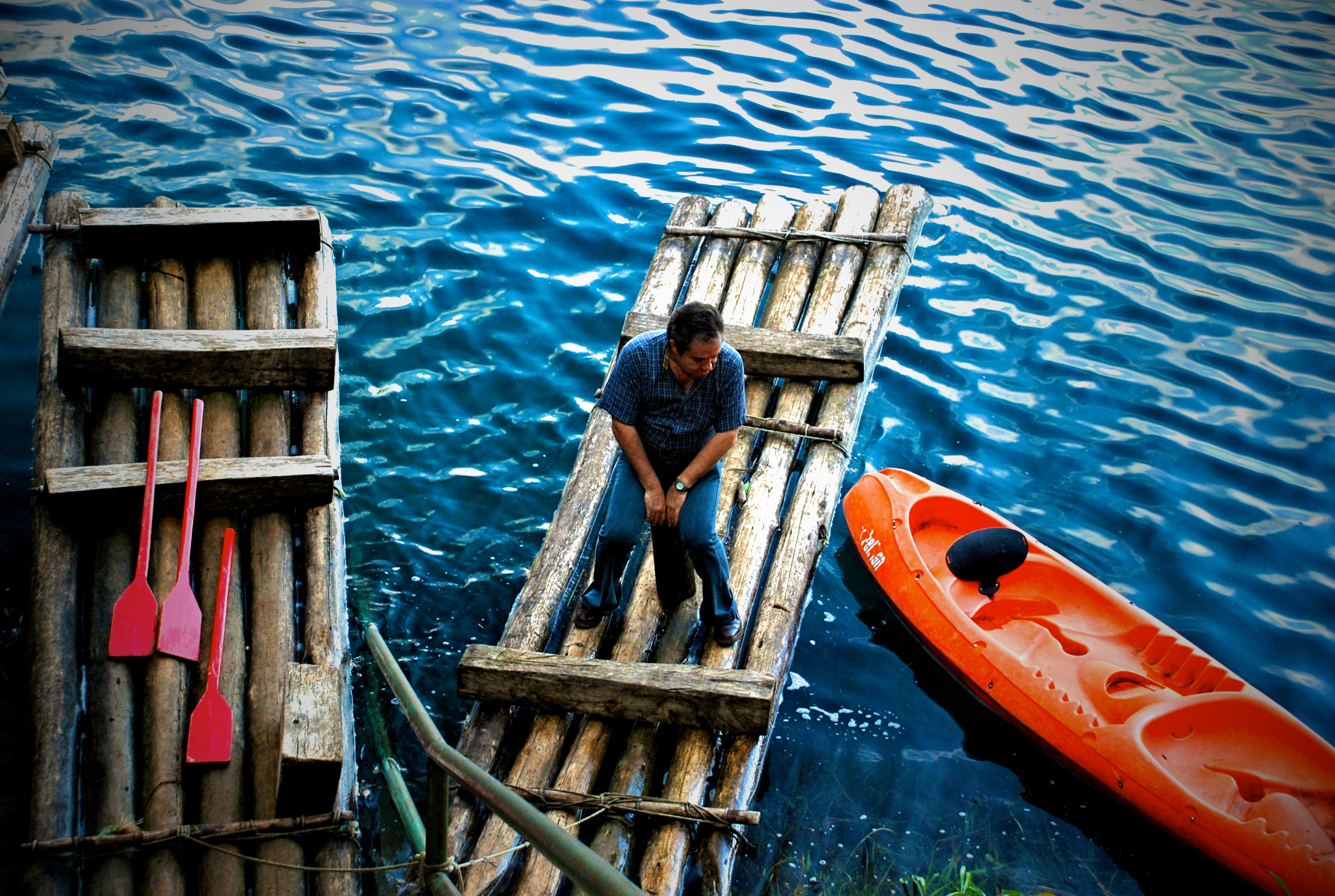
Two balsa rafts and a kayak at Lagos de Montebello in Chiapas, Mexico

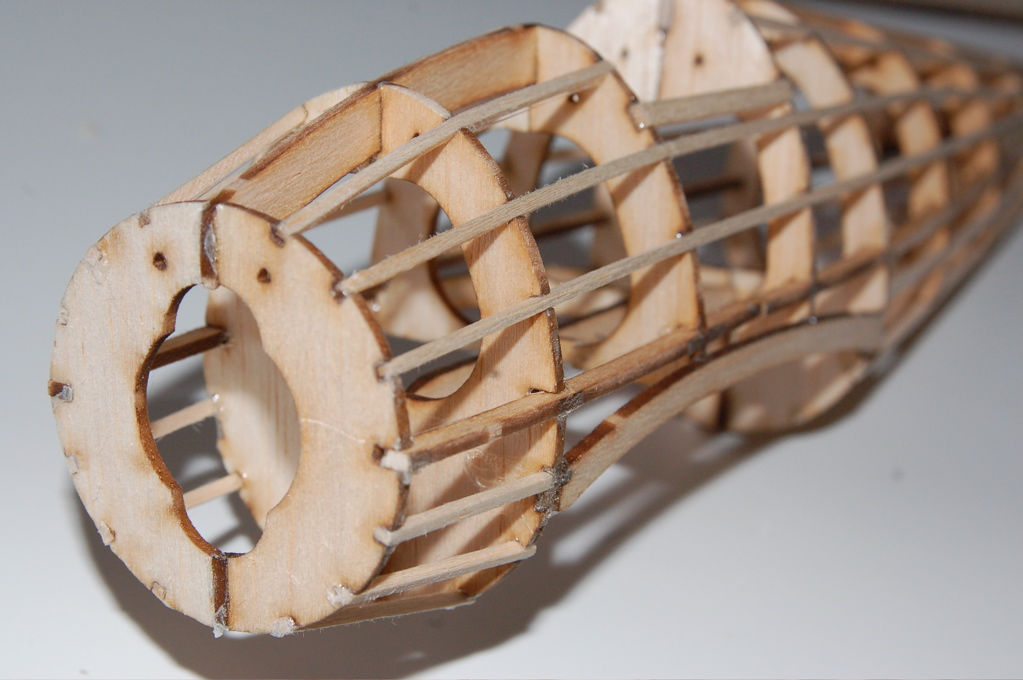
Balsa construction in a "stick and tissue" free-flight rubber scale model airplane

== See also ==
- Tilia, another tree producing lightweight wood (especially Tilia americana)
- Paulownia
