= Scientific demonstration =

Procedure for demonstrating scientific principles

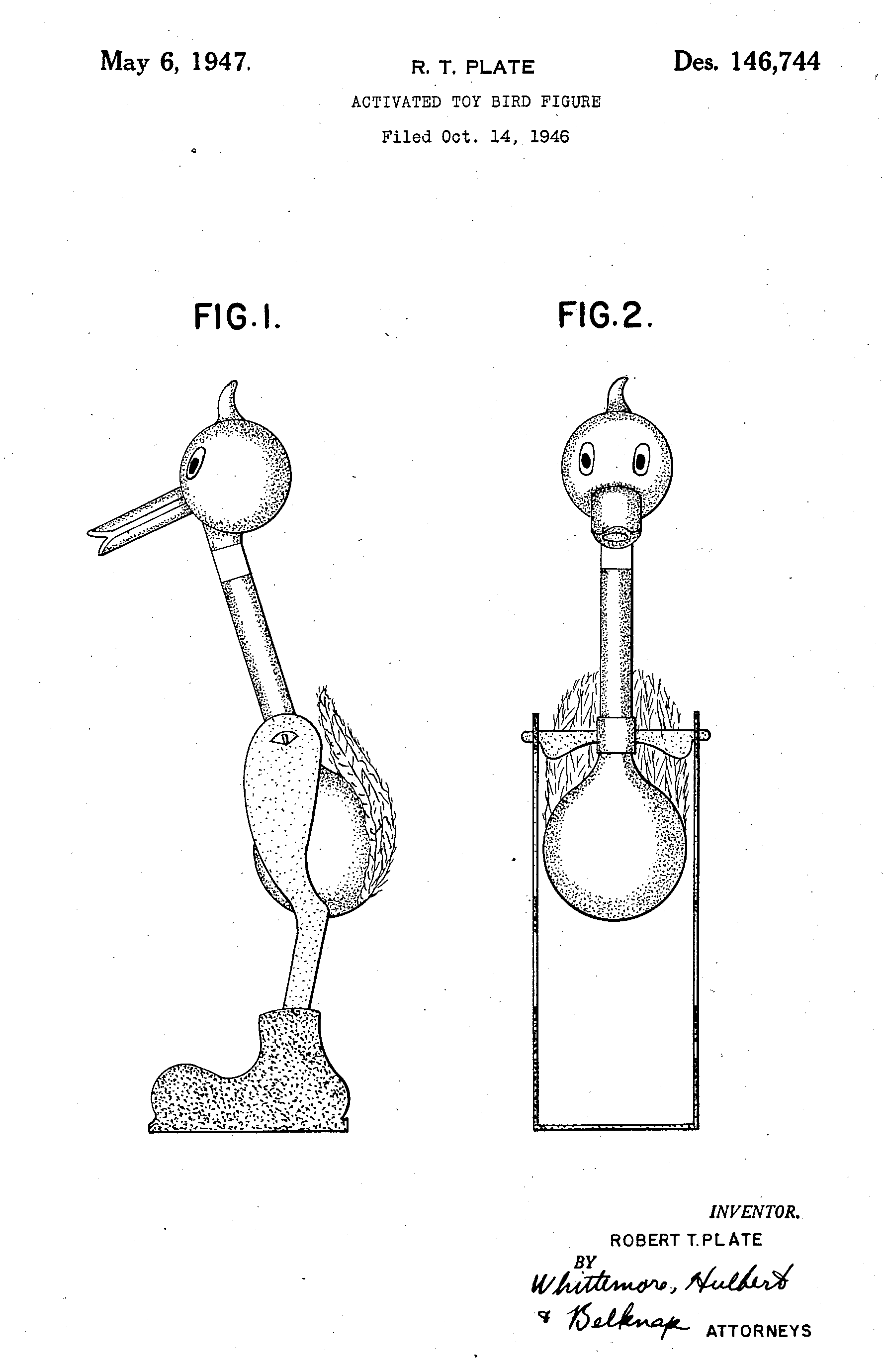

A scientific demonstration is a procedure carried out for the purpose of demonstrating scientific principles, rather than for hypothesis testing or knowledge gathering (although they may originally have been carried out for these purposes).

Most scientific demonstrations are simple laboratory demonstrations intended to demonstrate physical principles, often in a surprising or entertaining way. They are carried out in schools and universities, and sometimes in public demonstrations in popular science lectures and TV programs aimed at the public. Many scientific demonstrations are chosen for their combination of educational merit and entertainment value, which is often provided by dramatic phenomena such as explosions.

Public scientific demonstrations were a common occurrence in the Age of Enlightenment, and have long been a feature of the British Royal Institution Christmas Lectures, which date back to 1825. In the television era, scientific demonstrations have featured in science-related entertainment shows such as MythBusters and Brainiac: Science Abuse.

Many scientific demonstrations are potentially dangerous, and should not be attempted without considerable laboratory experience and appropriate safety precautions. Many older well-known scientific demonstrations, once mainstays of science education, are now effectively impossible to demonstrate to an audience without breaking health and safety laws. Some older demonstrations, such as allowing the audience to play with liquid mercury, are sufficiently dangerous that they should not be attempted by anyone under any circumstances.

== See also ==
- Demonstration (teaching)
- List of scientific demonstrations
- Physics Instructional Resource Association
- Science in the Age of Enlightenment
- Technology demonstration
