= Galilean cannon =

Device showing conservation of linear momentum

A Galilean cannon with proportions similar to the Astro Blaster

In physics, a Galilean cannon (named after Galileo Galilei) is a device that demonstrates conservation of linear momentum. It comprises a stack of balls, starting with a large, heavy ball at the base of the stack and progresses up to a small, lightweight ball at the top. The basic idea is that when this stack of balls is dropped to the ground each ball, from bottom to top, will collide with a lower ball that is already moving upward after its collision with the ground respectively the ball under it. The theoretical limit for the upward speed of the top ball of a two-ball cannon with perfectly elastic balls and a large mass difference is three times the falling speed before the collision. The speed ratio is multiplied throughout the sequence of upward collisions during the bounce so that the topmost ball will rebound to many times the height from which it was dropped. At first sight, the behavior seems highly counter-intuitive, but in fact is precisely what conservation of momentum predicts. The result can be derived by assuming small gaps between the balls and considering each collision separately.

The principal difficulty is in keeping the configuration of the balls stable during the initial drop. Early descriptions involve some sort of glue/tape, tube, or net to align the balls. A modern version of the Galilean cannon was sold by Edmund Scientific Corporation and is still sold as the "Astro Blaster". In this device, a heavy wire is threaded through all of the balls to keep them accurately aligned - but the principle is the same. The resulting rebound is quite powerful; in fact, eye safety issues became so prevalent that this toy now comes with safety goggles.

Physics professor Brian Greene has used the Galilean cannon to illustrate the rebound mechanisms underlying a supernova explosion.

A Galilean cannon made from a basketball and a handball

It is possible to demonstrate the principle more simply with just two balls, such as a basketball and a tennis ball. If an experimenter balances the tennis ball on top of the basketball and drops the pair to the ground, the tennis ball will rebound to many times the height from which it was released.

== Calculation for two balls ==
Assuming elastic collisions, uniform gravity, no air resistance and the sizes of the balls being negligible compared to the heights from which they are dropped, formulas for conservation of momentum and kinetic energy can be used to calculate the speed and heights of rebound of the small ball:

$$\;\;\,m_1v_1^\prime\, + \;\;\,m_2v_2^\prime\, = \;\;\,m_1v_1 + \;\;\,m_2v_2$$
$$\tfrac{1}{2}m_1v_1^{\prime2} + \tfrac{1}{2}m_2v_2^{\prime2} = \tfrac{1}{2}m_1v_1^2 + \tfrac{1}{2}m_2v_2^2$$.

where	m_{1} =	mass of the large (lower) ball
	m_{2} =	mass of the small (upper) ball
	v_{1}′ =	velocity of the large ball after the collision between the balls
	v_{2}′ =	velocity of the small ball after the collision between the balls
	v_{1} =	velocity of the large ball before the collision between the balls
	v_{2} =	velocity of the small ball before the collision between the balls

Solving the simultaneous equations above for v_{2}′,

$$v_2^\prime = \frac{(m_2 - m_1) v_2 + 2 m_1 v_1}{m_1 + m_2}$$

Taking velocities upwards as positive, as the balls fall from the same height and the large ball rebounds off the floor with the same speed, v_{1} = −v_{2} (the negative sign denoting the direction reversed). Thus

Plot of maximum ideal rebound height ratio (r_{h}) vs mass ratio (r_{m}) for a two-ball Galilean cannon

$$\;\,v_2^\prime\,\; = - \frac{3 m_1 - m_2}{m_1 + m_2} v_2$$
$$\Bigg|\frac{v_2^\prime}{v_2}\Bigg| = \;\;\,\frac{3 m_1 - m_2}{m_1 + m_2} = 3 - \frac{4}{\tfrac{m_1}{m_2} + 1 }$$.

Because $\frac{m_1}{m_2} > 1, 1 < \Bigg|\frac{v_2^\prime}{v_2}\Bigg| < 3$. As the rebound height is linearly proportional to the square of the launch speed, the maximum rebound height for a two-ball cannon is 3^{2} = 9 times the original drop height, when m_{1} >> m_{2}.

== See also ==
- Newton's cradle
