= EMG-01 =

First commercially available coilgun

- Type: Coilgun
- Place of origin: United States

Production history
- Designer: Arcflash Labs
- Manufacturer: Arcflash Labs
- Unit cost: ~US$1,000
- Produced: 2018–present

Specifications
- Mass: 5 pounds (2.3 kg)
- Length: 22 inches (56 cm)
- Barrel length: 10 inches (25 cm)
- Width: 2.25 inches (5.7 cm)
- Height: 8 inches (20 cm)
- Caliber: 6.35mm x variable
- Rate of fire: Up to 480 rounds/min
- Muzzle velocity: Up to 45 m/s
- Feed system: 18-round magazine

The Arcflash Labs EMG-01 is a hand-held automatic 8-stage coilgun designed and manufactured by Arcflash Labs in Los Angeles, California. It was the first handheld coilgun commercialized and sold as a fully assembled system.

== Operating mechanism ==
The EMG-01 uses a six-cell 25.2 volt lithium-ion polymer battery to supply up to 2000 watts of power to ten electrolytic capacitors. Unlike many coilguns, the EMG-01 operates at low voltage and does not use an inverter or capacitor charging system, which allows the system to charge in under 1/10th of a second. The ten aforementioned capacitors are used to power eight electromagnetic coils in the configuration of a linear motor to accelerate a ferromagnetic or conducting projectile to 45 m/s. Rather than fully discharging each capacitor into a single respective coil, the system uses a series of IGBTs to discharge a small portion of the total bank's energy into each coil. This system design is in contrast to many hobbyist coilguns which require several seconds or even minutes to charge a single shot, and enables the EMG-01 to fire at rates of up to 480 rounds/min.

== Alpha Model ==
The EMG-01A (Alpha model) was offered for sale from July 2018 to October 2018. It was sold for $950 to pre-order customers and was only produced in a small batch production run of 10 units.

== Beta Model ==
The EMG-01B (Beta model) was developed as a more manufacturable iteration of the base EMG-01 design. It was offered for sale in 2020 and discontinued in 2023.

== EMG-02 ==
In 2022, Arcflash Labs released a more powerful iteration with a larger bore (0.313") and 2 additional coils, with 4x the muzzle energy of the EMG-01B (up to 20J). It operates at a higher voltage than the EMG-01B; accepting 63V "flexvolt" drill batteries and featuring a single large capacitor at the rear. The EMG-02 is still being offered for sale as of 2024.
