= Balsa wood bridge =

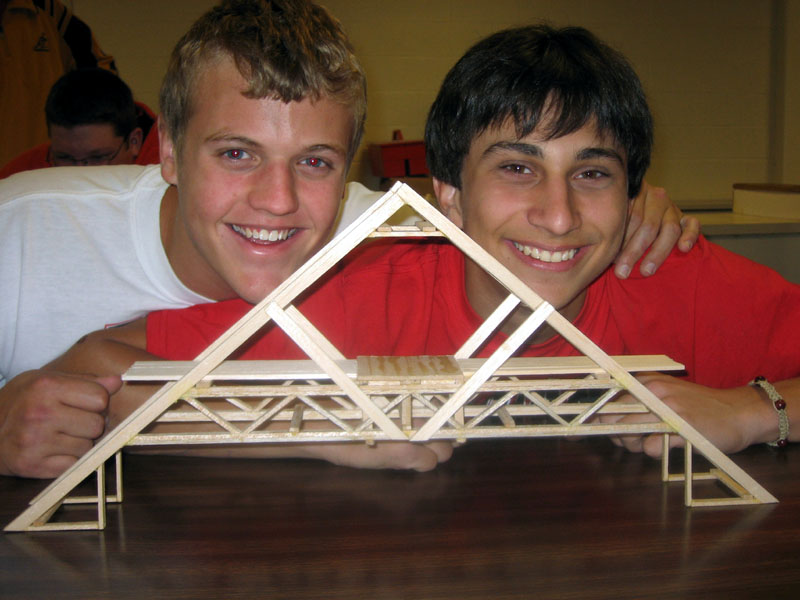
Building balsa wood bridges as a part of a unit on statics, structures, forces, or construction trades is used by teachers to make the learning environment hands-on and to give students a real-world example of material covered in class

The building of balsa-wood bridges is often used as an educational technology. It may be accompanied by a larger project involving varying areas of study.

Typically classes which would include a balsa wood bridge cover the subject areas of physics, engineering, static equilibrium, or building trades, although it may be done independently of any of these subjects. Building a balsa wood bridge can be done after completing a section or unit covering a related topic or the process of design and building can be used to guide students to a better understanding of the desired subject area.

== Requirements ==
Although there is great variety between different balsa wood bridge projects, students are in general trying to build a bridge that can withstand the greatest weight before it fails. Other restrictions are often applied, but these vary widely from one contest to another. Sample requirements include:

- restricting the maximum mass of the bridge
- requiring a minimum span
- requiring a minimum height of the roadway
- restricting the physical dimensions of the bridge
- restricting the size of individual pieces of balsa wood
- limiting the amount of glue or balsa wood that can be used
- requiring a driveable roadway that allows passage of a vehicle of specified size
- restricting the way pieces are placed on the bridge (for example no parallel joining pieces)

== Testing ==
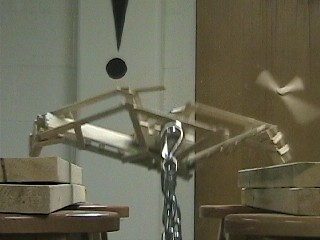
A balsa bridge breaks after holding a mass of 40.4 kg (89 lb). The failure of the entire bridge was a result of the failure of just the roadway.

Bridges are usually tested by applying a downward force on the bridge. How and where the force is applied varies from one contest to the next. There are two common methods of applying the test force to the bridge:

- By hanging a container (such as a trash can) from the bridge and loading known weights into the container until the bridge breaks. The tester could also slowly add water or sand to the container until the bridge breaks and then weigh the container, providing a more accurate way to find the breaking force.
- By using a mechanical or pneumatic testing device that pushes down on the bridge with increasing force until the bridge breaks. If such a testing device is used it is often equipped with a method of automatically gathering force data, such as a pressure sensor or load cell connected to a computer. This approach is more accurate at measuring bridges that have secondary structure that proves to be stronger than the primary structure. This method is also less damaging to the bridge, whose structure usually remains intact since the load is automatically relieved at failure.

Of the two, the hanging container method provides by far the greater dramatic effect. Testing with a pneumatic press or ram is often complete in a matter of seconds. Exceptionally strong bridges may take up to thirty minutes to test as weight (a combination of steel weights and sand is often used) is added to the suspended container.

== Scoring and Grading ==
=== Scoring ===
There are two chief ways that balsa wood bridge competitions may be scored. One way is simply by measuring how much weight each bridge can support. The second way is by structural efficiency, often expressed as a strength to weight ratio. The weight-only method is most effective where competitors are all building from a specified set of materials and are expected to use all the available materials. The strength-to-weight method is better when competitors are expected to use their materials as efficiently as possible.

=== Competitive Grading ===
Competitive grading compares how well each bridge does against bridges built by other participants to determine a grade. The top scoring bridge is assigned a maximum numeric grade (say, 100%) while the lowest scoring bridge that still meets all basic specifications is assigned a minimum grade (say, 70%).

The method guarantees that some scores will be high even if the overall quality of bridges is low. Conversely, it also guarantees that some scores will be low, even in situations where all bridges are of high quality.

=== Standards-Based Grading ===
Standards-based grading sets certain standards that need to be met in order to earn a certain grade. An example of standards-based scoring would be to say that all bridges that hold 50 kilograms (110 lb) earn full credit; bridges that hold 25 kilograms (55 lb) earn half credit, and bridges that hold less than 10 kilograms (22 lb) earn no credit.

This method allows every bridge to potentially earn full credit if the standards are met. In situations where competition is weak, this method runs the risk of having many competitors receive no credit.

== See also ==
- Spaghetti bridge
- Bridge
- Balsa
- Trusses
- Statics
- Physics
- Civil Engineering
- Problem Based Learning
