= Hydrophobic sand =

Sand coated with a hydrophobic compound

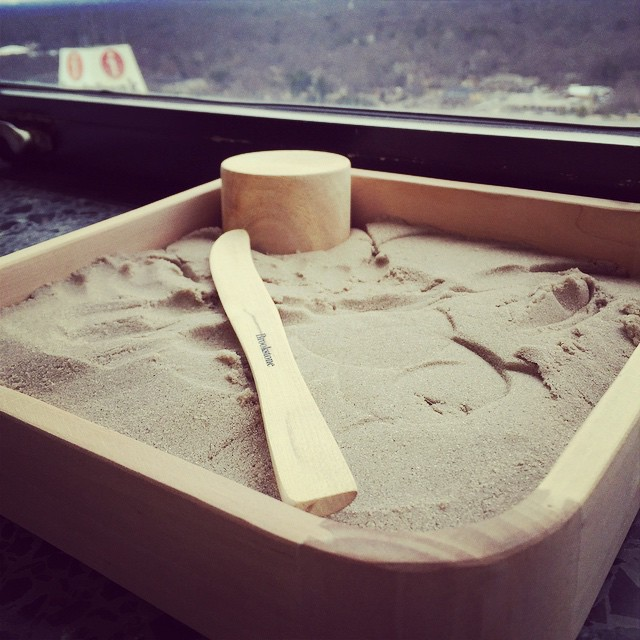
Sensory sand in a box as an office toy

Hydrophobic sand (or magic sand) is a toy made from sand coated with a hydrophobic compound. The presence of the hydrophobic compound causes the grains of sand to adhere to one another and form cylinders (to minimize surface area) when exposed to water, and form a pocket of air around the sand. The pocket of air makes magic sand unable to get wet. A variation of this moldable sensory sand has several of the same properties, but acts like wet sand that will not dry out. Hydrophobic sand, whether the wet or dry type, will not mix with water.

== History ==
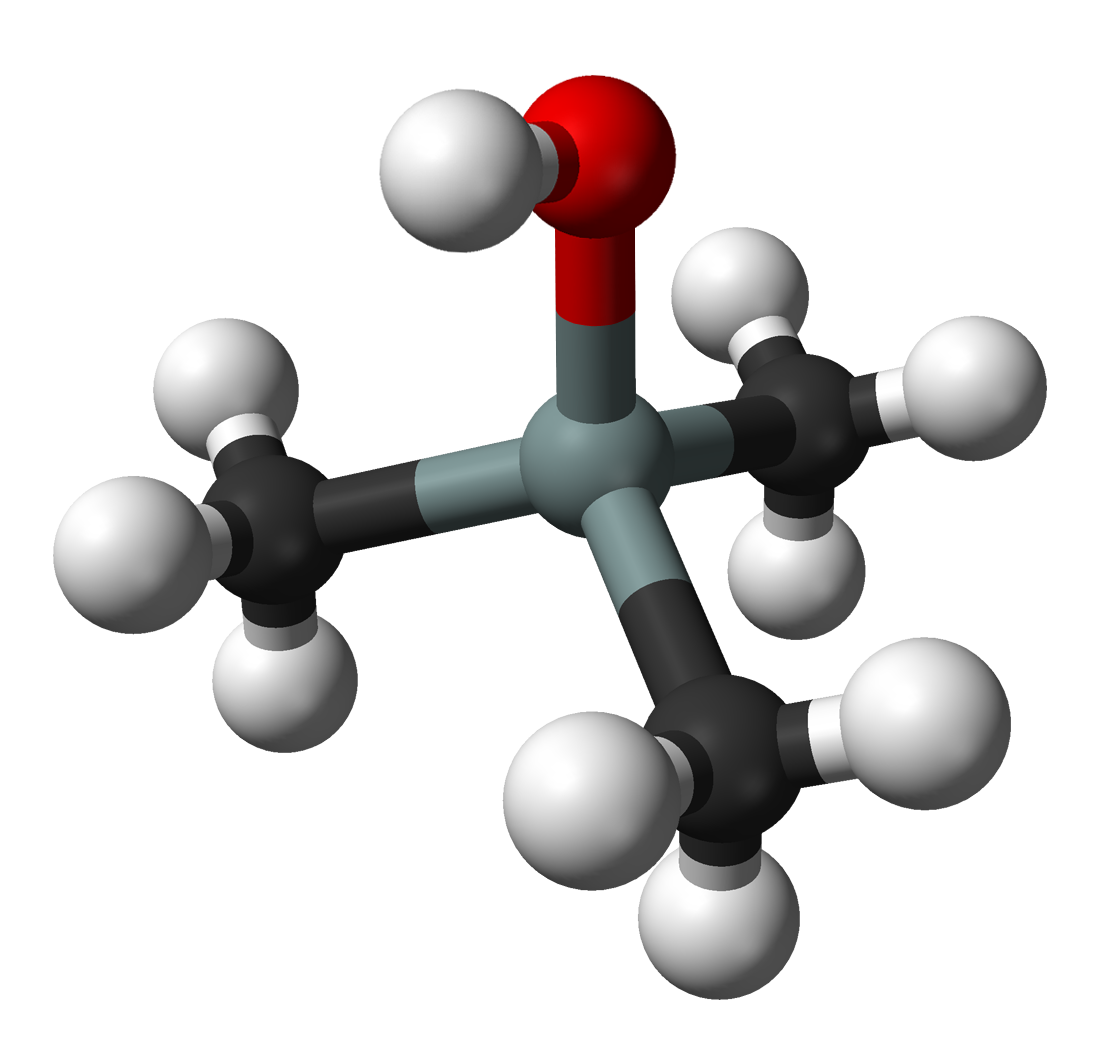
Trimethylsilanol

The earliest reference to waterproof sand is in the 1915 book The Boy Mechanic Book 2 published by Popular Mechanics. The Boy Mechanic states waterproof sand was invented by East Indian magicians. The sand was made by mixing heated sand with melted wax. The wax would repel water when the sand was exposed to water.

It was originally developed to trap ocean oil spills by being sprinkled on floating petroleum; the sand would mix with the oil and cause it to sink. Due to the expense of production, however, it is no longer used for this purpose.

Hydrophobic sand has also been tested by utility companies in Arctic regions as a foundation for junction boxes, as it never freezes. It is also used as an aerating medium for potted plants.

== Properties ==
=== Magic sand ===
The properties of magic sand are achieved using ordinary beach sand, which contains tiny particles of pure silica, and exposing it to vapors of trimethylsilanol (CH_{3})_{3}SiOH, an organosilicon compound. Upon exposure, the trimethylsilanol compound bonds to the silica particles while forming water. The exteriors of the sand grains are thus coated with hydrophobic groups. When magic sand is removed from water, it is completely dry and free-flowing.

=== Brands ===
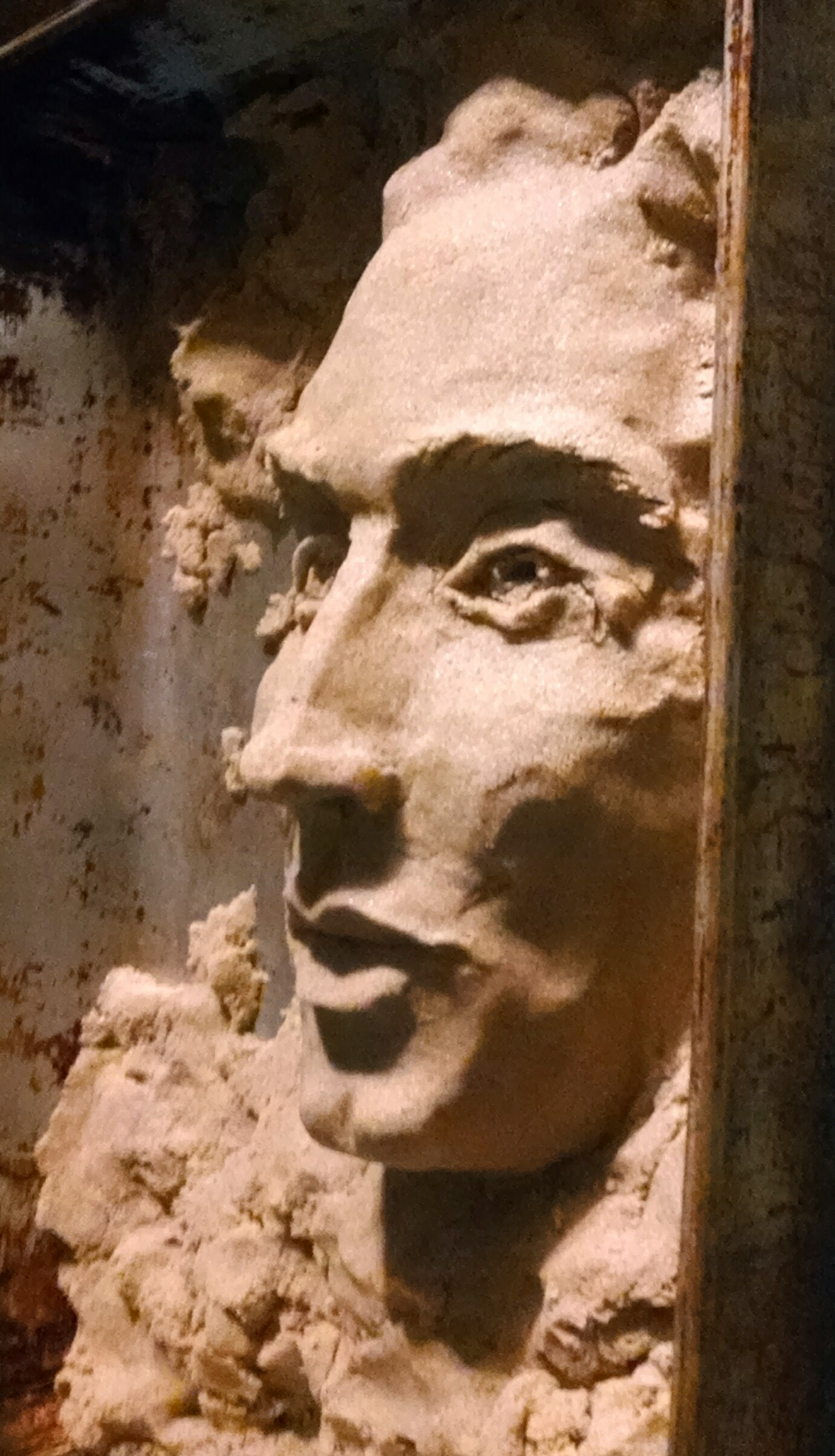
Kinetic sand sculpted into a profile

Kinetic Sand

A toy trademarked and produced by Spin Master. Kinetic Sand looks like regular wet sand but is available in different colors. It can be molded into any desired shape. It never dries out, and it sticks to itself.

== Health issues ==
=== Asbestos in Play Sand in Australia ===
On 12 November 2025, the Australian Competition and Consumer Commission (ACCC) warned multiple brands of coloured play sand were contaminated with asbestos. There were seventy schools closed for testing and possible decontamination.

== See also ==
- List of toys
- Modelling clay
