= Demonstration (teaching) =

Teaching method that explains concepts by showing how they work

Demonstration involves showing by reason or proof, explaining or making clear by use of examples or experiments. Put more simply, demonstration means 'to clearly show'.

== Overview ==
In teaching through demonstration, students are set up to potentially conceptualize class material more effectively as shown in a study which specifically focuses on chemistry demonstrations presented by teachers. Demonstrations often occur when students have a hard time connecting theories to actual practice or when students are unable to understand application of theories.

Teachers not only demonstrate specific learning concepts within the classroom, they can also participate in demonstration classrooms to help improve their own teaching strategies, which may or may not be demonstrative in nature. Although the literature is limited, studies show that the effects of demonstration classroom teachers includes a change of perspective in relating to students, more reflection in the teachers’ own classroom strategies, and more personal responsibility for student learning.

Demonstration, or clearly showing (a gamut that ranges from mere pointing to more sophisticated strategies such as chemical reactions), can possibly be used in portraying ideas such as defining words. At first, simple observation and communication through pointing to an object, area, or place, like the sun, moon, or a large mountain top, occurs. Then basic definitions of words emerge. These definitions allow humans to communicate, interact, plan, and co-ordinate in ways that help us to build cities, large buildings, technology, gain knowledge and to successfully communicate with computers. Further, basic concepts centered on time, space, and mathematics are first required to demonstrate and teach probable theories that accurately describe universal phenomenon such as nature, planets, species, and the world around us.

The history of phenomenon demonstrating concepts, which lead to specific definitions, goes back to the careful observations of ancient Greek philosophers and natural philosophy. Socrates, Plato, and Aristotle attempted to carefully define words that included natural phenomena and objects. John Longeway notes that in the Middle Ages, the theory of demonstration, which developed the thinking in Aristotle's Posterior Analytics, was considered "the culmination of logic". The modern scientific method often uses demonstrations that carefully describe certain processes and parts of nature in great detail. In science, often one demonstrates how an experiment is done and shows this to others.

People can also communicate values and ideas through demonstrations. This is often done in plays, movies, and film. Pictures without words can show or demonstrate various types of actions and consequences.

When using demonstration, there is a four-step process that will allow the students to have a clear understanding of the topic at hand.

== See also ==
- Knowledge by acquaintance
- Scientific demonstration
- Physics Instructional Resource Association
