= Battery Giant =

- Battery Giant Logo (Present)
- Company type: Retail Battery Franchise
- Founder: Kurt Smith
- Headquarters: 318 John R Road, Troy, Michigan, U.S.
- Number of locations: 10
- Key people: Kurt Smith (CEO/President)
- Products: Alkaline Batteries; Automotive Batteries; SLA Batteries; Lead-acid Batteries; Cordless Tool Batteries; Lithium Batteries; Power Wheels Batteries and Repair
- Services: Battery Rebuilding; Power Wheels Repair; Razor Scooter Repair; Watch Battery Installation
- Website: batterygiant.com

Battery Giant is a privately owned battery retail franchise based in Troy, Michigan. Founded in 2007 as an e-commerce based retailer, the company now operates locations throughout the United States, Puerto Rico, and Panama. Not affiliated with Giant Battery Co.

== History ==
Kurt H. Smith is the founder of Battery Giant and Energy Products Inc., a vendor to Battery Giant. In 2010, Battery Giant opened their first retail locations in Sterling Heights, MI and Southfield, MI. The first franchisee owned stores opened in 2010 in Rochester, MI and Macomb, MI.

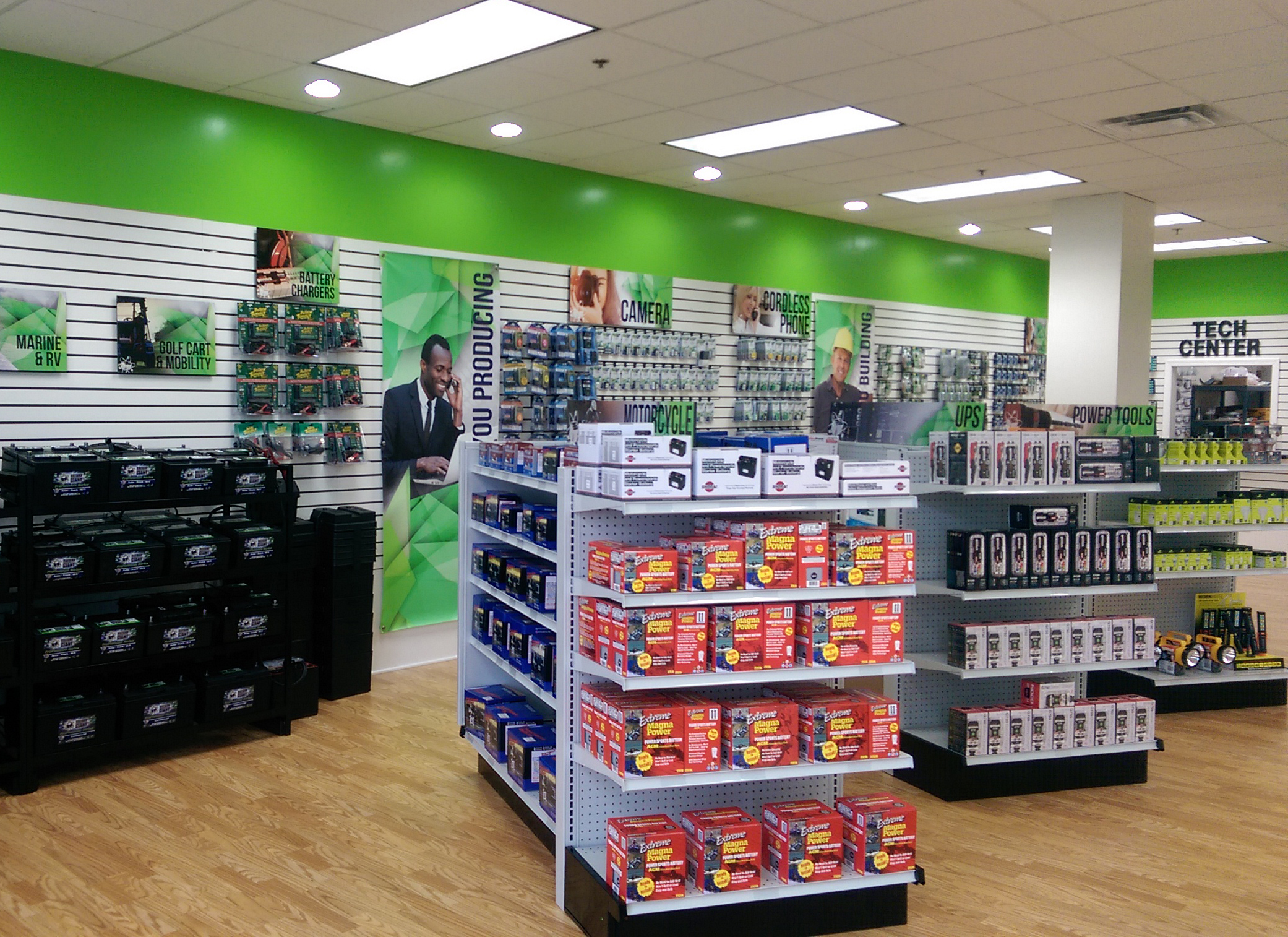
Battery Giant Interior Naperville, IL

== Expansion ==
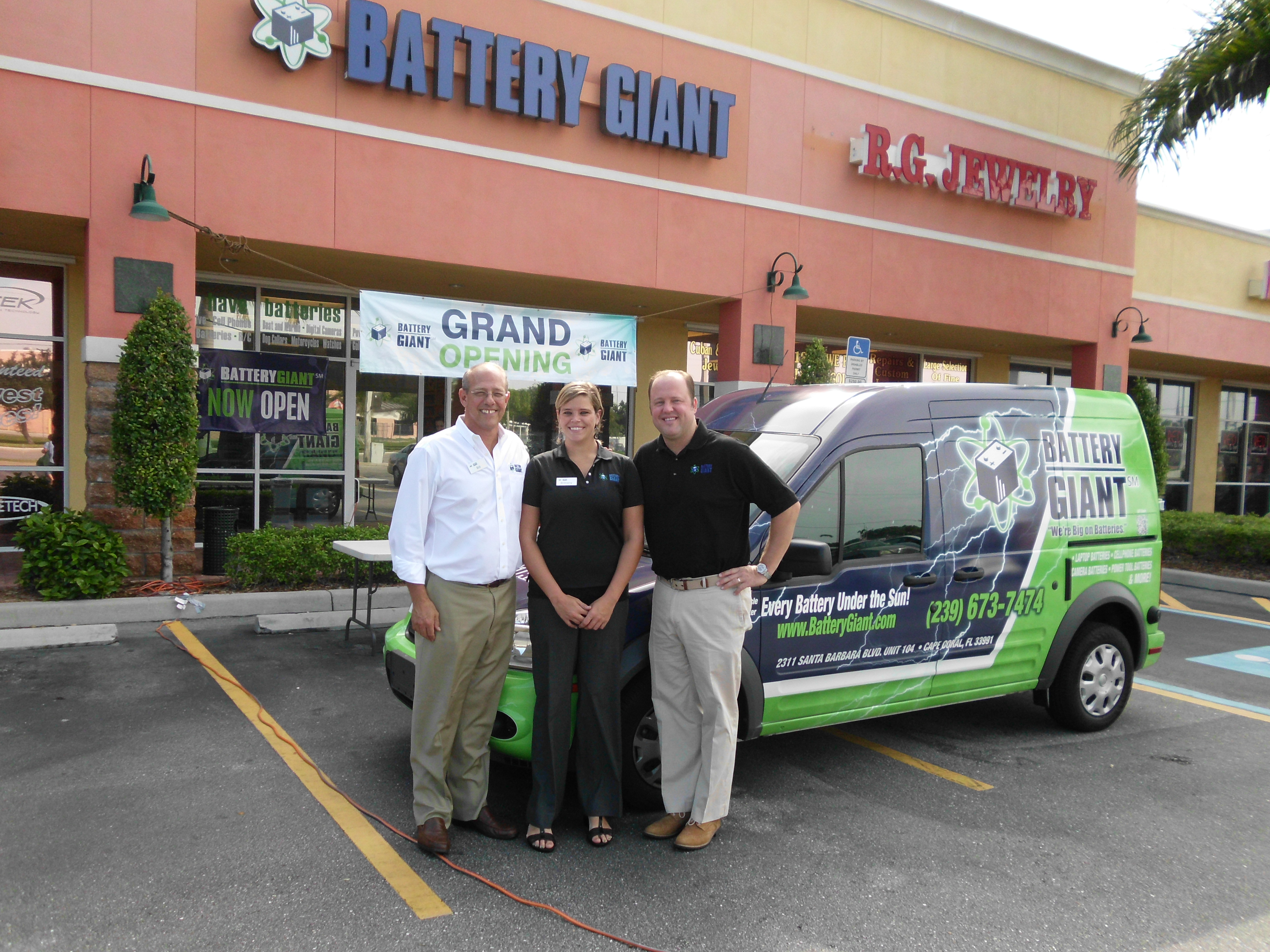
Cape Coral, FL Battery Giant location

The company lists battery store locations in Arizona, Arkansas, Colorado, Illinois, Kentucky, Michigan, Ohio, Pennsylvania, Texas, Puerto Rico, Mexico, and the Republic of Panama. There are currently 19 stores.

== Business Model ==
Battery Giant is a retail sales and commercial sales business which utilizes a retail storefront to service customers and also services local commercial accounts. Battery Giant supplies a range of battery products, including: automotive, household (alkaline batteries), power tool, powersport, mobile phone, camcorder, camera and SLA batteries. Each retail location has an in-house tech center which builds custom battery packs, handles watch battery replacements, power tool battery rebuilds and services battery powered motorized toys such as Power Wheels and Razor Scooters.

== Battery Recycling ==
Most Battery Giant locations accept all types of batteries for recycling. Please contact your local Battery Giant for details and fees where applicable. Many Battery Giant stores are regular participants in recycling drives in the communities where their stores are located.
