= Thinned-array curse =

Theorem in electromagnetic theory of antennas

Thinned-array Curse
- Type: electromagnetic theory of antennas
- Field: electromagnetic
- Statement: A transmitting antenna which is synthesized from a coherent phased array of smaller antenna apertures that are spaced apart will have a smaller minimum beam spot size.
- First stated by: Robert L. Forward
- First stated in: 1976

The thinned-array curse (sometimes, sparse-array curse) is a theorem in electromagnetic theory of antennas. It states that a transmitting antenna which is synthesized from a coherent phased array of smaller antenna apertures that are spaced apart will have a smaller minimum beam spot size, but the amount of power that is beamed into this main lobe is reduced by an exactly proportional amount, so that the total power density in the beam is constant.

The origin of the term is not clear. Robert L. Forward cites use of the term in unpublished Hughes Research Laboratories reports dating from 1976.

== Example ==
Consider a number of small sub-apertures that are mutually adjacent to one another, so that they form a filled aperture array. Suppose that they are in orbit, beaming microwaves at a spot on the ground. Now, suppose you hold constant the number of sub-apertures and the power emitted by each, but separate the sub-apertures (while keeping them mutually phased) so as to synthesize a larger aperture. The spot size on the ground is reduced in size proportionally to the diameter of the synthesized array (and hence the area is reduced proportionally to the diameter of the synthesized array squared), but the power density at the ground is unchanged.

Thus:

1. The array is radiating the same amount of power (since each individual sub-aperture making the array radiates a constant amount of power whether or not it is adjacent the next aperture).
2. It has the same power per unit area at the center of the receiving spot on the ground.
3. The receiving spot on the ground is smaller.

From these three facts, it is clear that if the synthesized aperture has an area A, and the total area of it that is filled by active transmitters is a, then at most a fraction a/A of the radiated power reaches the target, and the fraction 1 - a/A is lost. This loss shows up in the form of power in side lobes.

This theorem can also be derived in more detail by considering a partially filled transmitter array as being the superposition of a fully filled array plus an array consisting of only the gaps, broadcasting exactly out of phase with the filled array. The interference pattern between the two reduces the power in the main beam lobe by exactly the factor 1 - a/A.

Note that the thinned array curse applies only to mutually coherent sources. If the transmitting sources are not mutually coherent, the size of the ground spot does not depend on the relationship of the individual sources to one another, but is simply the sum of the individual spots from each source.

== Consequences ==
The thinned array curse means that while synthesized apertures are useful for receivers with high angular resolution, they are not useful for power transmitters. It also means that if a filled array transmitter has gaps between individual elements, the main lobe of the beam will lose an amount of power proportional to the area of the gaps. Likewise, if a transmitter comprises multiple individual transmitters, some of which fail, the power lost from the main lobe will exceed the power of the lost transmitter, because power will also be diverted into the side lobes.

The thinned array curse has consequences for microwave power transmission and wireless energy transfer concepts such as solar power satellites; it suggests that it is not possible to make a smaller beam and hence reduce the size of a receiver (called a rectenna for microwave power beaming) by phasing together beams from many small satellites.

A short derivation of the thinned array curse, focusing on the implications for use of lasers to provide impulse for an interstellar probe (an application of beam-powered propulsion), can be found in Robert Forward's paper "Roundtrip Interstellar Travel Using Laser Pushed Lightsails."

== See also ==
- Radiation pattern
