= Energy Products Inc =

Energy providers in Michigan

Energy Products Inc.
- Type: Wholesale Batteries, chargers, industrial utility vehicles and recycling services
- Founder: Kurt Smith
- Headquarters: Madison Heights, MI, U.S.
- Key people: Kurt Smith (CEO); Jim Davis (Executive VP); John Byrd (VP Sales)
- Products: Automotive Batteries; SLA Batteries; Lead-acid Batteries; Cordless Tool Batteries; Lithium Batteries; Industrial Utility Vehicles; Chargers and Charging Systems
- Services: Wholesale Battery Distribution; Industrial Battery Supply, Repair & Maintenance; Industrial Battery Supply, Repair & Maintenance; Industrial Utility Vehicles; Battery Recycling
- Website: energyprod.com

Energy Products Inc. is a privately owned company based in Madison Heights, Michigan. They provide batteries, chargers, industrial utility vehicles, scrubbers/sweepers and recycling services. They sell and maintain industrial batteries and charging systems for forklifts, material handling equipment, AGV’s and utility vehicles used primarily in manufacturing and warehousing. Energy Products is also a wholesale distributor of automotive, deep cycle and sealed lead acid batteries as well as batteries and chargers for consumer electronic devices. In 2012 Energy Products started engineering, furnishing and installing backup power systems, service testing and provides removal services for a wide range of customers including banks, hospitals, property managers and the telecommunication industry. Energy Products offers a comprehensive recycling program for all battery chemistries. In 2013 they announced they recycled over 2,000,000 pounds of batteries in 2012 for customers located throughout the United States.

Energy Products represents manufacturers Trojan, Taylor Dunn, Club Car, Advance Scrubbers & Sweepers, Ametek and others.

The company was founded and is wholly owned by Kurt H. Smith, also the founder of Battery Giant – a retail battery store franchise.

== Facilities ==
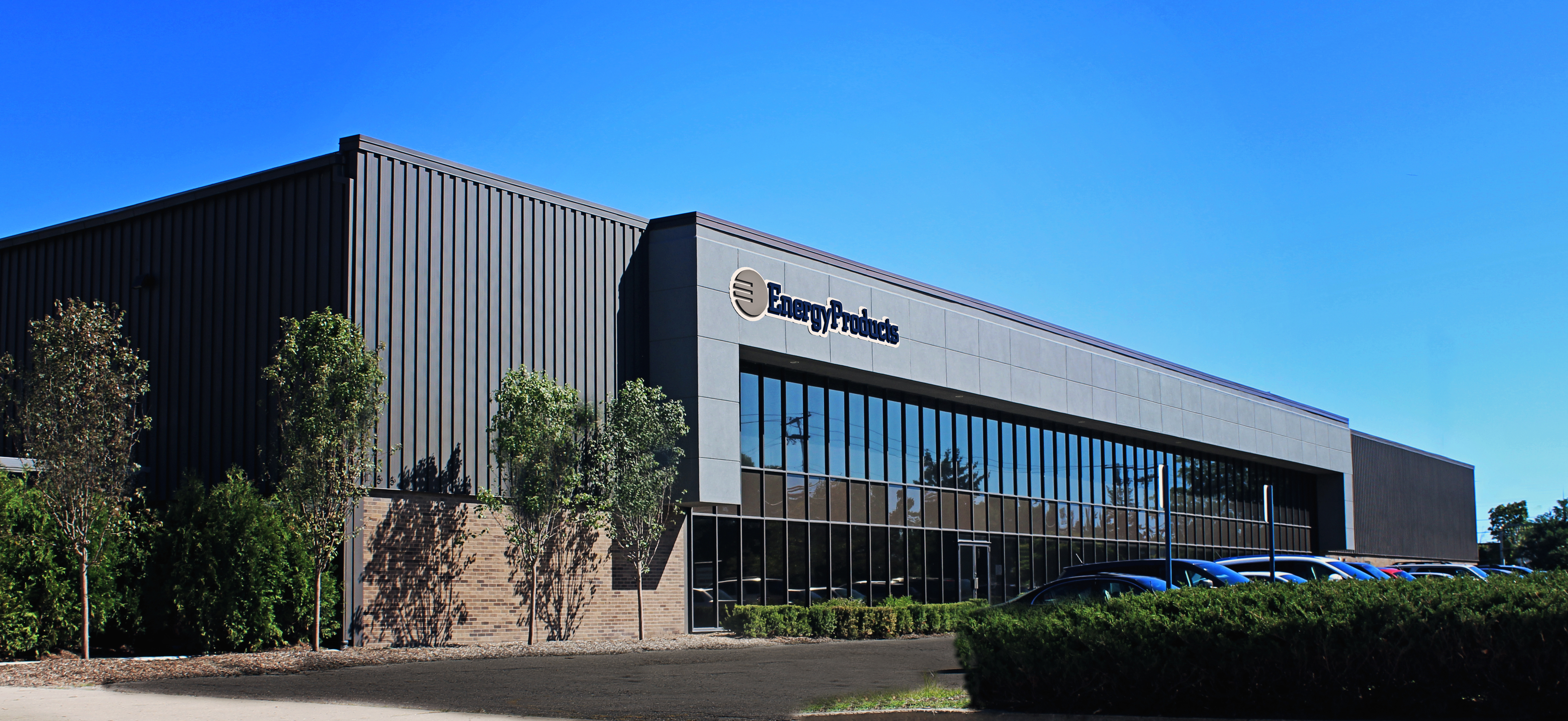
Energy Products Corporate Headquarters in Madison Heights, MI.

Energy Products operates out of 5 facilities in the Midwest. Headquartered in Madison Heights, MI, they also have operations in Grand Rapids, MI, Toledo, OH, New Castle, PA and Windsor Ontario, Canada.

In August 2013, Energy Products announced the purchase of a 117,000 square foot building in Madison Heights, MI. Energy Products completed the move to their new facility in May 2014.

== History ==
Energy Products was founded in 1991 and represented Hobart Battery Chargers and Materials Transportation Company throughout Michigan and Ohio. Their main function was designing, furnishing and installing battery rooms. They are a primary supplier to automotive companies and other large warehouses that utilize battery powered material handling equipment. In 1992, Energy Products was awarded a contract with two of the three major automotive companies based in Detroit to supply and service forklift batteries, chargers and to coordinate the battery recycling throughout the United States. As of 2013, Energy Products is still the primary supplier with two of the three automotive manufacturers and for several years was the primary supplier to all three automotive manufacturers. Energy Products services and supplies many non-automotive accounts with all there battery and charger needs as well.

In 1998, Kurt Smith co-founded Energy Products and Services (EP&S). The company, based out of the headquarters of Energy Products, focused on engineering furnish and installation of stationary UPS systems and building and maintaining the wireless infrastructure for the telecommunications industry. Customers included Nextel, Cingular, AT&T, Centennial Wireless and other wireless carriers. The company experienced rapid growth and quickly opened offices in Chicago, IL, Cleveland, OH, Atlanta, GA and Dallas, TX. Energy Products and Services sold to a group of outside investors November 2006.

In 2003, Energy Products expanded into automotive battery and deep cycle battery distribution serving the Midwest and east coast. Primary lines of batteries they carry in this category include: Deka, Exide, U.S. Battery, and Optima. They also distribute batteries marketed under their own Transcontinental Batteries brand as well as several other brands.

In January 2005, Energy Products purchased the assets of Motion Savers Inc., a material handling company that specialized in industrial and utility vehicles. This expanded Energy Products into the sales, service and parts distribution business for utility vehicles and related equipment. Energy Products represents Taylor-Dunn and Club Car utility vehicles.

In August 2005 Energy Products purchased the assets of K&K Cox LLC DBA the Armstrong Company in Grand Rapids, MI.

In May 2005 Energy Products purchased the assets of Commercial Battery, a large warehouse distributor of automotive type batteries with warehousing in New Castle, PA and North Hudington, PA.

In January 2008 Energy Products purchased the assets of DuBois Battery, a long established distributor of automotive batteries in mid-state PA.

In December 2012 Energy Products of Canada LTD was formed to service customers in the Windsor Ontario Canada market.

In 2014, Energy Products became a distributor of Advance Scrubbers and Sweepers for the eastern half of Michigan.

== Trojan Battery Master Distributor ==
In May 2015, Energy Products became a Master Distributor for Trojan Battery for the Michigan and Ohio markets.

== Charged battery delivery ==
In December 2001, Energy Products set up operations in Flint, MI to provide just-in-time delivery of fully charged forklift batteries to supply all the DC power necessary to support all the electric forklifts operating at General Motors Truck & Bus plant in Flint, MI and General Motors Powertrain in Bay City, MI. This operation allowed the GM plants to eliminate their battery charging rooms as well as the ownership of forklift batteries, chargers and related equipment and the associated maintenance. During the term of the agreement, Energy Products delivered over 550,000 lbs. of charged batteries every day and returned the discharged batteries to an off-site facility for recharging and maintenance.

During 2012, Energy Products developed and has patents pending for a more efficient means to change and charge forklift batteries while providing a just-in-time delivery of charged forklift batteries.

In January 2013, Energy Products began providing Charged Battery Delivery service to the Chrysler Windsor Assembly Plant in Windsor, Ontario, Canada.

== Electronic Controls ==
In 1988 Kurt Smith founded KH Smith Co and developed and had manufactured several electronic controls for material handling equipment many that are still in use today. Products include a CC-1292 a charger retrofit control for single phase chargers, the first charger monitoring system to indicate the next battery to put in service based upon state of charge known as the Multiple Charger Monitoring system MCM100 developed in 1990. Other products include one of the first battery data recorders developed in 1988 and used to record cycles and events on forklift batteries, the distribution was later sold to Anderson Power Products a leading international supplier of battery connectors. A Charge Discharge Controller CDC-886 was developed in 1986 and is used on industrial vehicles to extend the life of batteries by better controlling the charging and discharge of the batteries. KH Smith Co became part of Energy Products in 1991.
