= Inductive coupling =

Electrical circuit coupling using induction

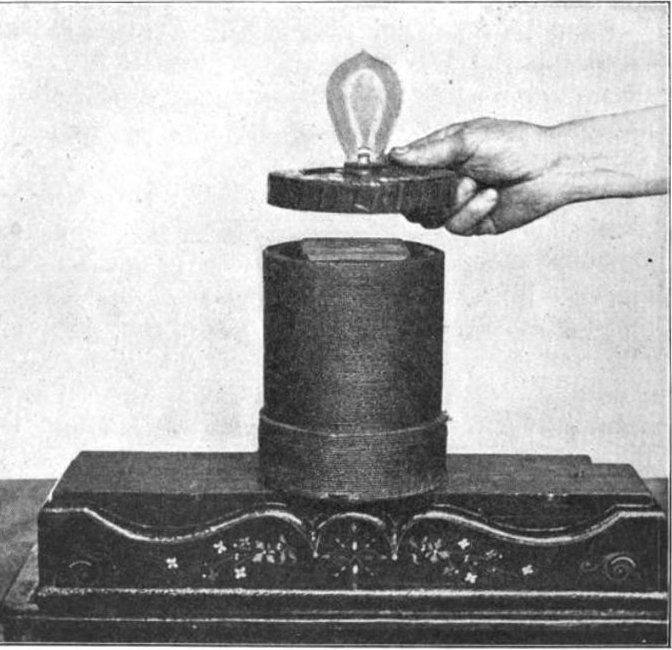
Example of inductive coupling, 1910. The bottom coil is connected to AC power. The alternating magnetic field through the top coil induces current in it which lights the lamp.

In electrical engineering, two conductors are said to be inductively coupled or magnetically coupled when they are configured in a way such that change in current through one wire induces a voltage across the ends of the other wire through electromagnetic induction. A changing current through the first wire creates a changing magnetic field around it by Ampere's circuital law. The changing magnetic field induces an electromotive force (EMF) voltage in the second wire by Faraday's law of induction. The amount of inductive coupling between two conductors is measured by their mutual inductance.

The coupling between two wires can be increased by winding them into coils and placing them close together on a common axis, so the magnetic field of one coil passes through the other coil. Coupling can also be increased by a magnetic core of a ferromagnetic material like iron or ferrite in the coils, which increases the magnetic flux. The two coils may be physically contained in a single unit, as in the primary and secondary windings of a transformer, or may be separated. Coupling may be intentional or unintentional. Unintentional inductive coupling can cause signals from one circuit to be induced into a nearby circuit, this is called cross-talk, and is a form of electromagnetic interference.

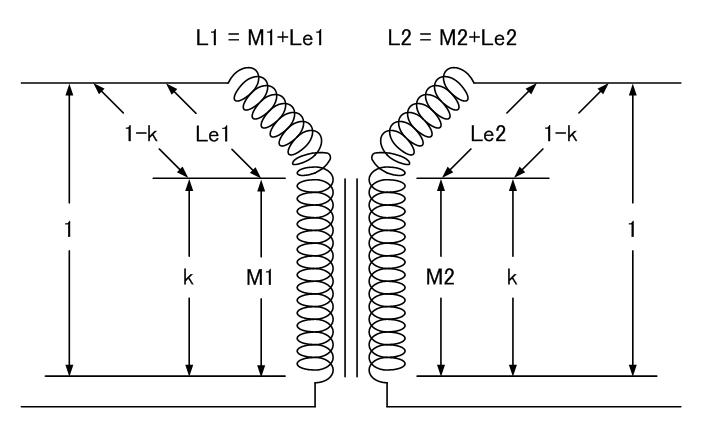
k is the coupling coefficient, Le1 and Le2 is the leakage inductance, M1 (M2) is the mutual inductance

An inductively coupled transponder consists of a solid state transceiver chip connected to a large coil that functions as an antenna. When brought within the oscillating magnetic field of a reader unit, the transceiver is powered up by energy inductively coupled into its antenna and transfers data back to the reader unit inductively.

Magnetic coupling between two magnets can also be used to mechanically transfer power without contact, as in the magnetic gear.

== Uses ==
Inductive coupling is widely used throughout electrical technology; examples include:

- Electric motors and generators
- Inductive charging products
- Induction cookers and induction heating systems
- Induction loop communication systems
- Metal detectors
- Transformers
- Wireless power transfer
- Testing:
  - Radio-frequency identification
  - Presence of voltage
Uses of inductive coupling

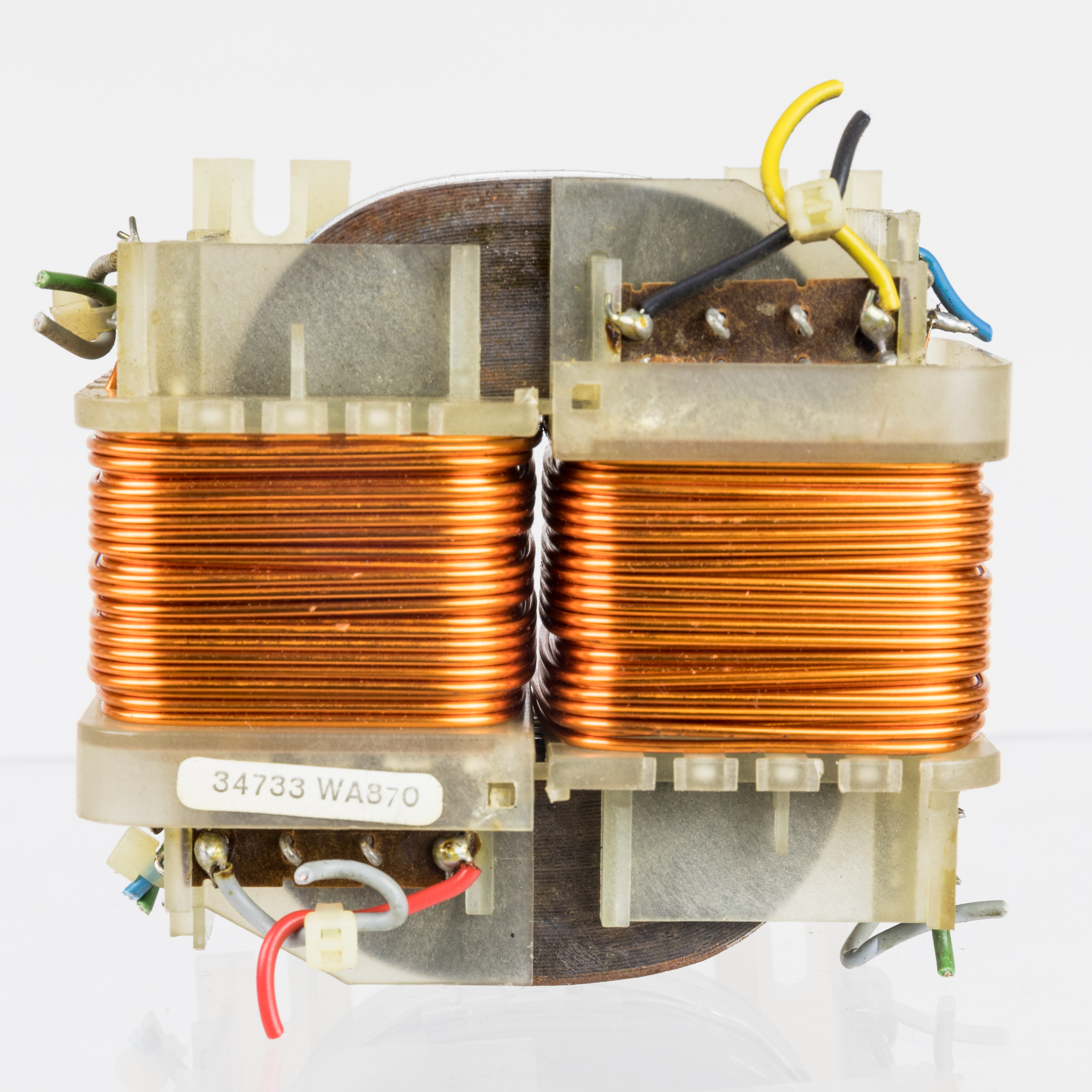
Power transformer transfers power from one winding to the other by inductive coupling

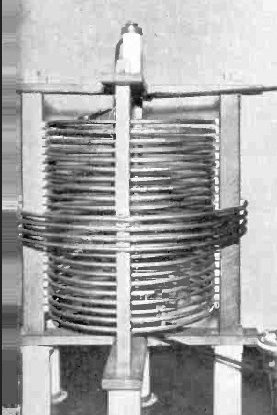
Antenna transformer inductively couples antenna of AM radio station to transmitter

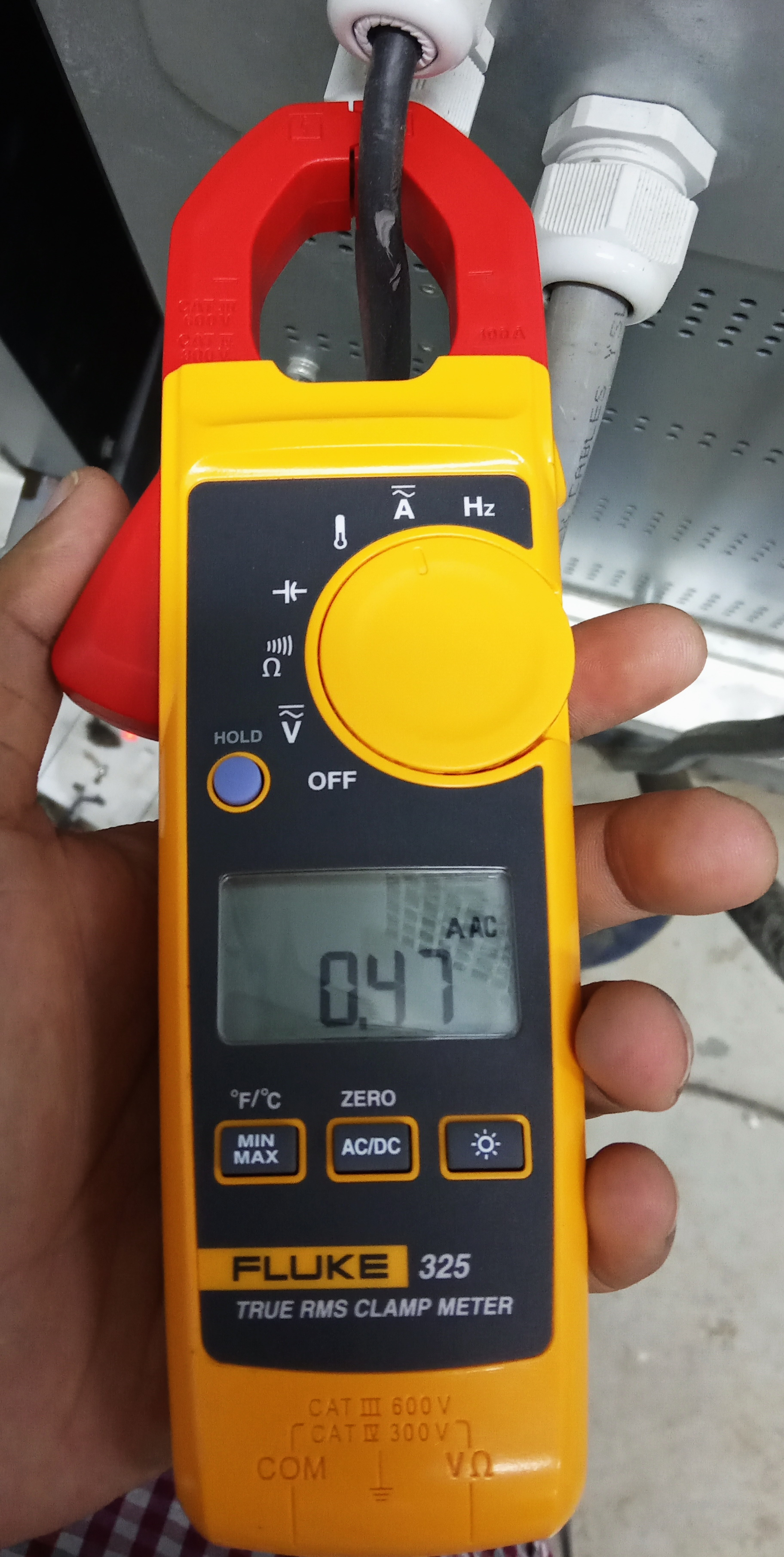
clamp ammeter measuring current by inductive coupling

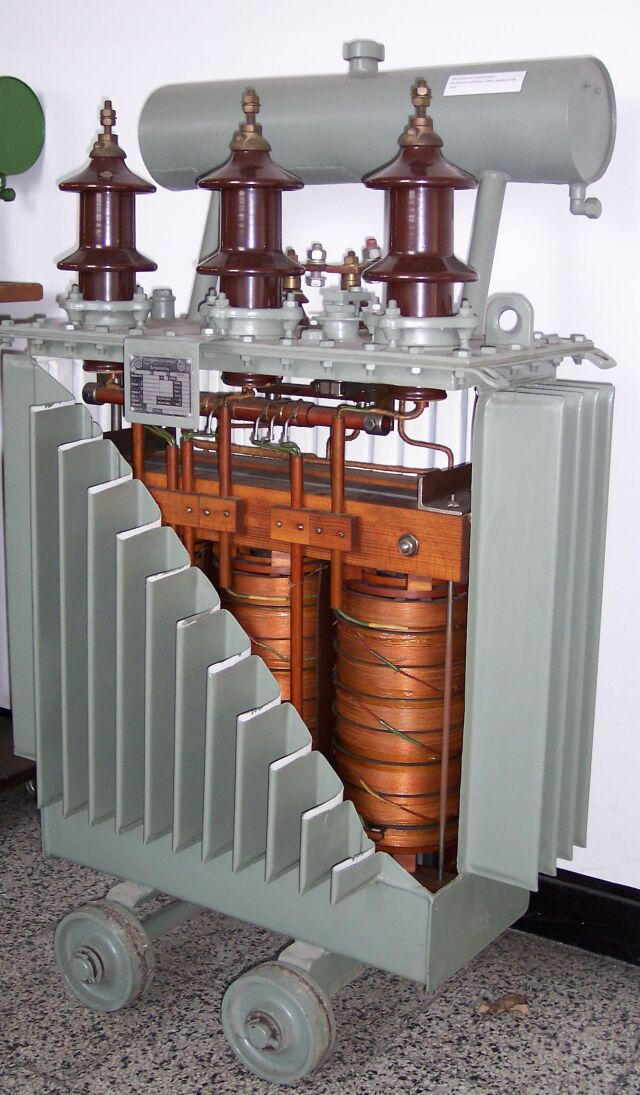
Utility transformer cutaway shows inductively coupled coils

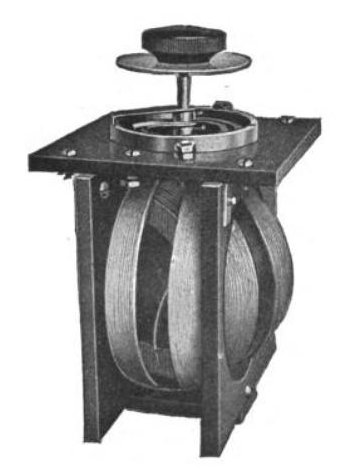
Variometer from radio allows inductive coupling to be varied

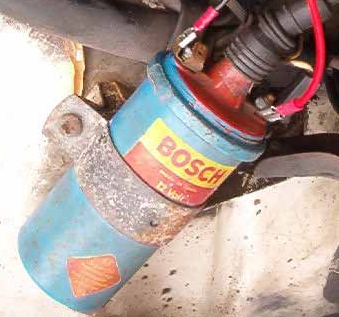
Ignition coil of truck produces high spark plug voltage by inductive coupling

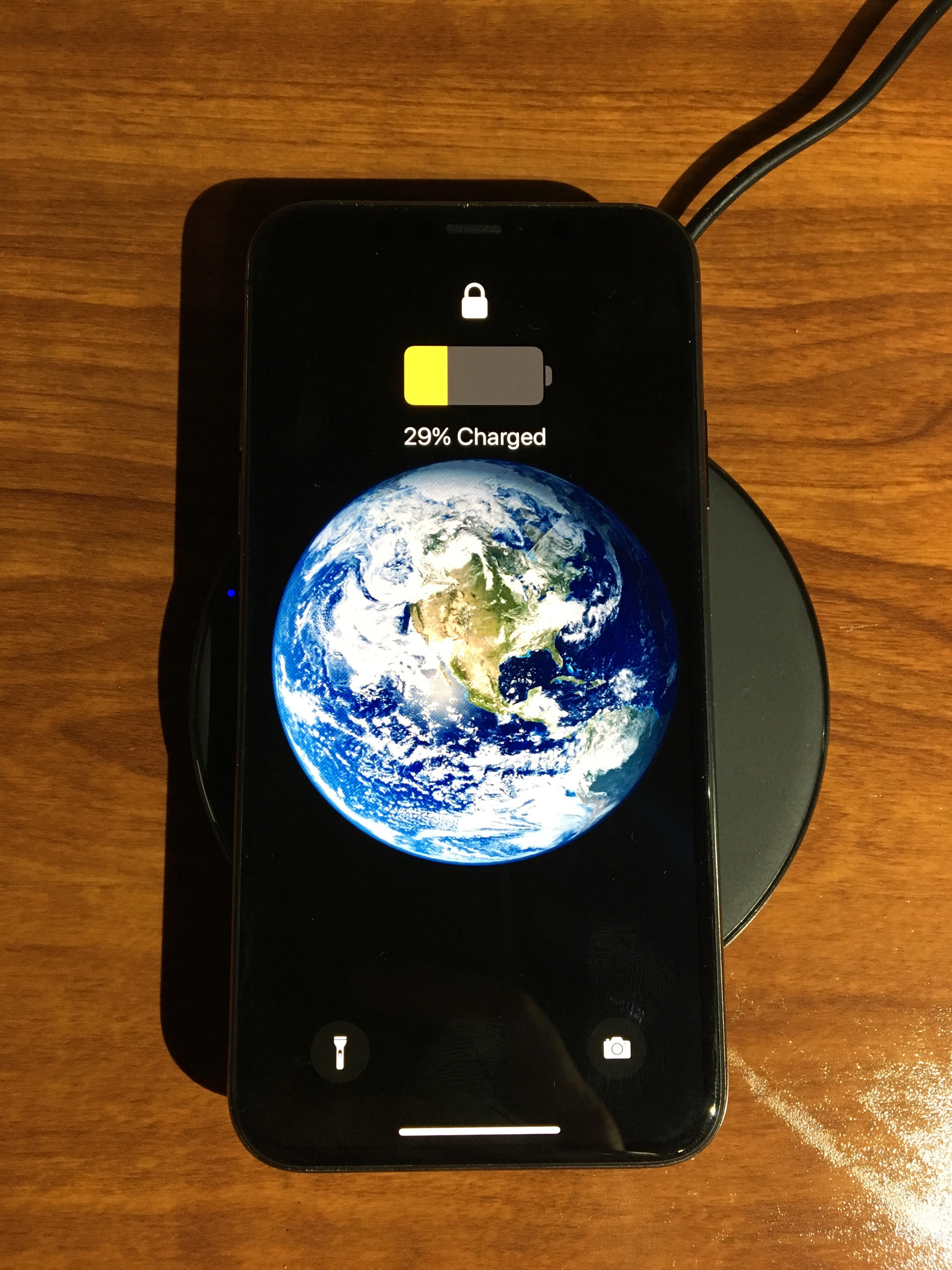
Inductive charger wirelessly charging a cellphone

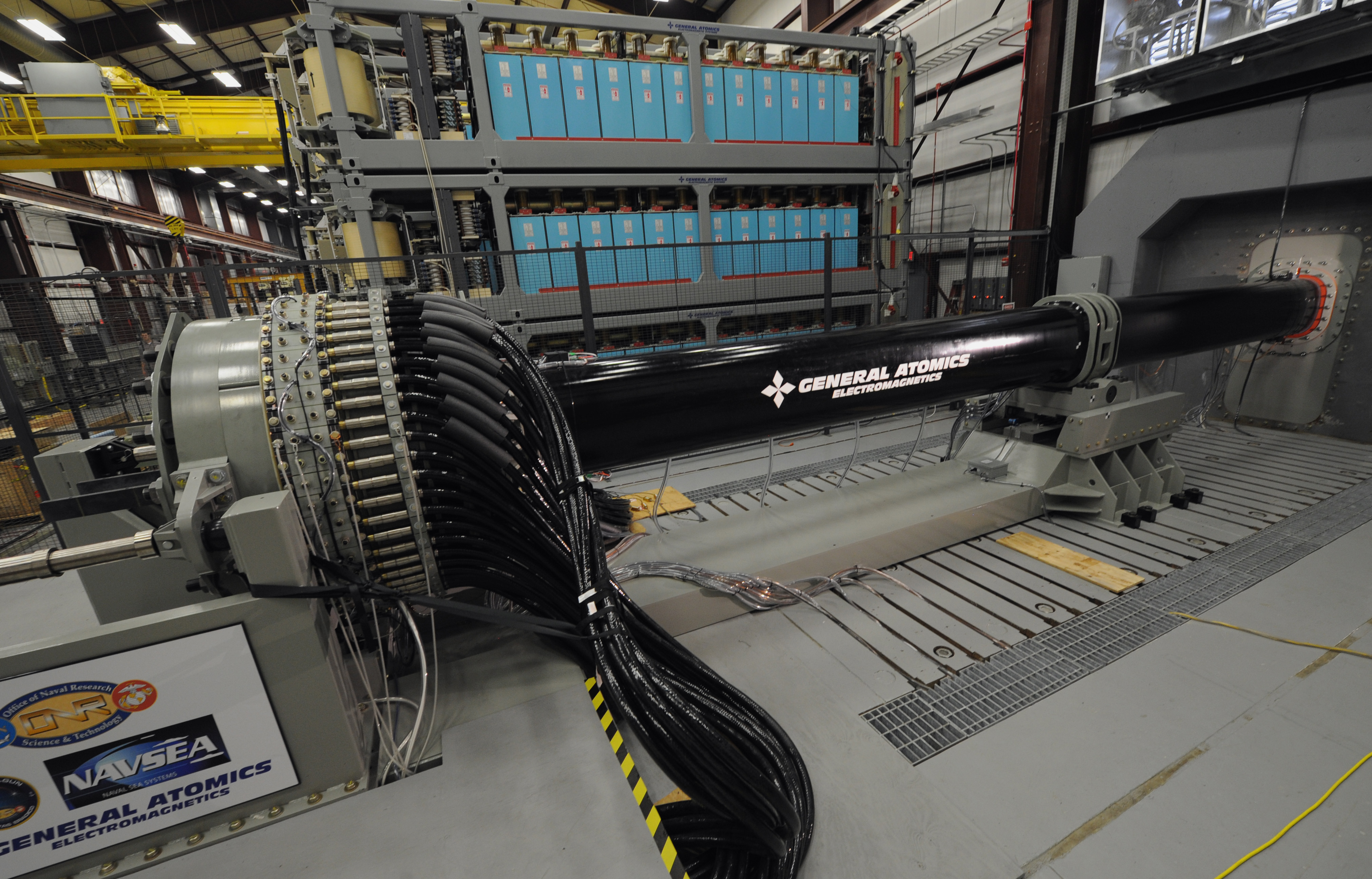
Prototype railgun accelerates a projectile by inductive coupling

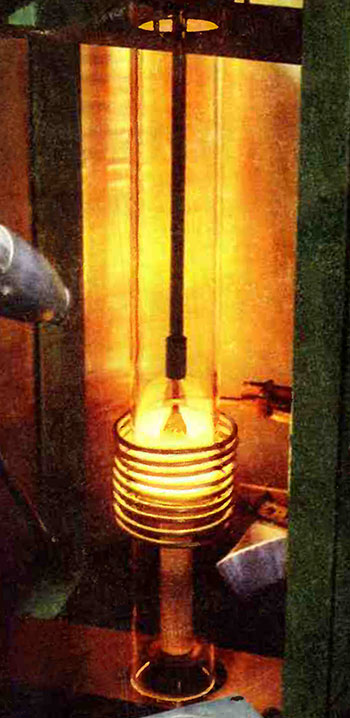
Induction furnace heats silicon by eddy currents

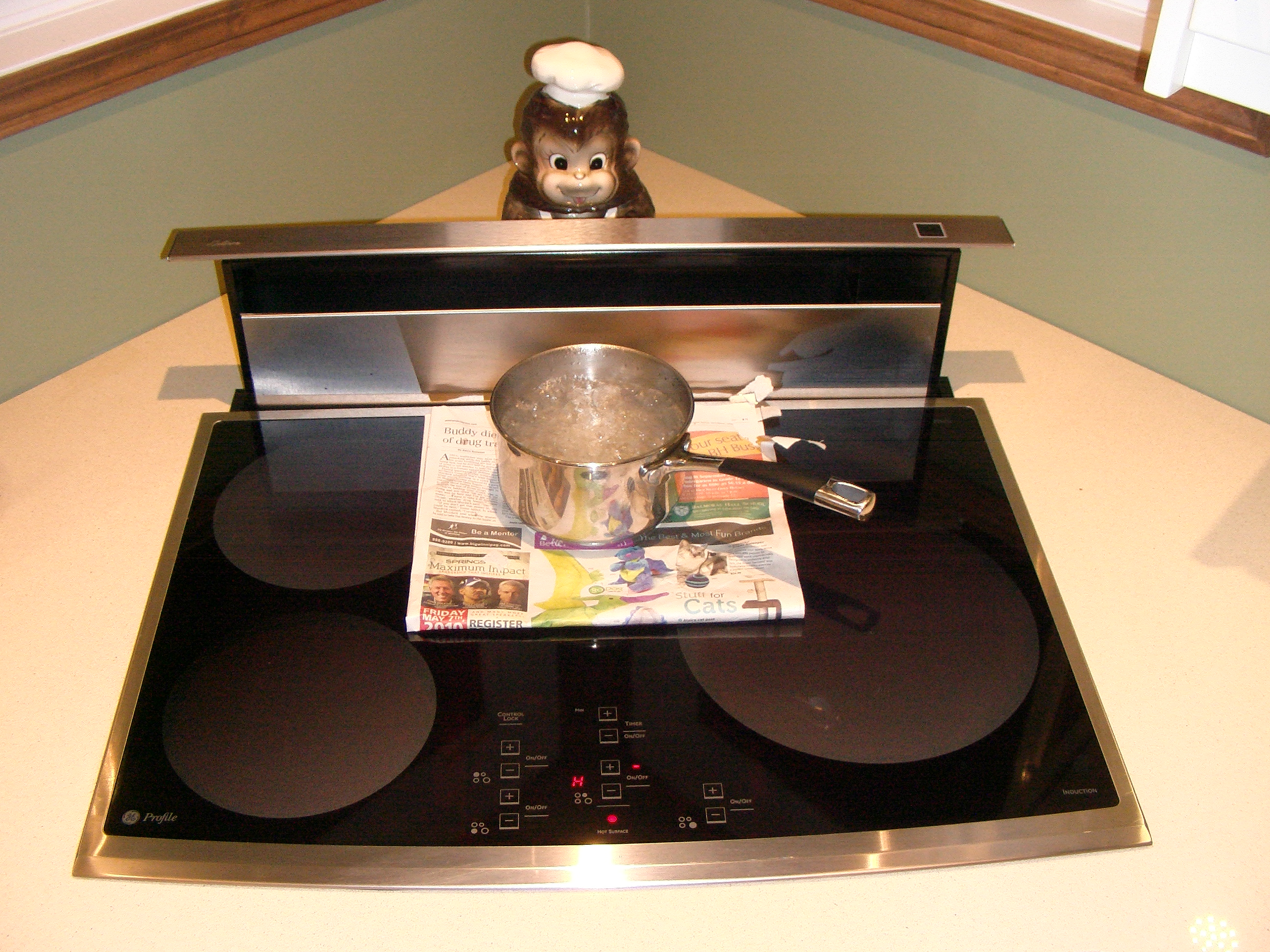
Induction stove boiling water by inductive coupling to pan

== Low-frequency induction ==
Low-frequency induction can be a dangerous form of inductive coupling when it happens inadvertently. For example, if a long-distance metal pipeline is installed along a right of way in parallel with a high-voltage power line, the power line can induce current on the pipe. Since the pipe is a conductor, insulated by its protective coating from the earth, it acts as a secondary winding for a long, drawn out transformer whose primary winding is the power line. Voltages induced on the pipe are then a hazard to people operating valves or otherwise touching metal parts of the metal pipeline.

Reducing low-frequency magnetic fields may be necessary when dealing with electronics, as sensitive circuits in close proximity to an instrument with a power transformer may pickup the mains frequency. Twisted wires (e.g. in networking cables) are an effective way of reducing the interference as signals induced in the successive twists cancel. Magnetic shielding is also an effective way of reducing unwanted inductive coupling, though moving the source of the magnetic field away from sensitive electronics is the simplest solution if possible.

Although induced currents can be harmful, they can also be helpful. Electrical distribution line engineers use inductive coupling to tap power for cameras on towers and at substations that allow remote monitoring of the facilities. Using this they can watch from anywhere and not need to worry about changing camera batteries or solar panel maintenance.
