= Wireless transmission =

Wireless transmission may refer to:

- Radio, the wireless transmission of signals through free space by radio waves instead of cables, like telegraphs
- Wireless communication communication, all types of non-wired communication
- Wireless power, the transmission of electrical energy without man-made conductors
