= Geometric diode =

Geometric diodes, also known as morphological diodes, use the shape of their structure and ballistic / quasi-ballistic electron transport to create diode behavior. Geometric diodes differ from all other forms of diodes because they do not rely on a depletion region or a potential barrier to create their diode behavior. Instead of a potential barrier, an asymmetry in the geometry of the material (that is on the order of the mean free path of the charge carrier) creates an asymmetry in forward vs reverse bias current (aka a diode).

== Creating a geometric diode ==
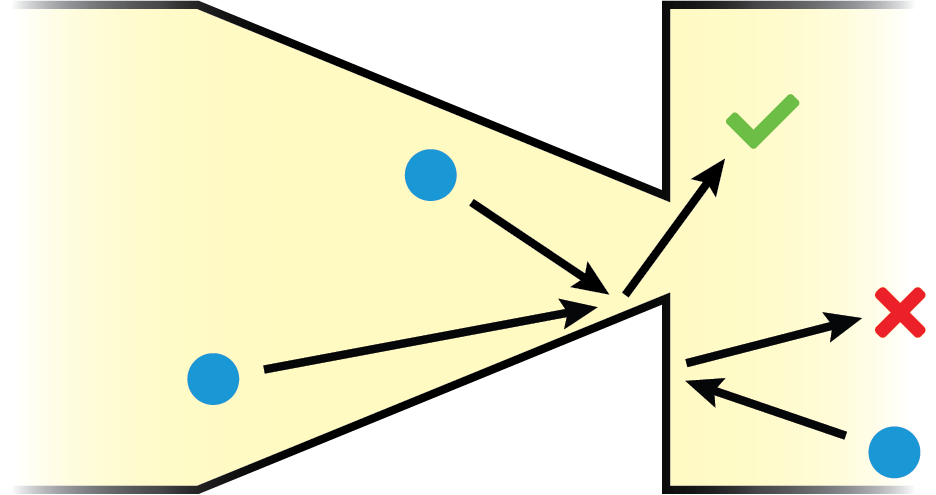
Simple geometric diodes schematic showing generic blue particles (these could be electrons or holes). From left to right the particles are funneled through the diode, but from right to left they are blocked.

Geometric diodes are formed from one continuous material (adding a caveat for 2D-electron gasses which are layered systems) that has an asymmetry in the structure on the order of the size of the charge carrier's mean free path (MFP). Typical room temperature MFPs range from single digit nanometers for metals up to tens or hundreds of nms for semiconductors, and even >1 micrometer in select systems. This means that to create a geometric diode, one must either use a high MFP material, or have a fabrication process that has nanometer precision in order to create the relevant geometries.

Geometric diodes are majority carrier devices that do not need a potential barrier. The diode behavior comes from an asymmetry in the shape of the structure (as shown in the figure). Quite simply geometric diodes can be thought of as funnels or lobster traps for charges; In one direction it is relatively easy for charges to flow, and in the reverse direction it is more difficult.

Additionally, it is ideal to have specular reflection of the charge carriers at the surface of the structure; however, this is not as critical as being small enough to be in a ballistic regime.

== Advantages and disadvantages of geometric diodes ==
=== Advantages ===
Because all other diodes create asymmetry in current flow through some form of a potential barrier, they necessarily have some degree of a turn-on voltage. Geometric diodes could theoretically achieve zero-bias turn-on voltage due to their lack of potential barrier. With zero-bias turn-on voltage, there is no DC bias that must be supplied to the device; therefor, geometric diodes could greatly reduce the power needed to operate a device. This could also be beneficial in that the diodes would be more sensitive to small signals. This is of course theoretical, and truly zero-bias diodes may be limited from being experimentally realized.

A second major advantage also stems from their lack of potential barrier and minority carriers. A potential barrier is a large source of capacitance in a diode. Capacitance serves to decrease a diodes frequency response by increasing its RC time. Geometric diodes lack of potential barrier means they can have ultra-low capacitance down to the attofarads. A geometric diode's frequency response is limited not by RC time or minority carrier mobility, but by the flight time of the charge carriers through the structural asymmetry. Therefore, geometric diodes can achieve frequency response into the THz.

The ability for a geometric diode's electronic properties to be tuned by the geometry of the structure, the surface coating on the structure, and the properties of the material used offer a level customization that is unrealized in any other diode system.

Principles learned from geometric diodes and ballistic systems will be used in understanding technology as devices become increasingly small and exist at or below charge carrier MFPs.

=== Disadvantages ===
The same benefits from the lack of potential barrier also come with their share of downsides. The main one being that the reverse bias current from a geometric diode can be quite high (anywhere from three to less than one orders of magnitude less than the forward bias current). Depending on the application, a high reverse bias can be tolerated though.

Typically geometric diodes are on the nano-scale, so that necessarily means that they have high resistances. However, depending on the fabrication process this can be mitigated by stringing many diodes in parallel.

Perhaps the largest hurdle for geometric diodes to overcome is the reliability of their fabrication and ability to scale it up. Geometric diodes are typically made using nanofabrication methods that do not scale up well, but with the increasing resolution of photolithography this may not be a problem for long.

== Experimental examples ==
Geometric diodes are linked to the phenomena of electron ratchets, and their histories are intermingled.

=== 2DEG ===
Early work on geometric diodes used 2D electron gasses (2DEG) at cryogenic temperatures because these material systems have a very long charge carrier MFP. One of the most studied structures is a four-terminal geometry that either had a single antidot at the center, or an array of antidots that forces charges down instead of up when current is supplied from either the left or right. This system was initially demonstrated at cryogenic temperatures, but then was able to operate at room-temperature and rectify signals of 50 GHz.

=== Graphene ===
The four-terminal geometries have also been created in graphene and function at room-temperature. Additionally, a different, two-terminal geometry resembling the simple geometric diode schematic was demonstrated in 2013. Optimum design for the ballistic diode based on graphene field-effect transistors in 2021 by Van Huy Nguyen. This work showed rectification speeds at THz frequencies.

=== Nanowires ===
Geometric diodes formed from etched Silicon nanowires were shown to operate at room-temperature in April 2020. This work highlights the tunability of geometric diodes by thoroughly studying the effects of geometry on the diode's electronic properties. The work also demonstrated rectification up to an instrument-limited 40 GHz.

== See also ==
- Rectenna
- semiconductor diode
- rectifier
