= Wi-Charge =

Israeli company

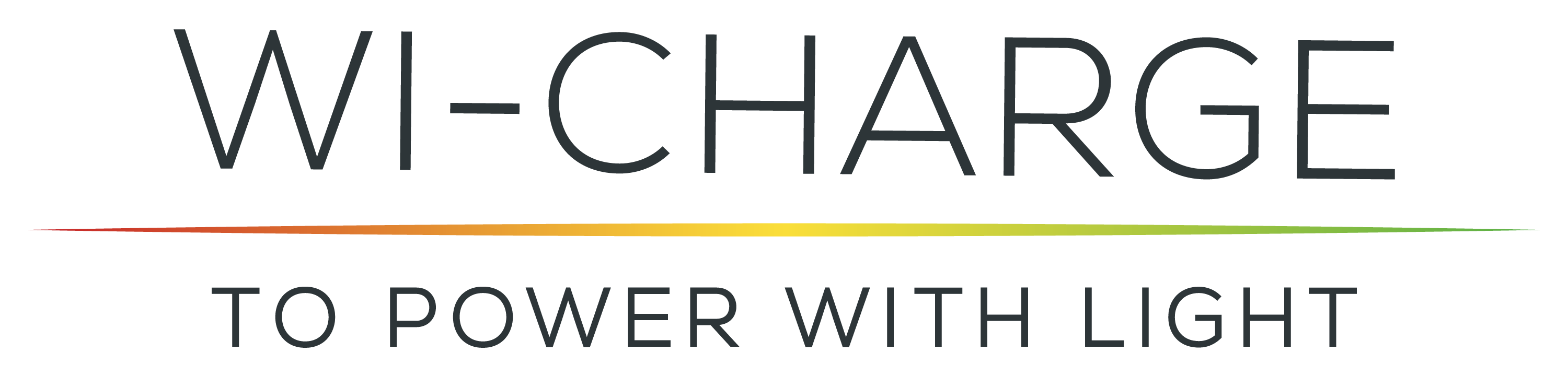
- Industry: Technology
- Founded: 2012
- Headquarters: Rehovot, Israel
- Services: Technology for long-range wireless power
- Website: http://wi-charge.com

Wi-Charge was an Israeli company that developed technology and products for far-field wireless power transfer using focused infrared beams.

== History ==
Wi-Charge was founded in 2012 by Victor Vaisleib, Ori Mor and Ortal Alpert. The company is developing a unique far-field wireless power technology based on infrared laser beams. In 2015, Wi-Charge demonstrated its first prototype capable of charging small electronic devices. In 2017, the company claimed to obtain compliance with international safety standards. During CES 2018, Wi-Charge demonstrated simultaneous charging of multiple devices from a single transmitter.

== Technology ==
Wi-Charge claimed to deliver power using focused beams of invisible infrared light. The system consists of a transmitter and a receiver. Transmitter connects to a standard power outlet and converts electricity into infrared laser beam. Receivers use a miniature photo-voltaic cell to convert transmitted light into electrical power. Receivers can be embedded into a device or connected into an existing charging port. The transmitter automatically identifies chargeable receivers and starts charging. Several devices can charge at the same time. According to Wi-Charge it can deliver several watts of power to a device at several meters away. The core technology is based on a distributed laser resonator which is formed by the retroreflectors within the transmitter and the receiver. This unique concept allows the charging of multiple devices without any moving components and if an opaque object enters one of the beams the corresponding power transfer is turned off automatically.

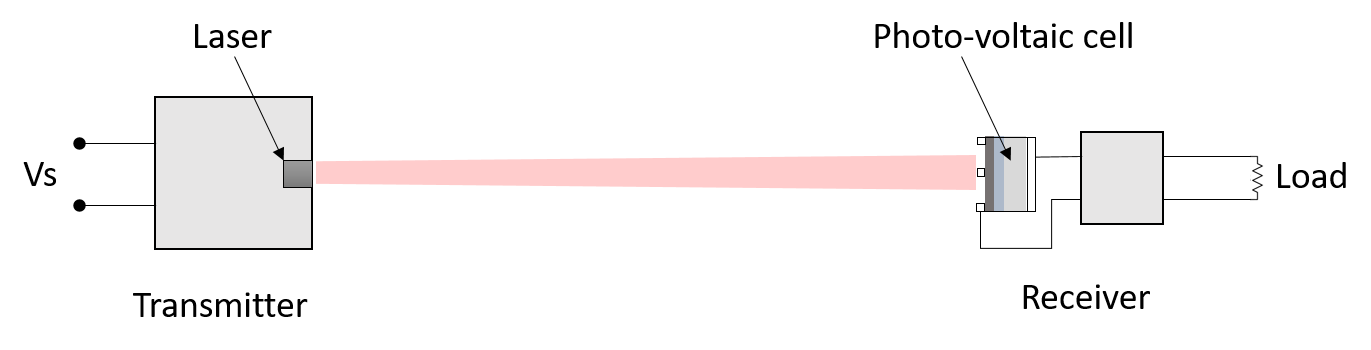
A schematic description of typical wireless power transfer using a laser beam. A transmitter converts electricity into a light beam and a receiver on the other side converts the light back to electricity.

== Safety ==
Because laser power in the single-digit watt range is used for energy transmission, ensuring product safety is crucial. Wi-Charge has stated that its technology complies with the IEC 60825-1 International Safety Standard (laser safety). According to this standard it is a Class 1 product.

"Class 1: Lasers that are safe under reasonably foreseeable conditions of operation, including the use of optical instruments for intrabeam viewing."

In April 2019 the company announced that it has earned UL safety approval. According to Wi-Charge, the system transmits power using a straight, narrow beam. The beam is contained into a small spot and all the energy falls inside the receiver. Therefore, nobody is exposed to radiated energy as long as the path between the transmitter and the receiver is not crossed. If the path between transmitter and receiver is blocked, transmission stops immediately. Once line of sight is restored, charging resumes. Wi-Charge claims that this mechanism ensures that energy exposure to people, animals or unrelated objects is always below the maximum permissible exposure (MPE):

"Sending energy over a distance, a beam always diverges, which is a bad thing as too little power is going in the right direction, and too much power splits and goes elsewhere. With RF, only relatively humble distances can be achieved, with a power capacity about a fraction of a Watt, limited by the maximum level of exposure allowed for safety. Shorter wavelength beams maintain their integrity better. With an infrared laser, we have a practically non-diverging beam able to deliver its entire power content onto a small receiver"

== Advantages and Limitations ==
Some consider the necessity of a direct line of sight between the transmitter and the receiver to be a disadvantage of using laser to deliver power. So, devices that are hidden (such as smartphone in your pocket or medical implant) cannot be charged using this technology. However, some see line of sight as an advantage because when line of sight is not used, there is potential for greater leakage of undesired energy into the environment, and there is full control over where the energy is going.

Companies that integrate Wi-Charge usually embed a rechargeable battery or super-capacitor in their products. This allows to both overcome periods where new charge is not received, as well as to deliver momentary larger bursts of energy than the average charging rate.

Wi-Charge does claim that using infrared light for long-range wireless power has advantages over using radio frequency or ultrasound because of two main reasons:

- Physics. Because of their very short wavelength, infrared beams diverge (see Diffraction) much less than technologies with longer wavelengths. This means that the diameter of the beam can remain small at a distance from the power transmitter. Thus, a receiver of small physical size can still capture all or most of the light energy.
- Safety. The allowable Specific absorption rate imposes stronger limits on radio frequency and ultrasound energy transmission.

== See also ==
- Economy of Israel
- Start-up Nation
