= Wireless power transfer =

Electrical transmission without physical connection

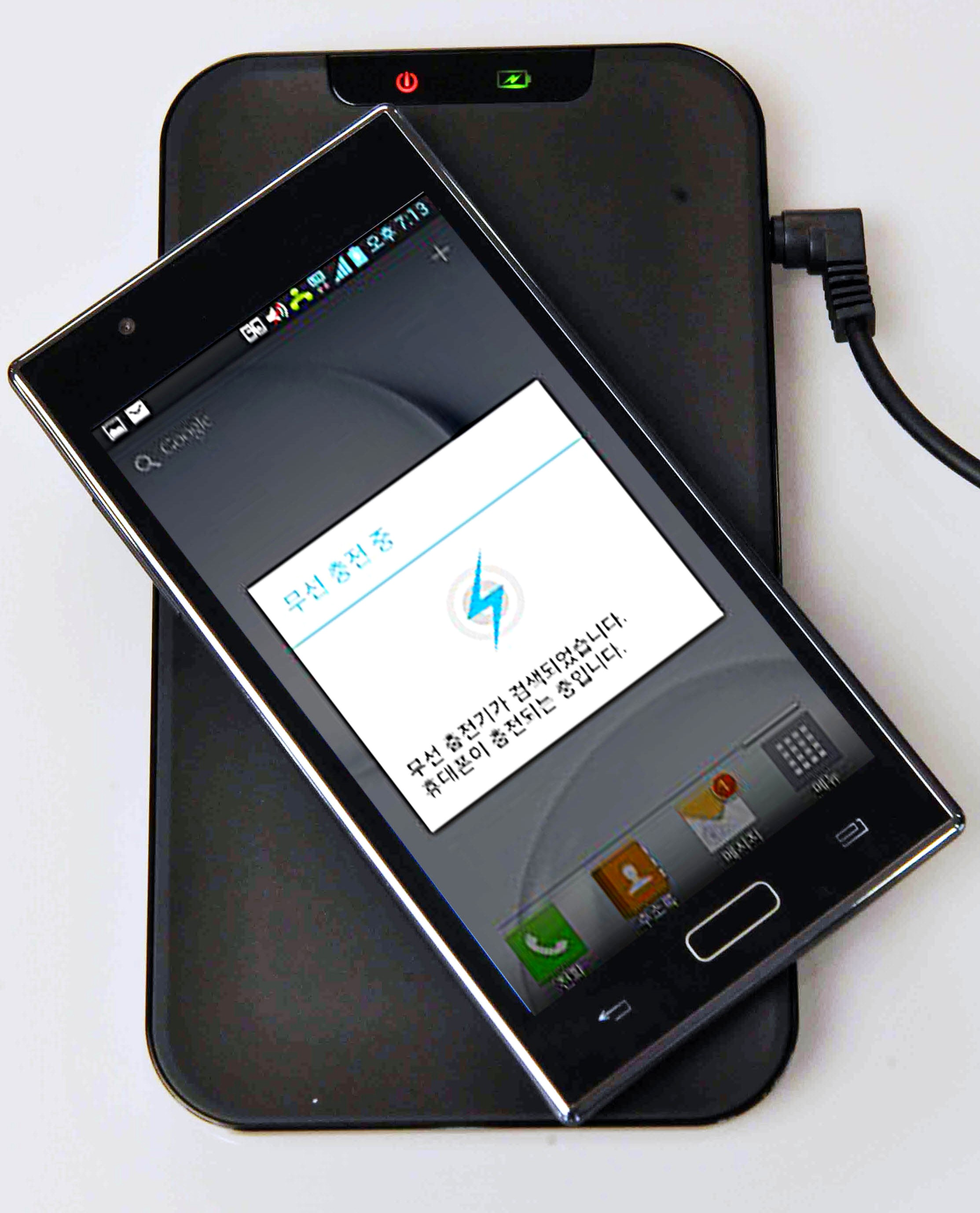
Inductive charging pad for a smartphone as an example of near-field wireless transfer. When the phone is set on the pad, a coil in the pad creates a magnetic field which induces a current in another coil, in the phone, charging its battery.

Wireless power transfer (WPT; also wireless energy transmission or WET) is the transmission of electrical energy without wires as a physical link. In a wireless power transmission system, an electrically powered transmitter device generates a time-varying electromagnetic field that transmits power across space to a receiver device; the receiver device extracts power from the field and supplies it to an electrical load. The technology of wireless power transmission can eliminate the use of the wires and batteries, thereby increasing the mobility, convenience, and safety of an electronic device for all users. Wireless power transfer is useful to power electrical devices where interconnecting wires are inconvenient, hazardous, or impossible.

Wireless power techniques mainly fall into two categories: Near and far field. In near field or non-radiative techniques, power is transferred over short distances by magnetic fields using inductive coupling between coils of wire, or by electric fields using capacitive coupling between metal electrodes. Inductive coupling is the most widely used wireless technology; its applications include charging handheld devices like phones and electric toothbrushes, RFID tags, induction cooking, and wirelessly charging or continuous wireless power transfer in implantable medical devices like artificial cardiac pacemakers, or electric vehicles. In far-field or radiative techniques, also called power beaming, power is transferred by beams of electromagnetic radiation, like microwaves or laser beams. These techniques can transport energy longer distances but must be aimed at the receiver. Proposed applications for this type include solar power satellites and wireless powered drone aircraft.

An important issue associated with all wireless power systems is limiting the exposure of people and other living beings to potentially injurious electromagnetic fields.

== Elementary overview ==
Generic block diagram of a wireless power system

Wireless power transfer is a generic term for technologies for transmitting energy by means of electromagnetic fields. The technologies differ in the distance over which they can transfer power efficiently, whether the transmitter must be aimed (directed) at the receiver, and in the type of electromagnetic energy they use: time varying electric fields, magnetic fields, radio waves, microwaves, infrared or visible light waves.

In general a wireless power system consists of a "transmitter" device connected to a source of power such as a mains power line, which converts the power to a time-varying electromagnetic field, and one or more "receiver" devices which receive the power and convert it back to DC or AC electric current which is used by an electrical load. At the transmitter the input power is converted to an oscillating electromagnetic field by some type of "antenna" device. The word "antenna" is used loosely here; it may be a coil of wire which generates a magnetic field, a metal plate which generates an electric field, an antenna which radiates radio waves, or a laser which generates light. A similar antenna or coupling device at the receiver converts the oscillating fields to an electric current. An important parameter that determines the type of waves is the frequency, which determines the wavelength.

Wireless power uses the same fields and waves as wireless communication devices like radio, another familiar technology that involves electrical energy transmitted without wires by electromagnetic fields, used in cellphones, radio and television broadcasting, and WiFi. In radio communication the goal is the transmission of information, so the amount of power reaching the receiver is not so important, as long as it is sufficient that the information can be received intelligibly. In wireless communication technologies only tiny amounts of power reach the receiver. In contrast, with wireless power transfer the amount of energy received is the important thing, so the efficiency (fraction of transmitted energy that is received) is the more significant parameter. For this reason, wireless power technologies are likely to be more limited by distance than wireless communication technologies.

Wireless power transfer may be used to power up wireless information transmitters or receivers. This type of communication is known as wireless powered communication (WPC). When the harvested power is used to supply the power of wireless information transmitters, the network is known as Simultaneous Wireless Information and Power Transfer (SWIPT); whereas when it is used to supply the power of wireless information receivers, it is known as a Wireless Powered Communication Network (WPCN).

== History ==
=== 19th century developments and dead ends ===
The 19th century saw many developments of theories, and counter-theories on how electrical energy might be transmitted. In 1826, André-Marie Ampère discovered a connection between current and magnets. Michael Faraday described in 1831 with his law of induction the electromotive force was driving a current in a conductor loop by a time-varying magnetic flux. Transmission of electrical energy without wires was observed by many inventors and experimenters, but lack of a coherent theory attributed these phenomena vaguely to electromagnetic induction. A concise explanation of these phenomena would come from the 1860s Maxwell's equations by James Clerk Maxwell, establishing a theory that unified electricity and magnetism to electromagnetism, predicting the existence of electromagnetic waves as the "wireless" carrier of electromagnetic energy. Around 1884 John Henry Poynting defined the Poynting vector and gave Poynting's theorem, which describe the flow of power across an area within electromagnetic radiation and allow for a correct analysis of wireless power transfer systems. This was followed on by Heinrich Rudolf Hertz' 1888 validation of the theory, which included the evidence for radio waves.

During the same period two schemes of wireless signaling were put forward by William Henry Ward (1871) and Mahlon Loomis (1872) that were based on the erroneous belief that there was an electrified atmospheric stratum accessible at low altitude. Both inventors' patents noted this layer connected with a return path using "Earth currents"' would allow for wireless telegraphy as well as supply power for the telegraph, doing away with artificial batteries, and could also be used for lighting, heat, and motive power. A more practical demonstration of wireless transmission via conduction came in Amos Dolbear's 1879 magneto electric telephone that used ground conduction to transmit over a distance of a quarter of a mile.

=== Nikola Tesla ===
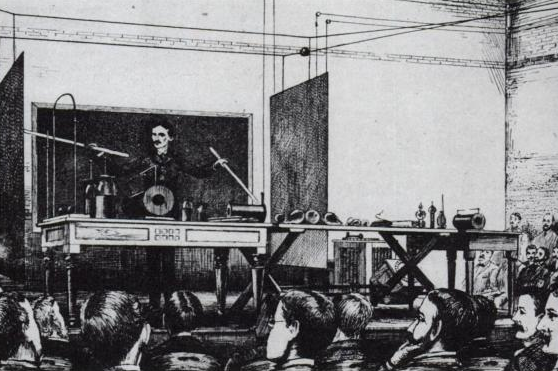
Tesla demonstrating wireless transmission by "electrostatic induction" during an 1891 lecture at Columbia College. The two metal sheets are connected to a Tesla coil oscillator, which applies high-voltage radio frequency alternating current. An oscillating electric field between the sheets ionizes the low-pressure gas in the two long Geissler tubes in his hands, causing them to glow in a manner similar to neon tubes.

After 1890, inventor Nikola Tesla experimented with transmitting power by inductive and capacitive coupling using spark-excited radio frequency resonant transformers, now called Tesla coils, which generated high AC voltages. Early on he attempted to develop a wireless lighting system based on near-field inductive and capacitive coupling and conducted a series of public demonstrations where he lit Geissler tubes and even incandescent light bulbs from across a stage. He found he could increase the distance at which he could light a lamp by using a receiving LC circuit tuned to resonance with the transmitter's LC circuit. using resonant inductive coupling. Tesla failed to make a commercial product out of his findings but his resonant inductive coupling method is now widely used in electronics and is currently being applied to short-range wireless power systems.

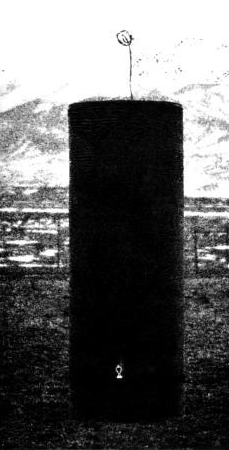
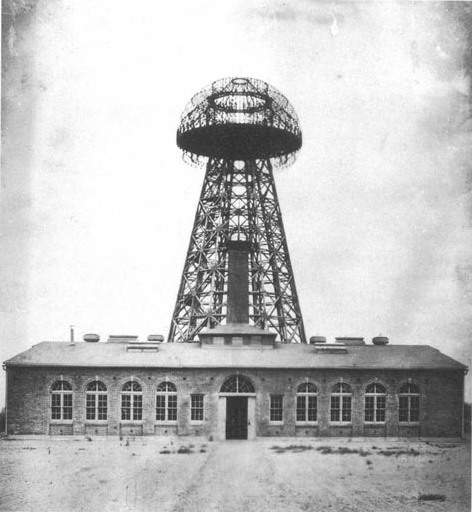
(left) Experiment in resonant inductive transfer by Tesla at Colorado Springs 1899. The coil is in resonance with Tesla's magnifying transmitter nearby, powering the light bulb at bottom. (right) Tesla's unsuccessful Wardenclyffe power station.

Tesla went on to develop a wireless power distribution system that he hoped would be capable of transmitting power long distance directly into homes and factories. Early on he seemed to borrow from the ideas of Mahlon Loomis, proposing a system composed of balloons to suspend transmitting and receiving electrodes in the air above 30,000 feet (9,100 m) in altitude, where he thought the pressure would allow him to send high voltages (millions of volts) long distances. To further study the conductive nature of low pressure air he set up a test facility at high altitude in Colorado Springs during 1899. Experiments he conducted there with a large coil operating in the megavolts range, as well as observations he made of the electronic noise of lightning strikes, led him to conclude incorrectly that he could use the entire globe of the Earth to conduct electrical energy. The theory included driving alternating current pulses into the Earth at its resonant frequency from a grounded Tesla coil working against an elevated capacitance to make the potential of the Earth oscillate. Tesla thought this would allow alternating current to be received with a similar capacitive antenna tuned to resonance with it at any point on Earth with very little power loss. His observations also led him to believe a high voltage used in a coil at an elevation of a few hundred feet would "break the air stratum down", eliminating the need for miles of cable hanging on balloons to create his atmospheric return circuit. Tesla would go on the next year to propose a "World Wireless System" that was to broadcast both information and power worldwide. In 1901, at Shoreham, New York he attempted to construct a large high-voltage wireless power station, now called Wardenclyffe Tower, but by 1904 investment dried up and the facility was never completed.

=== Post-war developments ===
Before World War II, little progress was made in wireless power transmission. Radio was developed for communication uses, but could not be used for power transmission since the relatively low-frequency radio waves spread out in all directions and little energy reached the receiver. In radio communication, at the receiver, an amplifier intensifies a weak signal using energy from another source. For power transmission, efficient transmission required transmitters that could generate higher-frequency microwaves, which can be focused in narrow beams towards a receiver.

The development of microwave technology during World War II, such as the klystron and magnetron tubes and parabolic antennas, made some radiative (far-field) methods practical for the first time, and the first long-distance wireless power transmission was achieved in the 1960s by William C. Brown. In 1964, Brown invented the rectenna which could efficiently convert microwaves to DC power, and in 1964 demonstrated it with the first wireless-powered aircraft, a model helicopter powered by microwaves beamed from the ground.

== Field regions ==
Electric and magnetic fields are created by charged particles in matter such as electrons. A stationary charge creates an electrostatic field in the space around it. A steady current of charges (direct current, DC) creates a static magnetic field around it. These fields contain energy, but cannot carry power because they are static. However time-varying fields can carry power. Accelerating electric charges, such as are found in an alternating current (AC) of electrons in a wire, create time-varying electric and magnetic fields in the space around them. These fields can exert oscillating forces on the electrons in a receiving "antenna", causing them to move back and forth. These represent alternating current which can be used to power a load.

The oscillating electric and magnetic fields surrounding moving electric charges in an antenna device can be divided into two regions, depending on distance D_{range} from the antenna. The boundary between the regions is somewhat vaguely defined. The fields have different characteristics in these regions, and different technologies are used for transferring power:

- Near-field or nonradiative region: This means the area within about 1 wavelength (λ) of the antenna. In this region the oscillating electric and magnetic fields are separate and power can be transferred via electric fields by capacitive coupling (electrostatic induction) between metal electrodes, or via magnetic fields by inductive coupling (electromagnetic induction) between coils of wire. These fields are not radiative, meaning the energy stays within a short distance of the transmitter. If there is no receiving device or absorbing material within their limited range to "couple" to, no power leaves the transmitter. The range of these fields is short, and depends on the size and shape of the "antenna" devices, which are usually coils of wire. The fields, and thus the power transmitted, decrease exponentially with distance, so if the distance between the two "antennas" D_{range} is much larger than the diameter of the "antennas" D_{ant} very little power will be received. Therefore, these techniques cannot be used for long range power transmission. Resonance, such as resonant inductive coupling, can increase the coupling between the antennas greatly, allowing efficient transmission at somewhat greater distances, although the fields still decrease exponentially. Therefore the range of near-field devices is conventionally divided into two categories:
  - Short range: up to about one antenna diameter: D_{range} ≤ D_{ant}. This is the range over which ordinary nonresonant capacitive or inductive coupling can transfer practical amounts of power.
  - Mid-range: up to 10 times the antenna diameter: D_{range} ≤ 10 D_{ant}. This is the range over which resonant capacitive or inductive coupling can transfer practical amounts of power.
- Far-field or radiative region: Beyond about 1 wavelength (λ) of the antenna, the electric and magnetic fields are perpendicular to each other and propagate as an electromagnetic wave; examples are radio waves, microwaves, or light waves. This part of the energy is radiative, meaning it leaves the antenna whether or not there is a receiver to absorb it. The portion of energy which does not strike the receiving antenna is dissipated and lost to the system. The amount of power emitted as electromagnetic waves by an antenna depends on the ratio of the antenna's size D_{ant} to the wavelength of the waves λ, which is determined by the frequency: λ = c/f. At low frequencies f where the antenna is much smaller than the size of the waves, D_{ant} << λ, very little power is radiated. Therefore near-field devices, which use lower frequencies, radiate almost none of their energy as electromagnetic radiation. Antennas about the same size as the wavelength D_{ant} ≈ λ such as monopole or dipole antennas, radiate power efficiently, but the electromagnetic waves are radiated in all directions (omnidirectionally), so if the receiving antenna is far away, only a small amount of the radiation will hit it. Therefore, these can be used for short range, inefficient power transmission but not for long range transmission. However, unlike fields, electromagnetic radiation can be focused by reflection or refraction into beams. By using a high-gain antenna or optical system which concentrates the radiation into a narrow beam aimed at the receiver, it can be used for long range power transmission. From the Rayleigh criterion, to produce the narrow beams necessary to focus a significant amount of the energy on a distant receiver, an antenna must be much larger than the wavelength of the waves used: D_{ant} >> λ = c/f. Practical beam power devices require wavelengths in the centimeter region or lower, corresponding to frequencies above 1 GHz, in the microwave range or above.

Wireless power technologies by range
Technology	Range	Directivity	Frequency	Antenna devices	Current and/or possible future applications
Inductive coupling	Short	Low	Hz – MHz	Wire coils	Electric tooth brush and razor battery charging, induction stovetops and industrial heaters.
Resonant inductive coupling	Mid-	Low	kHz – GHz	Tuned wire coils, lumped element resonators	Charging portable devices (Qi), biomedical implants, electric vehicles, powering buses, trains, MAGLEV, RFID, smartcards.
Capacitive coupling	Short	Low	kHz – MHz	Metal plate electrodes	Charging portable devices, power routing in large-scale integrated circuits, Smartcards, biomedical implants.
Magnetodynamic coupling	Short	N.A.	Hz	Rotating magnets	Charging electric vehicles, biomedical implants.
Microwaves	Long	High	GHz	Parabolic dishes, phased arrays, rectennas	Solar power satellite, powering drone aircraft, charging wireless devices
Light waves	Long	High	≥THz	Lasers, photocells, lenses	Charging portable devices, powering drone aircraft.

== Near-field (nonradiative) techniques ==
At large relative distance, the near-field components of electric and magnetic fields are approximately quasi-static oscillating dipole fields. These fields decrease with the cube of distance: (D_{range} / D_{ant})^{−3} Since power is proportional to the square of the field strength, the power transferred decreases as (D_{range} / D_{ant})^{−6}. or 60 dB per decade. In other words, if far apart, increasing the distance between the two antennas tenfold causes the power received to decrease by a factor of 10^{6} = 1000000. As a result, inductive and capacitive coupling can be used only for short-range power transfer, within a few times the diameter of the antenna device D_{ant}. Unlike in a radiative system where the maximum radiation occurs when the dipole antennas are oriented transverse to the direction of propagation, with dipole fields the maximum coupling occurs when the dipoles are oriented longitudinally.

=== Inductive coupling ===
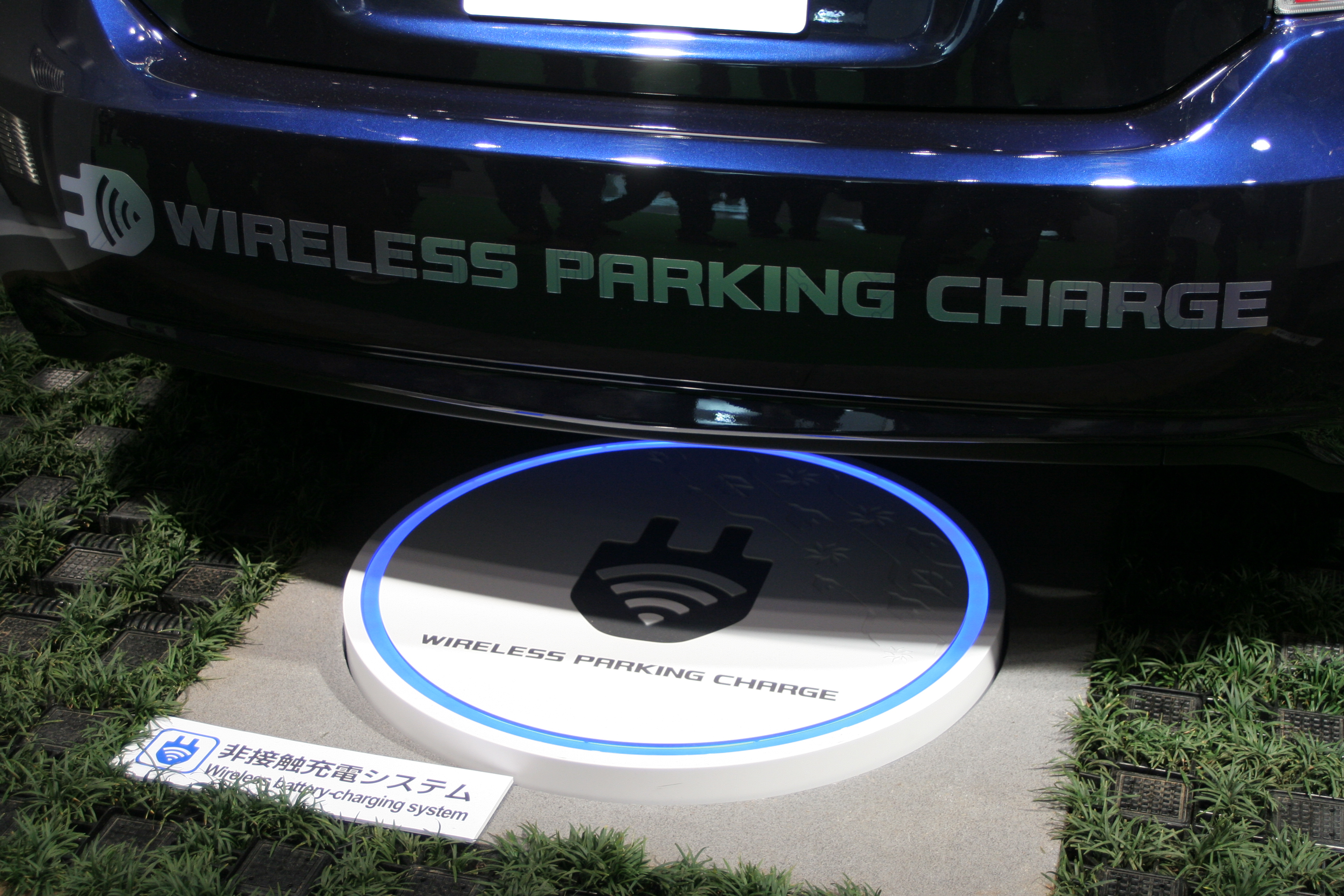
Prototype inductive electric car charging system at 2011 Tokyo Auto Show

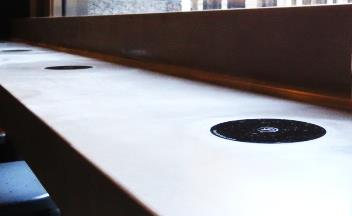
Powermat inductive charging spots in a coffee shop. Customers can set their phones and computers on them to recharge.

Wireless powered access card

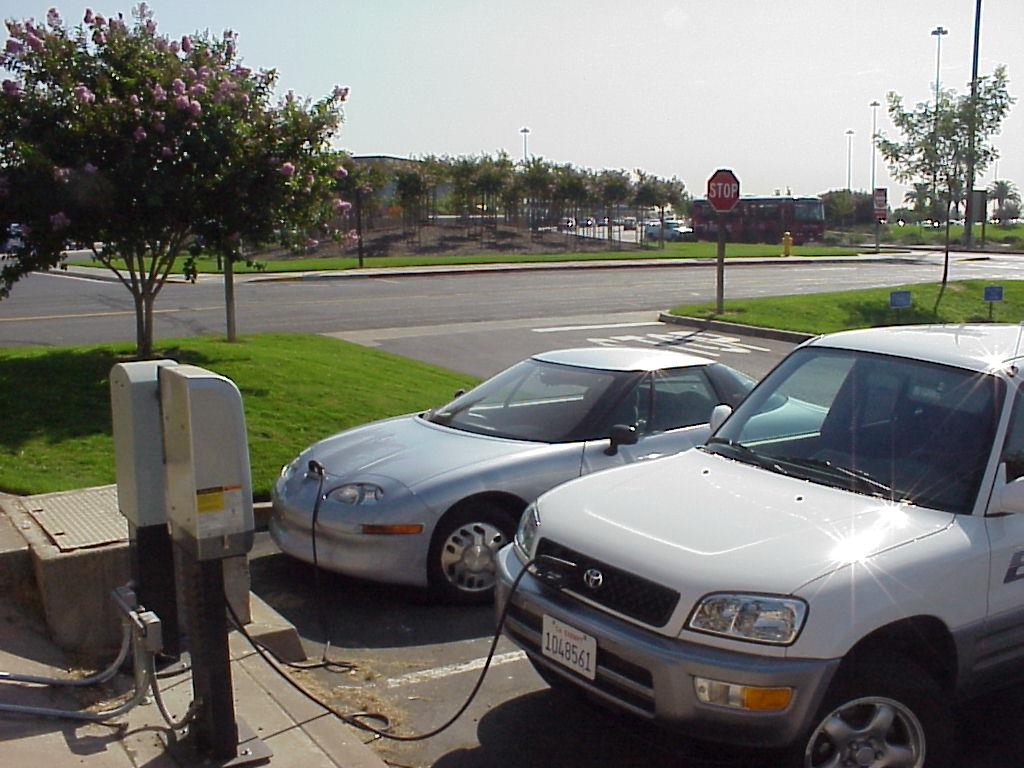
GM EV1 and Toyota RAV4 EV inductively charging at a now-obsolete Magne Charge station

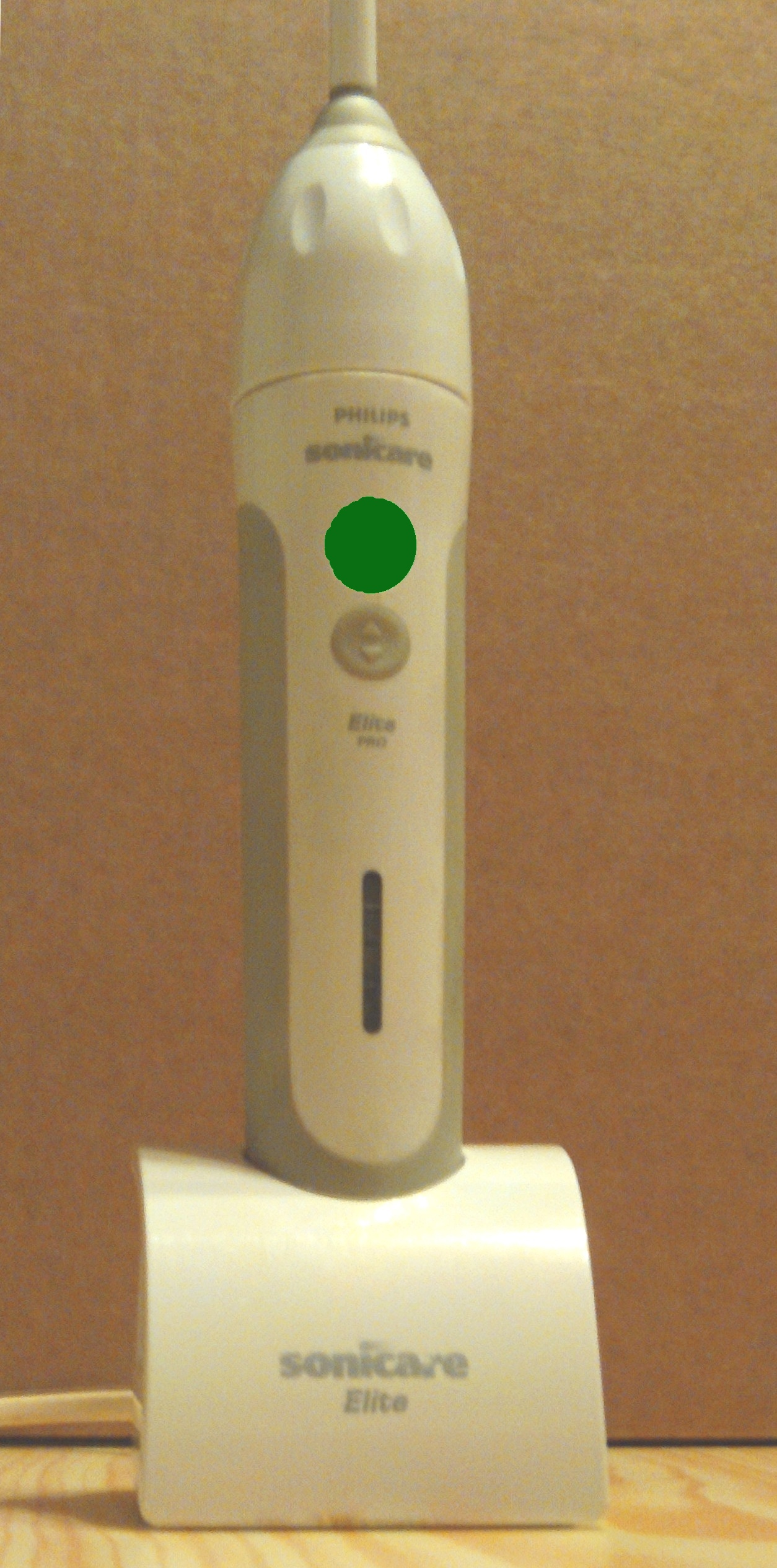
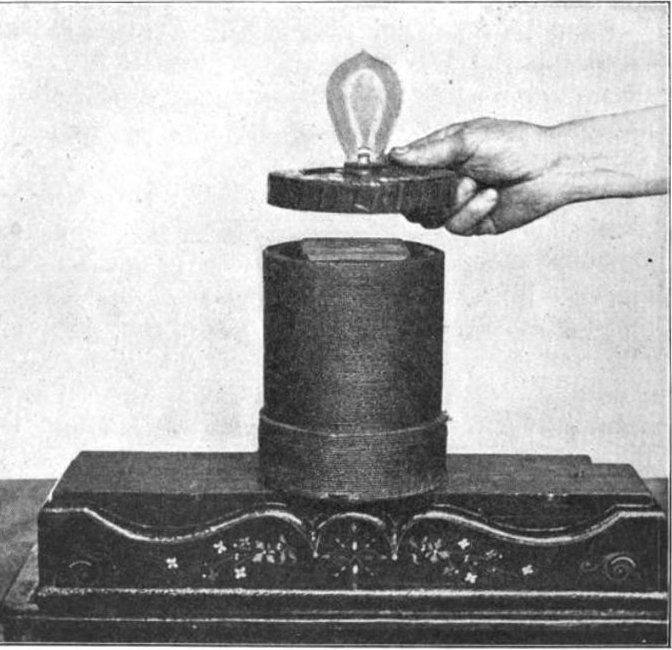
Left: modern inductive power transfer, an electric toothbrush charger. A coil in the stand produces a magnetic field, inducing an alternating current in a coil in the toothbrush, which is rectified to charge the batteries. Right: a light bulb powered wirelessly by induction, in 1910.

Generic block diagram of an inductive wireless power system

In inductive coupling (electromagnetic induction or inductive power transfer, IPT), power is transferred between coils of wire by a magnetic field. The transmitter and receiver coils together form a transformer. An alternating current (AC) through the transmitter coil (L1) creates an oscillating magnetic field (B) by Ampere's law. The magnetic field passes through the receiving coil (L2), where it induces an alternating EMF (voltage) by Faraday's law of induction, which creates an alternating current in the receiver. The induced alternating current may either drive the load directly, or be rectified to direct current (DC) by a rectifier in the receiver, which drives the load. A few systems, such as electric toothbrush charging stands, work at 50/60 Hz so AC mains current is applied directly to the transmitter coil, but in most systems an electronic oscillator generates a higher frequency AC current which drives the coil, because transmission efficiency improves with frequency.

Inductive coupling is the oldest and most widely used wireless power technology, and virtually the only one so far which is used in commercial products. It is used in inductive charging stands for cordless appliances used in wet environments such as electric toothbrushes and shavers, to reduce the risk of electric shock. Another application area is "transcutaneous" recharging of biomedical prosthetic devices implanted in the human body, such as cardiac pacemakers, to avoid having wires passing through the skin. It is also used to charge electric vehicles such as cars and to either charge or power transit vehicles like buses and trains.

However the fastest growing use is wireless charging pads to recharge mobile and handheld wireless devices such as laptop and tablet computers, computer mouse, cellphones, digital media players, and video game controllers. In the United States, the Federal Communications Commission (FCC) provided its first certification for a wireless transmission charging system in December 2017.

The power transferred increases with frequency and the mutual inductance $M$ between the coils, which depends on their geometry and the distance $D_\text{range}$ between them. A widely used figure of merit is the coupling coefficient $k\; =\; M/\sqrt{L_1 L_2}$. This dimensionless parameter is equal to the fraction of magnetic flux through the transmitter coil $L1$ that passes through the receiver coil $L2$ when L2 is open circuited. If the two coils are on the same axis and close together so all the magnetic flux from $L1$ passes through $L2$, $k = 1$ and the link efficiency approaches 100%. The greater the separation between the coils, the more of the magnetic field from the first coil misses the second, and the lower $k$ and the link efficiency are, approaching zero at large separations. The link efficiency and power transferred is roughly proportional to $k^2$. In order to achieve high efficiency, the coils must be very close together, a fraction of the coil diameter $D_\text{ant}$, usually within centimeters, with the coils' axes aligned. Wide, flat coil shapes are usually used, to increase coupling. Ferrite "flux confinement" cores can confine the magnetic fields, improving coupling and reducing interference to nearby electronics, but they are heavy and bulky so small wireless devices often use air-core coils.

Ordinary inductive coupling can achieve high efficiency only when the coils are very close together, usually adjacent. In most modern inductive systems resonant inductive coupling is used, in which the efficiency is increased by using resonant circuits. This can achieve high efficiencies at greater distances than nonresonant inductive coupling.

=== Resonant inductive coupling ===
Resonant inductive coupling (electrodynamic coupling, strongly coupled magnetic resonance) is a form of inductive coupling in which power is transferred by magnetic fields (B, green) between two resonant circuits (tuned circuits), one in the transmitter and one in the receiver. Each resonant circuit consists of a coil of wire connected to a capacitor, or a self-resonant coil or other resonator with internal capacitance. The two are tuned to resonate at the same resonant frequency. The resonance between the coils can greatly increase coupling and power transfer, analogously to the way a vibrating tuning fork can induce sympathetic vibration in a distant fork tuned to the same pitch.

Nikola Tesla first discovered resonant coupling during his pioneering experiments in wireless power transfer around the turn of the 20th century, but the possibilities of using resonant coupling to increase transmission range has only recently been explored. In 2007 a team led by Marin Soljačić at MIT used two coupled tuned circuits each made of a 25 cm self-resonant coil of wire at 10 MHz to achieve the transmission of 60 W of power over a distance of 2 meters (6.6 ft) (8 times the coil diameter) at around 40% efficiency.

The concept behind resonant inductive coupling systems is that high Q factor resonators exchange energy at a much higher rate than they lose energy due to internal damping. Therefore, by using resonance, the same amount of power can be transferred at greater distances, using the much weaker magnetic fields out in the peripheral regions ("tails") of the near fields. Resonant inductive coupling can achieve high efficiency at ranges of 4 to 10 times the coil diameter (D_{ant}). This is called "mid-range" transfer, in contrast to the "short range" of nonresonant inductive transfer, which can achieve similar efficiencies only when the coils are adjacent. Another advantage is that resonant circuits interact with each other so much more strongly than they do with nonresonant objects that power losses due to absorption in stray nearby objects are negligible.

A drawback of resonant coupling theory is that at close ranges when the two resonant circuits are tightly coupled, the resonant frequency of the system is no longer constant but "splits" into two resonant peaks, so the maximum power transfer no longer occurs at the original resonant frequency and the oscillator frequency must be tuned to the new resonance peak.

Resonant technology is currently being widely incorporated in modern inductive wireless power systems. One of the possibilities envisioned for this technology is area wireless power coverage. A coil in the wall or ceiling of a room might be able to wirelessly power lights and mobile devices anywhere in the room, with reasonable efficiency. An environmental and economic benefit of wirelessly powering small devices such as clocks, radios, music players and remote controls is that it could drastically reduce the 6 billion batteries disposed of each year, a large source of toxic waste and groundwater contamination.

A study for the Swedish military found that 85 kHz systems for dynamic wireless power transfer for vehicles can cause electromagnetic interference at a radius of up to 300 kilometers.

=== Capacitive coupling ===
Capacitive coupling also referred to as electric coupling, makes use of electric fields for the transmission of power between two electrodes (an anode and cathode) forming a capacitance for the transfer of power. In capacitive coupling (electrostatic induction), the conjugate of inductive coupling, energy is transmitted by electric fields between electrodes such as metal plates. The transmitter and receiver electrodes form a capacitor, with the intervening space as the dielectric. An alternating voltage generated by the transmitter is applied to the transmitting plate, and the oscillating electric field induces an alternating potential on the receiver plate by electrostatic induction, which causes an alternating current to flow in the load circuit. The amount of power transferred increases with the frequency the square of the voltage, and the capacitance between the plates, which is proportional to the area of the smaller plate and (for short distances) inversely proportional to the separation.

Capacitive wireless power systems

Bipolar coupling

Monopolar coupling

Capacitive coupling has only been used practically in a few low power applications, because the very high voltages on the electrodes required to transmit significant power can be hazardous, and can cause unpleasant side effects such as noxious ozone production. In addition, in contrast to magnetic fields, electric fields interact strongly with most materials, including the human body, due to dielectric polarization. Intervening materials between or near the electrodes can absorb the energy, in the case of humans possibly causing excessive electromagnetic field exposure. However capacitive coupling has a few advantages over inductive coupling. The field is largely confined between the capacitor plates, reducing interference, which in inductive coupling requires heavy ferrite "flux confinement" cores. Also, alignment requirements between the transmitter and receiver are less critical. Capacitive coupling has recently been applied to charging battery powered portable devices as well as charging or continuous wireless power transfer in biomedical implants, and is being considered as a means of transferring power between substrate layers in integrated circuits.

Two types of circuit have been used:

- Transverse (bipolar) design: In this type of circuit, there are two transmitter plates and two receiver plates. Each transmitter plate is coupled to a receiver plate. The transmitter oscillator drives the transmitter plates in opposite phase (180° phase difference) by a high alternating voltage, and the load is connected between the two receiver plates. The alternating electric fields induce opposite phase alternating potentials in the receiver plates, and this "push-pull" action causes current to flow back and forth between the plates through the load. A disadvantage of this configuration for wireless charging is that the two plates in the receiving device must be aligned face to face with the charger plates for the device to work.
- Longitudinal (unipolar) design: In this type of circuit, the transmitter and receiver have only one active electrode, and either the ground or a large passive electrode serves as the return path for the current. The transmitter oscillator is connected between an active and a passive electrode. The load is also connected between an active and a passive electrode. The electric field produced by the transmitter induces alternating charge displacement in the load dipole through electrostatic induction.

Resonance can also be used with capacitive coupling to extend the range. At the turn of the 20th century, Nikola Tesla did the first experiments with both resonant inductive and capacitive coupling.

=== Electrodynamic wireless power transfer ===
An electrodynamic wireless power transfer (EWPT) system utilizes a receiver with a mechanically resonating or rotating permanent magnet. When subjected to a time-varying magnetic field, the mechanical motion of the resonating magnet is converted into electricity by one or more electromechanical transduction schemes (e.g. electromagnetic/induction, piezoelectric, or capacitive). In contrast to inductive coupling systems which usually use high frequency magnetic fields, EWPT uses low-frequency magnetic fields (<1 kHz), which safely pass through conductive media and have higher human field exposure limits (~2 mTrms at 1 kHz), showing promise for potential use in wirelessly recharging biomedical implants. For EWPT devices having identical resonant frequencies, the magnitude of power transfer is entirely dependent on critical coupling coefficient, denoted by $k$, between the transmitter and receiver devices. For coupled resonators with same resonant frequencies, wireless power transfer between the transmitter and the receiver is spread over three regimes – under-coupled, critically coupled and over-coupled. As the critical coupling coefficient increases from an under-coupled regime ($k<k_{crit}$) to the critical coupled regime, the optimum voltage gain curve grows in magnitude (measured at the receiver) and peaks when $k=k_{crit}$ and then enters into the over-coupled regime where $k>k_{crit}$ and the peak splits into two. This critical coupling coefficient is demonstrated to be a function of distance between the source and the receiver devices.

=== Magnetodynamic coupling ===
In this method, power is transmitted between two rotating armatures, one in the transmitter and one in the receiver, which rotate synchronously, coupled together by a magnetic field generated by permanent magnets on the armatures. The transmitter armature is turned either by or as the rotor of an electric motor, and its magnetic field exerts torque on the receiver armature, turning it. The magnetic field acts like a mechanical coupling between the armatures. The receiver armature produces power to drive the load, either by turning a separate electric generator or by using the receiver armature itself as the rotor in a generator.

This device has been proposed as an alternative to inductive power transfer for noncontact charging of electric vehicles. A rotating armature embedded in a garage floor or curb would turn a receiver armature in the underside of the vehicle to charge its batteries. It is claimed that this technique can transfer power over distances of 10 to 15 cm (4 to 6 inches) with high efficiency, over 90%. Also, the low frequency stray magnetic fields produced by the rotating magnets produce less electromagnetic interference to nearby electronic devices than the high frequency magnetic fields produced by inductive coupling systems. A prototype system charging electric vehicles has been in operation at University of British Columbia since 2012. Other researchers, however, claim that the two energy conversions (electrical to mechanical to electrical again) make the system less efficient than electrical systems like inductive coupling.

=== Zenneck wave transmission ===
A new kind of system using the Zenneck type waves was shown by Oruganti et al., where they demonstrated that it was possible to excite Zenneck wave type waves on flat metal-air interfaces and transmit power across metal obstacles. Here the idea is to excite a localized charge oscillation at the metal-air interface, the resulting modes propagate along the metal-air interface.

== Far-field (radiative) techniques ==
Far field methods achieve longer ranges, often multiple kilometer ranges, where the distance is much greater than the diameter of the device(s). High-directivity antennas or well-collimated laser light produce a beam of energy that can be made to match the shape of the receiving area. The maximum directivity for antennas is physically limited by diffraction.

In general, visible light (from lasers) and microwaves (from purpose-designed antennas) are the forms of electromagnetic radiation best suited to energy transfer.

The dimensions of the components may be dictated by the distance from transmitter to receiver, the wavelength and the Rayleigh criterion or diffraction limit, used in standard radio frequency antenna design, which also applies to lasers. Airy's diffraction limit is also frequently used to determine an approximate spot size at an arbitrary distance from the aperture. Electromagnetic radiation experiences less diffraction at shorter wavelengths (higher frequencies); so, for example, a blue laser is diffracted less than a red one.

The Rayleigh limit (also known as the Abbe diffraction limit), although originally applied to image resolution, can be viewed in reverse, and dictates that the irradiance (or intensity) of any electromagnetic wave (such as a microwave or laser beam) will be reduced as the beam diverges over distance at a minimum rate inversely proportional to the aperture size. The larger the ratio of a transmitting antenna's aperture or laser's exit aperture to the wavelength of radiation, the more the radiation can be concentrated in a compact beam.

Microwave power beaming can be more efficient than lasers, and is less prone to atmospheric attenuation caused by dust or aerosols such as fog.

Here, the power levels are calculated by combining the parameters together, and adding in the gains and losses due to the antenna characteristics and the transparency and dispersion of the medium through which the radiation passes. That process is known as calculating a link budget.

=== Microwaves ===
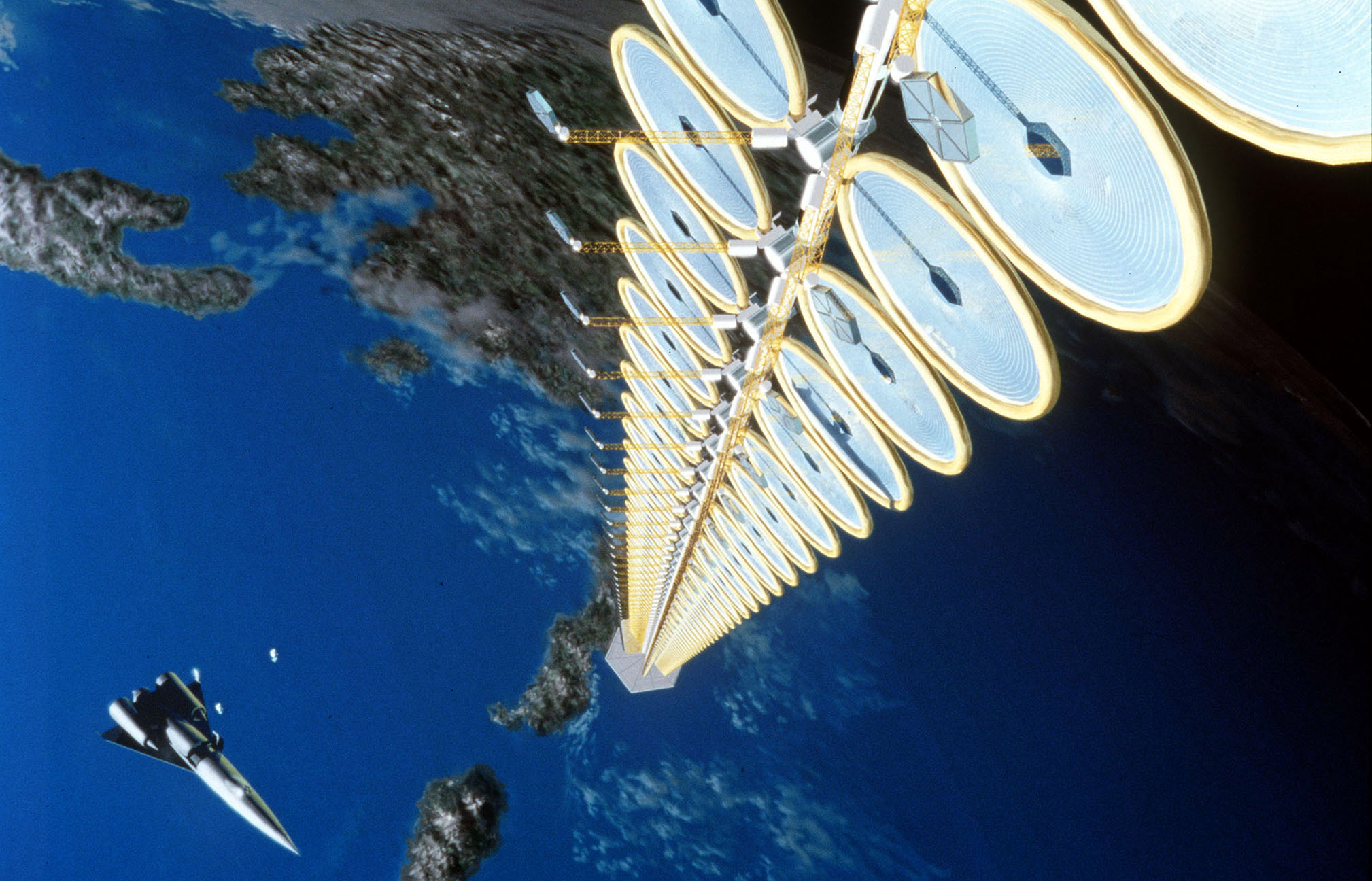
An artist's depiction of a solar satellite that could send energy by microwaves to a space vessel or planetary surface

Power transmission via radio waves can be made more directional, allowing longer-distance power beaming, with shorter wavelengths of electromagnetic radiation, typically in the microwave range. A rectenna may be used to convert the microwave energy back into electricity. Rectenna conversion efficiencies exceeding 95% have been realized. Power beaming using microwaves has been proposed for the transmission of energy from orbiting solar power satellites to Earth and the beaming of power to spacecraft leaving orbit has been considered.

Power beaming by microwaves has the difficulty that, for most space applications, the required aperture sizes are very large due to diffraction limiting antenna directionality. For example, the 1978 NASA study of solar power satellites required a 1-kilometre-diameter (0.62 mi) transmitting antenna and a 10-kilometre-diameter (6.2 mi) receiving rectenna for a microwave beam at 2.45 GHz. These sizes can be somewhat decreased by using shorter wavelengths, although short wavelengths may have difficulties with atmospheric absorption and beam blockage by rain or water droplets. Because of the "thinned-array curse", it is not possible to make a narrower beam by combining the beams of several smaller satellites.

For earthbound applications, a large-area 10 km diameter receiving array allows large total power levels to be used while operating at the low power density suggested for human electromagnetic exposure safety. A human safe power density of 1 mW/cm^{2} distributed across a 10 km diameter area corresponds to 750 megawatts total power level. This is the power level found in many modern electric power plants. For comparison, a solar PV farm of similar size might easily exceed 10,000 megawatts at best conditions during daytime.

Following World War II, which saw the development of high-power microwave emitters known as cavity magnetrons, the idea of using microwaves to transfer power was researched. By 1964, a miniature helicopter propelled by microwave power had been demonstrated.

Japanese researcher Hidetsugu Yagi also investigated wireless energy transmission using a directional array antenna that he designed. In February 1926, Yagi and his colleague Shintaro Uda published their first paper on the tuned high-gain directional array now known as the Yagi antenna. While it did not prove to be particularly useful for power transmission, this beam antenna has been widely adopted throughout the broadcasting and wireless telecommunications industries due to its excellent performance characteristics.

Wireless high power transmission using microwaves is well proven. Experiments in the tens of kilowatts have been performed at the Goldstone Deep Space Communications Complex in California in 1975 and more recently (1997) at Grand Bassin on Reunion Island. These methods achieve distances on the order of a kilometer.

Under experimental conditions, microwave conversion efficiency was measured to be around 54% across one meter.

A change to 24 GHz has been suggested as microwave emitters similar to LEDs have been made with very high quantum efficiencies using negative resistance, i.e., Gunn or IMPATT diodes, and this would be viable for short range links.

In 2013, inventor Hatem Zeine demonstrated how wireless power transmission using phased array antennas can deliver electrical power up to 30 feet. It uses the same radio frequencies as WiFi.

In 2015, researchers at the University of Washington introduced power over Wi-Fi, which trickle-charges batteries and powered battery-free cameras and temperature sensors using transmissions from Wi-Fi routers. Wi-Fi signals were shown to power battery-free temperature and camera sensors at ranges of up to 20 feet. It was also shown that Wi-Fi can be used to wirelessly trickle-charge nickel–metal hydride and lithium-ion coin-cell batteries at distances of up to 28 feet.

In 2017, the Federal Communications Commission (FCC) certified the first mid-field radio frequency (RF) transmitter of wireless power. In 2021 the FCC granted a license to an over-the-air (OTA) wireless charging system that combines near-field and far-field methods by using a frequency of about 900 MHz. Due to the radiated power of about 1 W this system is intended for small IoT devices as various sensors, trackers, detectors and monitors.

=== Lasers ===
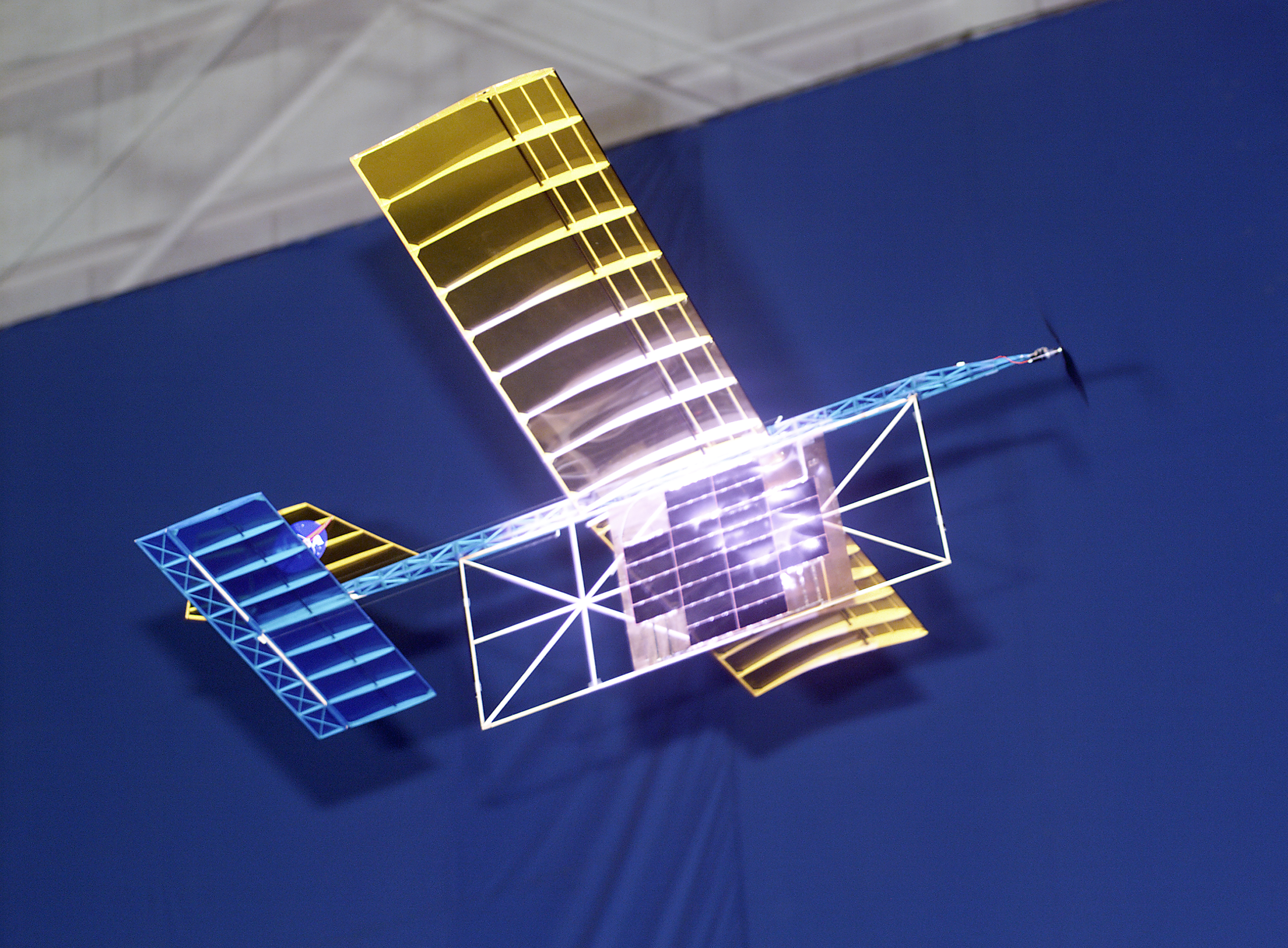
A laser beam centered on a panel of photovoltaic cells provides enough power to a lightweight model airplane for it to fly.

Power can be transmitted by converting electricity into a laser beam that is received and concentrated onto photovoltaic cells (solar cells). It exploits electromagnetic radiation closer to the visible region (.2 to 2 micrometers). This mechanism is generally known as 'power beaming' because the power is beamed at a receiver that can convert it to electrical energy. At the receiver, power converters optimized for monochromatic light conversion are applied.

Advantages compared to other wireless methods are:

- Distance: Collimated monochromatic wavefront propagation allows narrow beam cross-section area for transmission over large distances. As a result, there is little or no reduction in power at greater distance from the transmitter to the receiver.
- Size: solid state lasers fit into small form factors.
- Interference: Avoids radio-frequency interference to existing radio communication such as Wi-Fi and cell phones.
- Access: only receivers hit by the laser receive power.

Drawbacks include:

- Hazards: Without a safety mechanism, even low power levels can blind humans and other animals. High power levels can kill through spot heating.
- Efficiency: Optical to electrical conversion efficiency of photovoltaic cells is limited. However, power converters have demonstrated efficiencies up to 68.9%
- Weather: Atmospheric absorption, and absorption and scattering by clouds, fog, rain, etc., causes up to 100% losses.
- Access: Requires line of sight connection to the target or transmission via an optical fiber.

Power beaming technology was explored in military applications and aerospace applications. Also, it powers sensors in industrial environments and for commercial and consumer electronics. Wireless energy transfer systems using lasers for consumer space have to satisfy laser safety requirements standardized under IEC 60825.

The first wireless power system using lasers for consumer applications was Wi-Charge, demonstrated in 2018, capable of delivering power to stationary and moving devices across a room. This wireless power system complied with safety regulations. It is approved by the US Food and Drug Administration (FDA).

Other issues include propagation, and the coherence and the range limitation problem.

NASA's Dryden Flight Research Center demonstrated a unmanned model plane powered by a laser beam, demonstrating the feasibility of periodic laser recharging.

Scientists from the Chinese Academy of Sciences developed a proof-of-concept of utilizing a dual-wavelength laser to wirelessly charge portable devices or UAVs.

In 2025 DARPA announced transmission of 800 watts for 30 seconds at a distance of 5.3 miles (8.6 km) at 20% efficiency, exceeding prior results of beaming 230 watts across one mile (1.7 km) for 25 seconds using its Power Receiver Array Demo (PRAD).

=== Atmospheric plasma channel coupling ===
In atmospheric plasma channel coupling, energy is transferred between two electrodes by electrical conduction through ionized air. When an electric field gradient exists between the two electrodes, exceeding 34 kilovolts per centimeter at sea level atmospheric pressure, an electric arc occurs. This atmospheric dielectric breakdown results in the flow of electric current along a random trajectory through an ionized plasma channel between the two electrodes. An example of this is natural lightning, where one electrode is a virtual point in a cloud and the other is a point on Earth. Laser Induced Plasma Channel (LIPC) research is presently underway using ultrafast lasers to artificially promote development of the plasma channel through the air, directing the electric arc, and guiding the current across a specific path in a controllable manner. The laser energy reduces the atmospheric dielectric breakdown voltage and the air is made less insulating by superheating, which lowers the density ($p$) of the filament of air.

This new process is being explored for use as a laser lightning rod and as a means to trigger lightning bolts from clouds for natural lightning channel studies, for artificial atmospheric propagation studies, as a substitute for conventional radio antennas, for applications associated with electric welding and machining, for diverting power from high-voltage capacitor discharges, for directed-energy weapon applications employing electrical conduction through a ground return path, and electronic jamming.

== Energy harvesting ==
In the context of wireless power, energy harvesting, also called power harvesting or energy scavenging, is the conversion of ambient energy from the environment to electric power, mainly to power small autonomous wireless electronic devices. The ambient energy may come from stray electric or magnetic fields or radio waves from nearby electrical equipment, light, thermal energy (heat), or kinetic energy such as vibration or motion of the device. Although the efficiency of conversion is usually low and the power gathered often minuscule (milliwatts or microwatts), it can be adequate to run or recharge small micropower wireless devices such as remote sensors, which are proliferating in many fields. This new technology is being developed to eliminate the need for battery replacement or charging of such wireless devices, allowing them to operate completely autonomously.

== Uses ==
Inductive power transfer between nearby wire coils was the earliest wireless power technology to be developed, existing since the transformer was developed in the 1800s. Induction heating has been used since the early 1900s and is used for induction cooking.

With the advent of cordless devices, induction charging stands have been developed for appliances used in wet environments, like electric toothbrushes and electric razors, to eliminate the hazard of electric shock. One of the earliest proposed applications of inductive transfer was to power electric locomotives. In 1892 Maurice Hutin and Maurice Leblanc patented a wireless method of powering railroad trains using resonant coils inductively coupled to a track wire at 3 kHz.

In the early 1960s resonant inductive wireless energy transfer was used successfully in implantable medical devices including such devices as pacemakers and artificial hearts. While the early systems used a resonant receiver coil, later systems implemented resonant transmitter coils as well. These medical devices are designed for high efficiency using low power electronics while efficiently accommodating some misalignment and dynamic twisting of the coils. The separation between the coils in implantable applications is commonly less than 20 cm. Today resonant inductive energy transfer is regularly used for providing electric power in many commercially available medical implantable devices.

The first passive RFID (Radio Frequency Identification) technologies were invented by Mario Cardullo (1973) and Koelle et al. (1975) and by the 1990s were being used in proximity cards and contactless smartcards.

The proliferation of portable wireless communication devices such as mobile phones, tablet, and laptop computers in recent decades is currently driving the development of mid-range wireless powering and charging technology to eliminate the need for these devices to be tethered to wall plugs during charging. The Wireless Power Consortium was established in 2008 to develop interoperable standards across manufacturers. Its Qi inductive power standard published in August 2009 enables high efficiency charging and powering of portable devices of up to 5 watts over distances of 4 cm (1.6 inches). The wireless device is placed on a flat charger plate (which can be embedded in table tops at cafes, for example) and power is transferred from a flat coil in the charger to a similar one in the device. In 2007, a team led by Marin Soljačić at MIT used a dual resonance transmitter with a 25 cm diameter secondary tuned to 10 MHz to transfer 60 W of power to a similar dual resonance receiver over a distance of 2 meters (6.6 ft) (eight times the transmitter coil diameter) at around 40% efficiency.

In 2008 the team of Greg Leyh and Mike Kennan of Nevada Lightning Lab used a grounded dual resonance transmitter with a 57 cm diameter secondary tuned to 60 kHz and a similar grounded dual resonance receiver to transfer power through coupled electric fields with an earth current return circuit over a distance of 12 meters (39 ft). In 2011, Dr. Christopher A. Tucker and Professor Kevin Warwick of the University of Reading, recreated Tesla's 1900 patent 0,645,576 in miniature and demonstrated power transmission over 4 meters (13 ft) with a coil diameter of 10 centimetres (3.9 in) at a resonant frequency of 27.50 MHz, with an effective efficiency of 60%.

A major motivation for microwave research in the 1970s and 1980s was to develop a satellite for space-based solar power. Conceived in 1968 by Peter Glaser, this would harvest energy from sunlight using solar cells and beam it down to Earth as microwaves to huge rectennas, which would convert it to electrical energy on the electric power grid. In landmark 1975 experiments as technical director of a JPL/Raytheon program, Brown demonstrated long-range transmission by beaming 475 W of microwave power to a rectenna a mile away, with a microwave to DC conversion efficiency of 54%. At NASA's Jet Propulsion Laboratory, he and Robert Dickinson transmitted 30 kW DC output power across 1.5 km with 2.38 GHz microwaves from a 26 m dish to a 7.3 x 3.5 m rectenna array. The incident-RF to DC conversion efficiency of the rectenna was 80%. In 1983 Japan launched Microwave Ionosphere Nonlinear Interaction Experiment (MINIX), a rocket experiment to test transmission of high power microwaves through the ionosphere.

In recent years a focus of research has been the development of wireless-powered drone aircraft, which began in 1959 with the Dept. of Defense's RAMP (Raytheon Airborne Microwave Platform) project which sponsored Brown's research. In 1987 Canada's Communications Research Center developed a small prototype airplane called Stationary High Altitude Relay Platform (SHARP) to relay telecommunication data between points on earth similar to a communications satellite. Powered by a rectenna, it could fly at 13 miles (21 km) altitude and stay aloft for months. In 1992 a team at Kyoto University built a more advanced craft called MILAX (MIcrowave Lifted Airplane eXperiment).

In 2003 NASA flew the first laser powered aircraft. The small model plane's motor was powered by electricity generated by photocells from a beam of infrared light from a ground-based laser, while a control system kept the laser pointed at the plane.

== See also ==
- Beam Power Challenge – Space elevator prize contest
- Electromagnetic compatibility – Electrical engineering concept
- Electromagnetic radiation and health – Aspect of public health
- Friis transmission equation – Formula in telecommunications engineering of antenna performance
- Thinned array curse – Theorem in electromagnetic theory of antennas
- The Quiet Earth, sci-fi film about wireless power transfer.
