= Microwave Ionosphere Nonlinear Interaction Experiment =

The Microwave Ionosphere Nonlinear Interaction Experiment (MINIX) is a sounding rocket experiment launched by Japan on 29 August 1983. Its purpose was to study the effects of Microwave energy in the Ionosphere, and to study high-power microwave technology for use in a Space-based solar power satellite.
