= Rectenna =

Antenna for receiving power

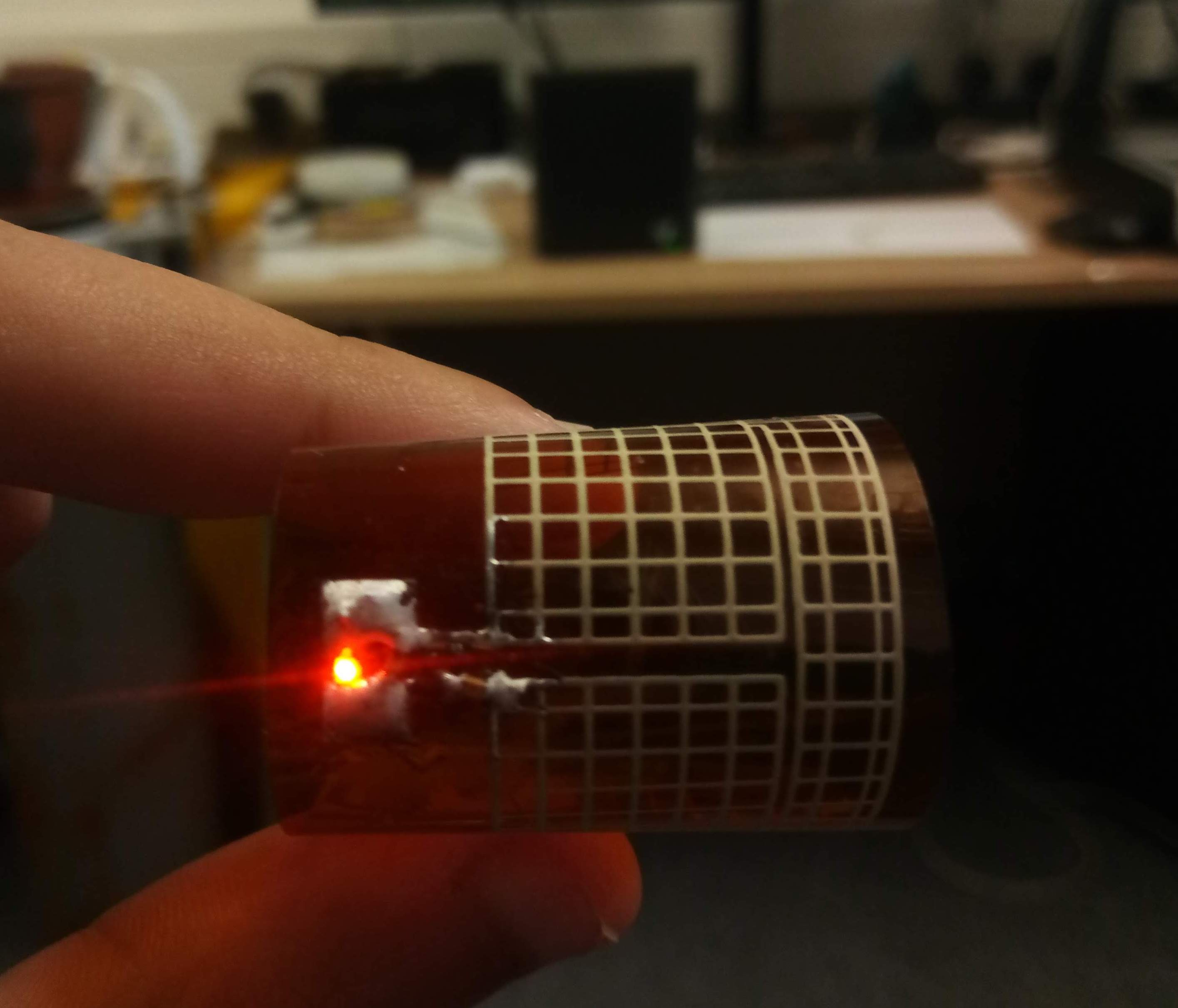
A printed meshed rectenna lighting an LED from a Powercast 915 MHz transmitter

A rectenna (rectifying antenna) is a special type of receiving antenna that is used for converting electromagnetic energy into direct current (DC) electricity. They are used in wireless power transmission systems that transmit power by radio waves. A simple rectenna element consists of a dipole antenna with a diode connected across the dipole elements. The diode rectifies the AC induced in the antenna by the microwaves, to produce DC power, which powers a load connected across the diode. Schottky diodes are usually used because they have the lowest voltage drop and highest speed and therefore have the lowest power losses due to conduction and switching. Large rectennas consist of arrays of many power receiving elements such as dipole antennas.

== Power beaming applications ==
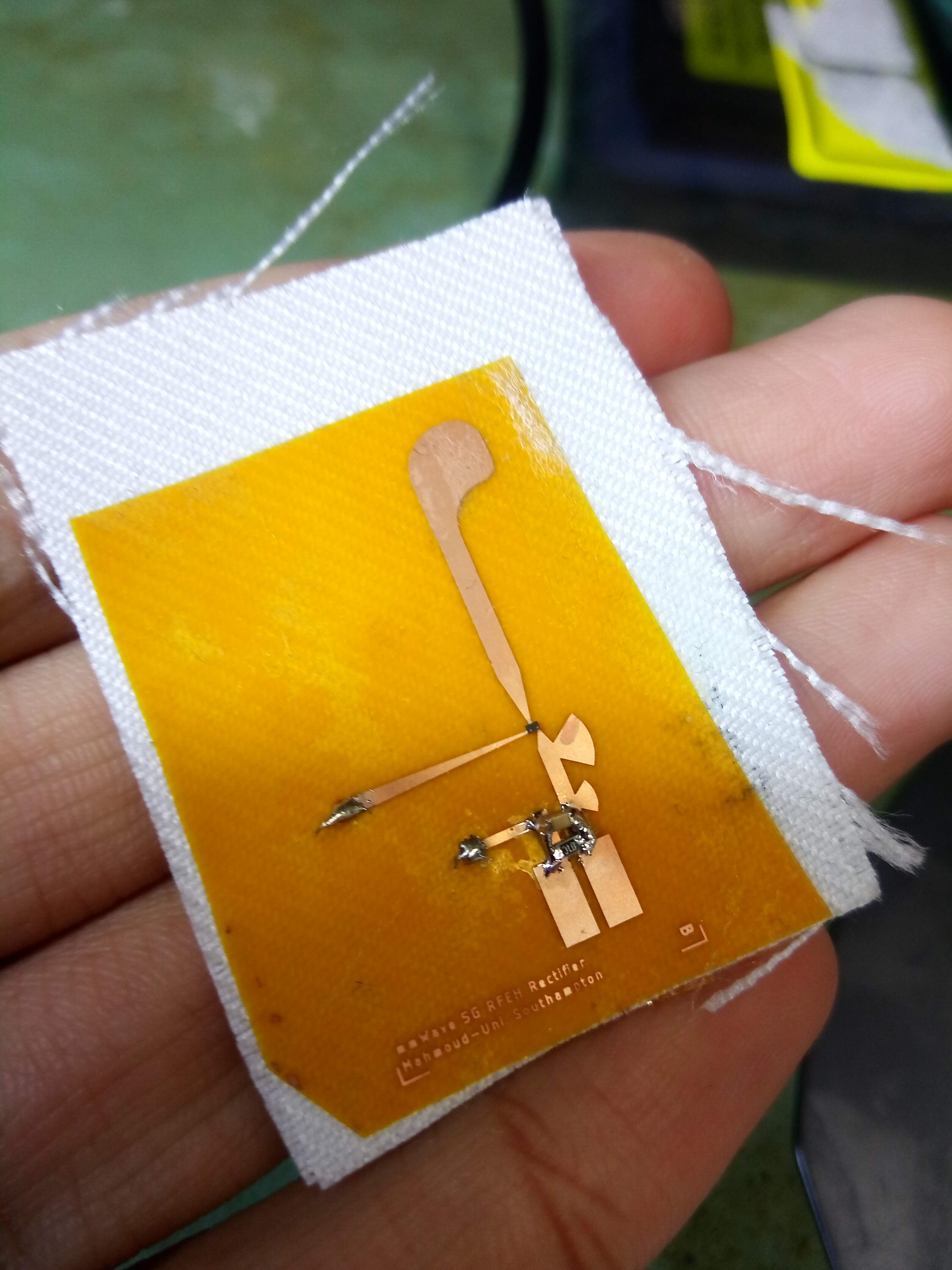
A wearable millimeter-wave textile rectenna fabricated on a textile substrate for harvesting power in the 5G K-bands (20–26.5 GHz)

The invention of the rectenna in the 1960s made long distance wireless power transmission feasible. The rectenna was invented in 1964 and patented in 1969 by US electrical engineer William C. Brown, who demonstrated it with a model helicopter powered by microwaves transmitted from the ground, received by an attached rectenna. Since the 1970s, one of the major motivations for rectenna research has been to develop a receiving antenna for proposed solar power satellites, which would harvest energy from sunlight in space with solar cells and beam it down to Earth as microwaves to huge rectenna arrays. A proposed military application is to power drone reconnaissance aircraft with microwaves beamed from the ground, allowing them to stay aloft for long periods.

In recent years, interest has turned to using rectennas as power sources for small wireless microelectronic devices. The largest current use of rectennas is in RFID tags, proximity cards and contactless smart cards, which contain an integrated circuit (IC) which is powered by a small rectenna element. When the device is brought near an electronic reader unit, radio waves from the reader are received by the rectenna, powering up the IC, which transmits its data back to the reader.

== Radio frequency rectennas ==
The simplest crystal radio receiver, employing an antenna and a demodulating diode (rectifier), is actually a rectenna, although it discards the DC component before sending the signal to the headphones. People living near strong radio transmitters would occasionally discover that with a long receiving antenna, they could get enough electric power to light a light bulb.

However, this example uses only one antenna having a limited capture area. A rectenna array uses multiple antennas spread over a wide area to capture more energy.

Researchers are experimenting with the use of rectennas to power sensors in remote areas and distributed networks of sensors, especially for IoT applications.

RF rectennas are used for several forms of wireless power transfer. In the microwave range, experimental devices have reached a power conversion efficiency of 85–90%. The record conversion efficiency for a rectenna is 90.6% for 2.45 GHz, with lower efficiency of about 82% achieved at 5.82 GHz.

== Optical rectennas ==
In principle, similar devices, scaled down to the proportions used in nanotechnology, can be used to convert light directly into electricity. This type of device is called an optical rectenna (or "nantenna"). Theoretically, high efficiencies can be maintained as the device shrinks, but to date efficiency has been limited, and so far there has not been convincing evidence that rectification has been achieved at optical frequencies. The University of Missouri previously reported on work to develop low-cost, high-efficiency optical-frequency rectennas. Other prototype devices were investigated in a collaboration between the University of Connecticut and Penn State Altoona using a grant from the National Science Foundation. With the use of atomic layer deposition it has been suggested that conversion efficiencies of solar energy to electricity higher than 70% could eventually be achieved.

The creation of successful optical rectenna technology has two major complicating factors:

1. Fabricating an antenna small enough to couple optical wavelengths.
2. Creating an ultra-fast diode capable of rectifying the high frequency oscillations, at frequency of c. 500 THz.

Below are a few examples of potential paths to creating diodes that would be fast enough to rectify optical and near-optical radiation.

A promising path towards creating these ultrafast diodes has been in the form of "geometric diodes". Graphene geometric diodes have been reported to rectify terahertz radiation. In April 2020, geometric diodes were reported in silicon nanowires. The wires were shown experimentally to rectify up to 40 GHz, that result was the limit of the instrument used, and the wires theoretically may be able to rectify signals in the terahertz region as well.

== See also ==
- Microstrip antenna
- Wireless power transfer
