= Cordless =

Battery-powered device with no power cord

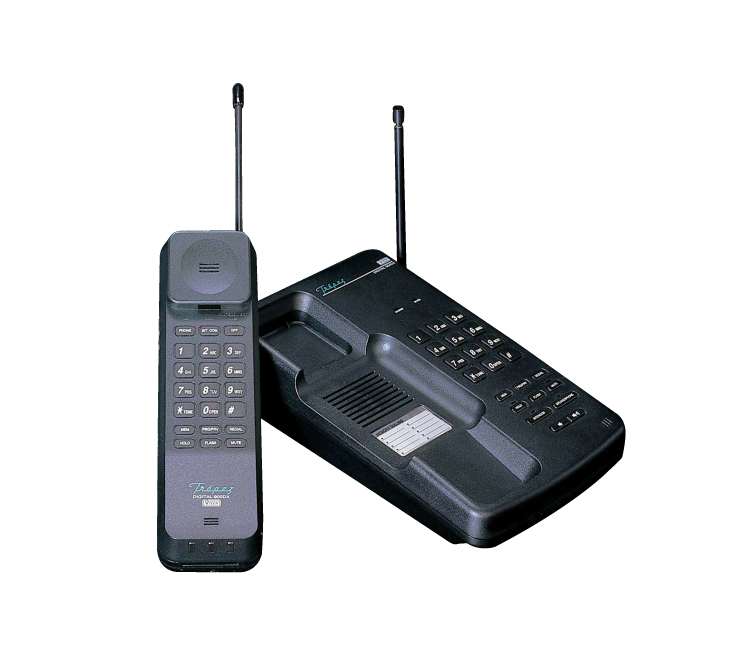
Cordless phone

The term cordless is generally used to refer to electrical or electronic devices that are powered by a battery or battery pack and can operate without a power cord or cable attached to an electrical outlet to provide mains power, allowing greater mobility. The term "cordless" should not be confused with the term "Wireless", although it often is in common usage, possibly because some cordless devices (e.g., cordless telephones) are also wireless. The term "wireless" generally refers to devices that use some form of energy (e.g., radio waves, infrared, ultrasonic, etc.) to transfer information or commands over a distance without the use of communication wires, regardless of whether the device gets its power from a power cord or a battery. The term "portable" is an even more general term and, when referring to electrical and electronic devices, usually means devices which are totally self-contained (e.g., have built-in power supplies, have no base unit, etc.) and which may also use wireless technology.

== See also ==
- Digital Enhanced Cordless Telecommunications (DECT)
- Inductive charging
- Wireless
- Wireless power transfer
