= Wallace & Gromit's World of Invention =

- Genre: Science; Comedy
- Created by: Nick Park
- Based on: Wallace & Gromit by Nick Park
- Written by: Alex Pascall; Richard Hansome
- Directed by: Merlin Crossingham
- Creative director: Nick Park
- Voices of: Peter Sallis; Ashley Jensen; John Sparkes
- Theme music composer: Julian Nott
- Composers: Rob David; Dan Delor
- Country of origin: United Kingdom
- Original language: English
- No. of episodes: 6

Production
- Executive producers: Peter Lord; Nick Park; David Sproxton; Jacqueline Hewer; Alison Kirkham
- Producer: Bob Baker
- Cinematography: David Alex Riddett
- Running time: 30 Minutes
- Production company: Aardman Animations

Original release
- Network: BBC One
- Release: 3 November – 8 December 2010

Related
- Wallace & Gromit: A Matter of Loaf and Death

Wallace & Gromit's World of Invention is a British science-themed miniseries, starring Peter Sallis, Ashley Jensen, Jem Stansfield, and John Sparkes, produced by Aardman Animations, which aired on BBC One during 2010, from 3 November to 8 December and Channel 10 during 2011, from 20 September to 6 October. The programme focuses on inventions based around various themes, and consists of live-action films interlaced with animated claymation segments hosted by characters Wallace & Gromit, featuring a side-plot connected to that episode's theme. While Sallis reprises his role as the voice of Wallace, live-action film segments were either narrated by Jensen or presented by Stansfield, with Sparkes providing the voice of unseen archivist Goronwy, a unique character for the programme.

The programme ran for six episodes and was the last production that Sallis performed in before his retirement from acting due to ill health. Its creation was aimed by the BBC at inspiring a new generation of inventors, according to a press statement released prior to the programme's broadcast.

== Premise ==
Each episode is focused on a specific theme that underlines the various inventions explored by the programme, as well as the side-plot of the animated escapades of Wallace and Gromit - while the former acts as host, the latter mainly tries to focus on running the film equipment the pair uses in the basement of their home. The side-plots often focus on an invention that Wallace has created to improve the pair's lives, inspired by the topical theme of the episode. Often the invention backfires due to bad construction or a mishap. Most of the programme consists of live-action segments. Most of these are narrated by Ashley Jensen, and focus on a novel invention and/or a modern inventor, with the exception of a recurring segment entitled "It Never Got Off the Drawing Board", which is presented by Jem Stansfield (referred to as Wallace's "science correspondent") and focuses on an invention that never got past the design or prototype stage. In a segment entitled "Contraption Countdown" and narrated by Wallace's archivist Goronwy (voiced by John Sparkes), the show features a countdown of five or six inventions documented in archive footage, connected to the episode's theme.

== Episodes ==
No.	Title	Directed by	Original release date
1	"Nature Knows Best"	Merlin Crossingham	3 November 2010
Wallace welcomes us to his World of Invention. Segments explore the wonders of the natural world, and look at inventions inspired by Mother Nature. At the German company Festo, engineers are developing flying penguins and other manta ray-inspired, radio-controlled airships. Design student James Auger has, inspired by the Venus flytrap, created a clock that runs on flies. In the Netherlands, kinetic sculptor Theo Jansen demonstrates his latest contraption, the Animaris Siamesis, a 'beach beast' constructed from PVC tubes. In Namibia, scientists are studying the intricate structures of termite mounds to create self-cooling houses of the future. Wallace's archive librarian Goronwy counts down five inventions inspired by the animal kingdom. Israeli inventor Alan Bodner is building a machine that extracts breathable air from water. In the side-plot, Wallace introduces his latest invention, the Jumbo-Generator - which incorporates an elephant named Kevin - that serves to power the studio. At the end of the episode, Kevin ends up going after Wallace's iced buns, breaking the generator down. Segments; 1. Marine biology into technology 2. Insect-powered machines 3. Inventor of the Week: Theo Jansen; 4. Curiosity Corner: Termites; 5. Contraption Countdown: Top 5 animal-inspired contraptions 6. It Never Got Off The Drawing Board: Artificial gills
2	"Reach for the Sky"	Merlin Crossingham	10 November 2010
Segments explore man's fascination with flight. Steve Bennett from Manchester has spent decades building bigger and bigger rockets, powering them with fuel made from car tires. On location in the USA, the team explores the Bio-Suit, an advanced flexible spacesuit conceived by MIT aerospace engineer Dava Newman, which is intended to make exploration of the planet Mars easier. Californian inventor Fred Ferguson builds kites and wind-powered electricity turbines that exploit the Magnus effect. There is a look at some planes that unfortunately do not fly in another Contraption Countdown. In Buttenhausen, Germany, a look at the troubled life of Gustav Mesmer, designer of human-powered flying machines. The history and workings of jet packs with the only man in Britain who owns one. During the side-plot, Wallace accidentally locks Gromit in the rocket from A Grand Day Out and makes it shoot off with his dog inside. Gromit telephones him, but to no avail, and escapes the rocket just in time when Wallace accidentally presses the self destruct button. Wallace is shocked to find his rocket is missing ("Hey! What have you done with me rocket?"). Segments; 1. Steve Bennett's home-made rockets 2. Bio-Suit; 3. It Never Got Off The Drawing Board: Magnus Effect wind turbines 4. Contraption Countdown: Top 6 flying failures 5. Curiosity Corner: Gustav Mesmer; 6. Jet-pack flying
3	"Home Sweet Home"	Merlin Crossingham	17 November 2010
Wallace, Gromit and their team look at ingenious inventions for the home, from 1940s household robots and humanoid butlers to once cutting-edge labour saving devices, to explore the social history of domestic life through inventions. 'George', one of the first walking humanoid robots ever built, is brought to life for the first time in 60 years by his creator, Tony Sale. In Malawi, young inventor William Kamkwamba has, through self-learning, brought electricity to his village. In the 1930s, Britain, waking up to a cup of warm tea was made possible though the introduction of an automatic tea maker called the 'teasmade'. Albert Einstein's 1930 design for a fridge never got off the drawing board. A fridge design by Emily Cummins can benefit parts of the world where electricity is not available, as it is made from scrap materials and does not require power. Trevor Baylis invented the wind-up radio to help make communications in Africa easier. Goronwy counts down five gadgets for use in the home, one of which is a Beer Launching Fridge. In the side-plot, Wallace introduces his LAD (Labour Assisting Device) robot (which bears some resemblance to the cooker from A Grand Day Out), replacing Gromit, who becomes jealous of it. At the end, when Wallace (inspired by footage of the Beer Launching Fridge) reprograms the LAD to throw tea to him, Gromit pours some inside the robot when Wallace is not looking. The LAD goes out of control and starts to throw things at Wallace, while Gromit refuses to help. No "Curiosity Corner" segment here, though Gromit can be seen relaxing in it at the end of the episode. Segments; 1. Housekeeping robots and George; 2. William Kamkwamba's windmill 3. History of the Teasmade; 4. It Never Got Off The Drawing Board: Einstein fridge 5. Inventor of the Week: Trevor Baylis; 6. Contraption Countdown: Top 5 most useful household gadgets
4	"Come to Your Senses"	Merlin Crossingham	24 November 2010
Wallace and Gromit experience the world through the five senses, exploring the facts behind invisibility cloaks, bomb-detecting bees and other sensory inventions. At Imperial College London, scientists led by physicist Sir John Pendry are creating prototype invisibility cloaks using metamaterials to bend light around objects. Goronwy lists five inventions based on the senses. In Murray, Kentucky we hear the story of Nathan Stubblefield, a local farmer who demonstrated wireless telephony over a hundred years ago. In Tasmania, we meet our Inventor of the Week, engineer Mark Lesek, who made his own prosthetic arm based on an early 20th century design called the Carnes Arm. English scientist Adam Hart explains how bees can be trained to detect explosives. Finally, the BrainPort Vision Device allows the blind to 'see' with their tongue using hi-tech sunglasses. During the segment introductions, Wallace demonstrates two forms of communication; an attempt to use Indian smoke signals causes a fire in the studio while a subsequent attempt at using speaking tubes (like the early submariners did) results in him being doused with tea. At the end of the episode, he samples a special type of cheese. Segments; 1. Sight - Invisibility cloak 2. Contraption Countdown: Top 5 sense-inspired inventions 3. Sound - It Never Got Off the Drawing Board: Stubblefield mobile telephone system 4. Touch - Inventor of the Week: Mark Lesek; 5. Smell - Curiosity Corner: Bee bomb detection 6. Taste - The BrainPort Vision Device.
5	"Better Safe Than Sorry"	Merlin Crossingham	1 December 2010
Wallace and Gromit have always taken their safety into their own hands, and in this episode they consider other inventors with the same philosophy. A segment on the workings and history of the ejector seat includes an interview with a pilot who had to eject himself twice. A U.S. Royal Air Force research project that intends to disguise spy drones as birds hearkens back to stories of photo cameras tied to German homing pigeons during World War I. 1940s Hollywood star Hedy Lamarr and musical composer George Antheil devised a radio-controlled 'Secret Communications System' for steering torpedoes, inspired by the pianola, to help allied forces in the Second World War. The many patent filings by British inventor Arthur Pedrick, such as one for a 'photon push-pull radiation detector for use in chromatically selective cat flap control and 1,000 megaton, earth-orbital, peace-keeping bomb', made life at the Patent Office more enjoyable. The Extravehicular Mobility Unit protects astronauts from the extreme temperatures in space. Goronwy counts down six inventions that are bad for your health. Throughout the side-plot, Gromit keeps suffering from accidents instigated by Wallace as misguided safety demonstrations. Wallace ends up in an accident himself at the end of the episode involving a specially-made inflating safety suit. Segments; 1. History of ejector seats 2. Pigeon spy cameras 3. It Never Got Off The Drawing Board: Hedy Lamarr's frequency-hopping torpedo system 4. Curiosity Corner: Arthur Pedrick; 5. EMU Spacesuit; 6. Contraption Countdown: Top 6 health-and-safety nightmares
6	"From A to B"	Merlin Crossingham	8 December 2010
In the last episode, Wallace and Gromit explore unusual transportation inventions from around the globe. Russian Mikhail Puchkov spent three decades perfecting his one man pedal-powered submarine, despite getting arrested by the KGB. Cedric Lynch from Potters Bar, England, the inventor of the Lynch motor for electric vehicles, has entered the TT Zero electric motorcycle race on the Isle of Man. In the 'Contraption Countdown' the focus is on peculiar transport devices. In the early seventies, engineer Charles Osmond Frederick attempted to solve Britain's railway problems by designing an interplanetary 'space vehicle'. A modern day variant of this laser powered flying saucer is the Lightcraft, developed by professor Leik Myrabo and funded by the Brazilian Air Force. Sir Clive Sinclair not only helped popularize the pocket calculator, he also designed a digital watch, a range of personal computers and the Sinclair C5, an electrically assisted pedal cycle that wouldn't sell. In 1845-1846, Isambard Kingdom Brunel built an atmospheric railway that used air pressure to push train carriages along. In the side-plot, Wallace has invented a 'runabout steam chair' to get around, but before the final segment, the pressure in it becomes too much and it falls apart. Wallace, though, doesn't let it go to waste and repurposes it as a dual water boiler and oven. Segments; 1. Mikhail Puchkov's mini-sub 2. Electric motors and Cedric Lynch; 3. Contraption Countdown: Top 6 most peculiar forms of transport 4. Curiosity Corner: Flying saucer and Lightcrafts; 5. Inventor of the Week: Sir Clive Sinclair; 6. It Never Got Off The Drawing Board: Brunel's atmospheric railway

== Production ==
The series was commissioned by Jay Hunt, controller of BBC One, and Jo Ball, following a meeting to discuss the concept of the programme, with Alison Kirkham from the BBC and Miles Bullough from Aardman as the executive producers. The show's concept was to take a look at real-life inventors, contraptions, gadgets and inventions, from an educational point of view, but interlaced with the light-hearted humour associated with Wallace & Gromit.

== Home release ==
On 13 December 2010, a DVD of the entire series was released, which also included a pamphlet of ideas for inventions and six short video demonstrations. A Blu-ray release followed on 13 March 2012 in America by Lionsgate Home Entertainment.
