= Leik Myrabo =

American aerospace engineer

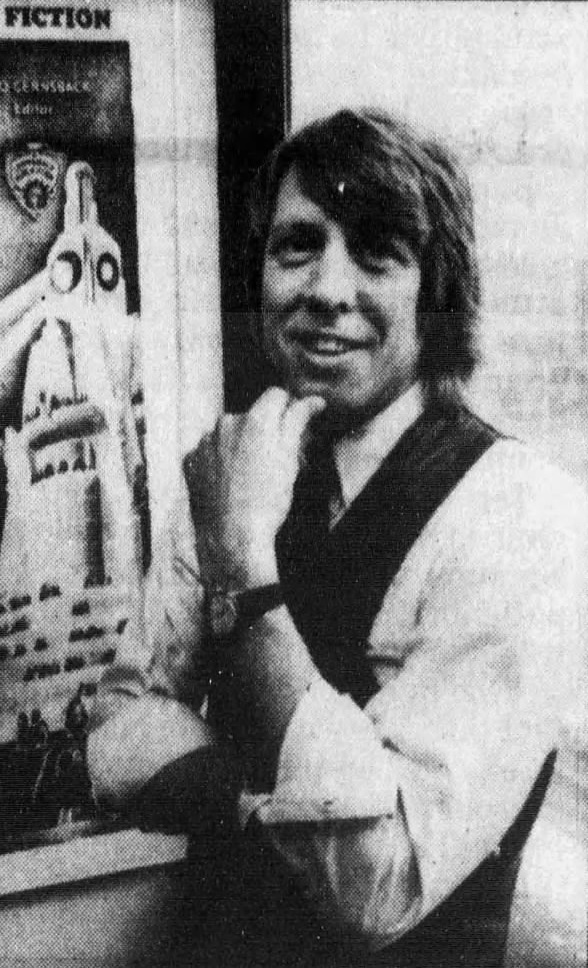
- Myrabo in 1984
- Born: 1944 (age 81–82)
- Education: Iowa State University (BS in aerospace engineering, 1968), University of California, San Diego (PhD in engineering physics, 1976)
- Known for: Lightcraft; Beamed-energy propulsion; Laser propulsion
- Spouse: Christie
- Scientific career
- Fields: Mechanical engineering, aerospace engineering, nuclear engineering
- Workplaces: Rensselaer Polytechnic Institute, Air Force Research Laboratory, Braddock Dunn & McDonald, Lightcraft Technologies, Inc.
- Thesis: Statistical models for the prediction of oxidant air quality (1976)

Leik Norwald Myrabo is an American aerospace engineer known for research on beamed-energy propulsion and for proposing and developing the lightcraft, a laser-propelled flight vehicle concept. (Note: Laser propulsion research predates Myrabo. A review in New Space traces laser propulsion to 1970s work by Kantrowitz and by Bunkin and Prokhorov, and describes later experiments launching the LightCraft designed by Myrabo and John Lewis as drawing attention. Laser Focus World describes the Lightcraft vehicle as proposed and developed by Myrabo. CNN reported that Lightcraft were "limited to paper studies" until roughly the mid-1990s, when Myrabo and Air Force scientist Franklin Mead began testing it. The South African Journal of Science describes Myrabo's lightcraft programme as "extending laser propulsion outside the laboratory". A 2025 review in Aerospace states that Myrabo proposed light-powered flight in 1983 and that Lightcraft Technologies Incorporated validated the concept by October 2000.) He was an associate professor of aerospace, mechanical, and nuclear engineering at Rensselaer Polytechnic Institute, where he and collaborators conducted experimental lightcraft launches at the White Sands Missile Range High Energy Laser System Test Facility (HELSTF). He collaborated on hypersonic aerodynamics research with the Brazilian Air Force and the U.S. Air Force Research Laboratory, and promoted space-based solar power and power-beaming concepts for space launch and high-speed travel.

== Academic career ==
Myrabo attended Iowa State University, where he studied aerospace engineering. In 1963, while a student, he was invited to join a research program at McDonnell Aircraft Corporation. Myrabo achieved a PhD in engineering physics from the University of California, San Diego in 1976. Prior to beginning his academic career, Myrabo worked for a time in the private aerospace industry, including Braddock Dunn & McDonald (later TRW Inc. and Northrop Grumman). He was an associate professor of aerospace, mechanical and nuclear engineering at Rensselaer Polytechnic Institute (RPI) from 1983 to his retirement. At RPI, he collaborated with the U.S. Air Force on Lightcraft experiments at White Sands Missile Range, work documented in trade coverage by Laser Focus World. He originated the Lightcraft research program at RPI. Myrabo's professorship encompassed three engineering fields: in addition to aerospace, he also taught mechanical and nuclear engineering until his retirement.

== Lightcraft research and propulsion concepts ==
Laser propulsion was developed through the 1970s in early proposals and subsequent practical work, including that of Arthur Kantrowitz, Alexander Prokhorov, and F.V. Bunkin. Myrabo's lightcraft concept, initially conceived in the 1960s, was later developed and tested at White Sands Missile Range. In 1983, a NASA-sponsored study authored by Myrabo at the BDM Corporation outlined his propulsion concept, which proposed using beams to ionize air in front of a vehicle to generate thrust. According to the German Aerospace Center (DLR), the technical term lightcraft is associated with Myrabo's Lightcraft Technology Demonstrator.

Prior to 1988, much of Myrabo's Lightcraft research was "limited to paper studies", according to CNN. Wired reported that he first developed the technologies that became Lightcraft in 1988. At the time, he was working on the "Star Wars" missile defense initiative under the Ballistic Missile Defense Organization. Myrabo was identified in 2008 at the AIP Conference Proceedings as having "initiated" the concept of "repetitively pulsed laser propulsion". Ad Astra in 2010 identified Myrabo as the "lead researcher" and patent holder of the technologies. In 2025, the journal Aerospace wrote that Myrabo had validated the Lightcraft concept by October 2000.

According to Aerospace, Myrabo's team used a carbon dioxide laser with a pulse-average power of 10 kW, propelling a lightcraft to a height of 71 m over 13 s. Ad Astra described the design as using a ground-based laser focused at the underside of the craft into an "absorption chamber". It reported that, as described there, the surrounding air transitions to a plasma state at temperatures of between 18,000 and 54,000 °F, producing thrust. In the same article, the craft's projected performance was described as potentially difficult to track using existing remote sensing if built at full speed in space. The article also relayed a claim attributed there to the National Space Society that lightcraft might reach up to 10% of the speed of light.

=== Lightcraft development ===
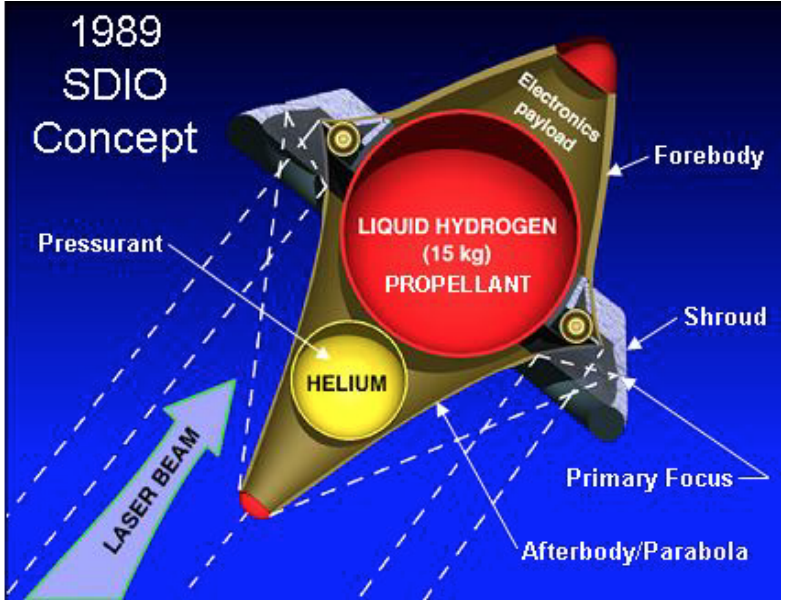
Lightcraft concept design from 1989

Lightcraft use a type of beam-powered propulsion. Myrabo's original definition of lightcraft treats it as any flight platform, airborne vehicle, or spacecraft propelled by a beam of light, including microwave or laser. Through the late 1980s and 1990s, Myrabo refined these ideas, adapting them to the limitations of then-available laser systems and promoting variations such as beamed microwave propulsion. He researched the project through the first successful launch in 1997, and participated in more than 140 test flights with various prototypes. Some of Myrabo's research was conducted at the Naval Research Laboratory.

During this period, Myrabo began experimental work at the High Energy Laser System Test Facility (HELSTF) at White Sands Missile Range and White Sands Test Center, where, in collaboration with the U.S. Air Force, he conducted his first outdoor Lightcraft flights. Between 1996 and 2000, prototypes powered by pulsed carbon dioxide lasers reached altitudes of up to 233 feet, milestones that Myrabo compared to the modest early rockets of Robert H. Goddard. Speaking with CNN, Myrabo compared his early Lightcraft research to the level of Goddard's own progress through 1926. Science writer Paul Gilster of The Planetary Society detailed several of Myrabo's experiments and tests of Lightcraft and related research during this period.

In 1998, the NASA John H. Glenn Research Center at Lewis Field asked Myrabo to work on development of Lightcraft with a then $50,000/year USD research grant. In addition, the Lawrence Livermore National Laboratory granted Myrabo and a team a $1,000,000 USD program to also develop the program. The Associated Press reported that Myrabo's research was also funded by the Strategic Defense Initiative, known at the time as the Star Wars program. Over time, Myrabo and his partners carried out more than 140 small-scale test flights. According to CNN, he first conceived of the technical implementation around 1988, and in 1998 described the Lightcraft research team as composed of Myrabo, Franklin Mead, HELSTF laser technicians, and RPI students. Tests at White Sands used a 20-hertz, 9-kilowatt carbon dioxide laser, with flights reaching altitudes of 75 feet in three seconds.

Myrabo was later involved in further laser propulsion research at Marshall Space Flight Center. According to Roger Luiden in 1998, a planning consultant at the Glenn Research Center, NASA became interested in Myrabo's ideas due to future concerns about fuel availability for spacecraft propulsion. An original goal of Myrabo's Lightcraft designs was to boost spacecraft unburdened by the weight of propellant fuels. In 2000, Luiden told the Associated Press that Myrabo's program has "got the potential, but it isn't been proven yet." Gregory Pope, the science and technology editor of Popular Mechanics, described Myrabo as belonging to a class of engineers who "perch outside the envelope and stir up trouble." The DLR's Institute of Technical Physics cites Myrabo's experiments at the U.S. Air Force Research Laboratory and a world-record Lightcraft flight as part of the backdrop for DLR taking up laser lightcraft research.

=== Advocacy and predictions ===
Myrabo coupled this experimental program with advocacy efforts for Lightcraft. He discussed variants of the lightcraft concept with Popular Mechanics in 1995, including the notion of using pulsed microwave beams from satellites to reduce drag on and propel lightcraft. In 1999, he published an article in Scientific American describing his vision of ground-based "LightPorts" and orbital power stations that could beam energy to passenger-carrying spacecraft.

He reiterated these claims at conferences in the 2000s, forecasting satellite launches at a thousand-fold cost reduction and predicting that by 2020 laser-powered craft could fly passengers globally in under an hour. While his optimism drew skepticism from other aerospace engineers, he remained confident that falling laser costs and rising fuel prices would make the technology commercially viable. Myrabo argued that the field had reached the threshold of commercial feasibility as laser costs fell to a few dollars per watt.

=== International collaborations ===
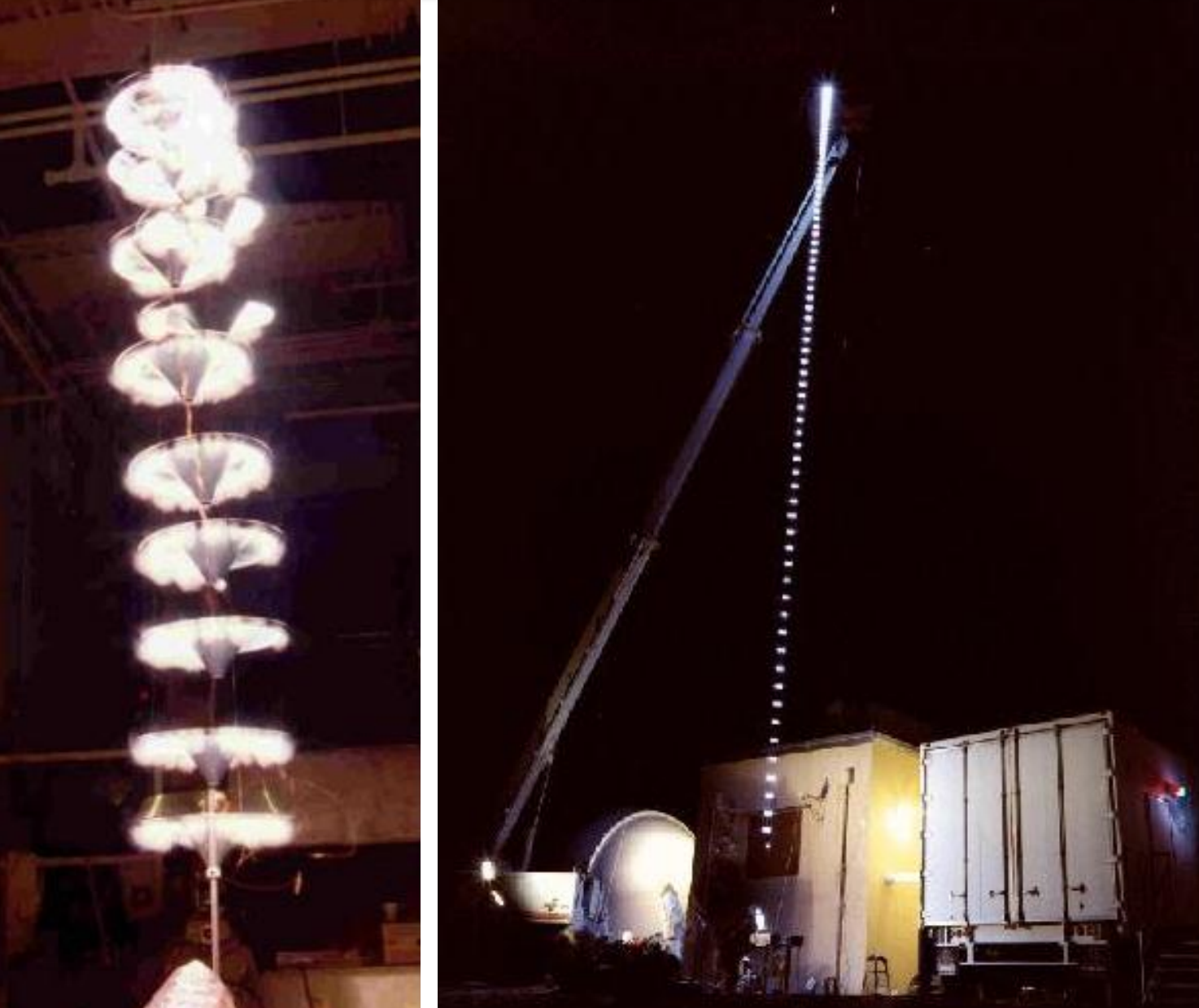
Lightcraft tests at White Sands Missile Range

International collaborations expanded his work beyond the United States. Yuri Raizer of the Russian Academy of Sciences worked with Myrabo on his Lightcraft. Beginning in the early 2000s, Myrabo joined Brazilian researchers in developing the Laser-Supported Directed Energy Air Spike (DEAS) concept, which used lasers to reduce drag on hypersonic test models. In 2005, their joint experiments demonstrated measurable aerodynamic benefits in wind tunnels, and by 2011 the project involved both the Brazilian Air Force and the U.S. Air Force Research Laboratory (AFOSR). Reporting at the time described the program as part of a broader "Brazil–USA" beamed-energy cooperation.

The Space Studies Institute in Princeton, New Jersey, also funded the Lightcraft program, and had Myrabo and Raizer study the option of using microwave energy for Lightcraft rather than laser-based propulsion. In 2010, the Journal of Propulsion and Power examined Myrabo's work, featuring commentary from the AFOSR, Los Alamos National Laboratory, and other academic facilities. Myrabo collaborated with students of Umeå University's Institute of Design to develop a video for the BBC's television program Wallace & Gromit's World of Invention, explaining how a lightcraft could fly from Umeå in Sweden to Hong Kong in China.

=== Publications and partnerships ===
Myrabo summarized three decades of research in the 2009 book Lightcraft Flight Handbook, LTI-20, co-authored with John Lewis. In addition to his faculty role at RPI, Myrabo founded Lightcraft Technologies, Inc., in Bennington, Vermont, to pursue experimental validation of beamed-energy flight. Myrabo and Lightcraft Technologies hold the Guinness World Record for laser powered altitude, achieved on October 2, 2000.

Later, Myrabo partnered with senior scientist Franklin Mead of the Air Force Research Laboratory's Propulsion Directorate at Edwards Air Force Base in California. By the late 2000s, he had been active in laser propulsion research for more than two decades, presenting his work at international aerospace forums. Wired noted that Myrabo considered jet propulsion outdated technology and was puzzled by the lack of excitement around laser-based propulsion.

== Professional leadership ==
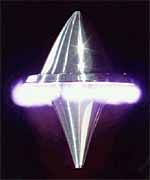
Lightcraft being propelled by laser

In 2003, while based in Bennington, Vermont, Myrabo was elected the first president of the newly created International Society for Beamed Energy Propulsion (ISBEP), established to promote global collaboration on beamed power research and applications. He described beamed energy propulsion as an emerging worldwide enterprise with the potential to transform both terrestrial transportation and access to space.

His election followed years of laboratory and field work, including an October 2000 test at White Sands Missile Range in New Mexico, where a Lightcraft set an altitude record on a column of laser light, which he presented as a validation of laser-propelled flight. He argued that further progress required converting large lasers and microwave generators already in operation into shared-user facilities for propulsion experiments.

He pointed to work at NASA's Marshall Space Flight Center and proposed additional proof-of-concept efforts, such as using a small orbital laser platform to accelerate a vehicle in space. He also stressed the need for improved flight control—likening it to the Wright brothers' innovations—as critical for reaching greater altitudes with power beaming.

Myrabo argued that existing physics and technology could enable a step change in propulsion by moving beyond chemical fuels to much higher energy densities. He predicted that future vehicles would surpass contemporary aerospace performance and eventually permit rapid global travel, routine orbit transfers, and transportation within the Earth–Moon system.

== Personal life and activities ==
Sioux City Symphony conductor Leo Kucinski was Myrabo's stepfather, and his mother was Irene Myrabo Kucinski. Myrabo is married to Christie, an environmental biologist. As a teenager, Myrabo developed a lifelong interest in flying fixed-wing model airplanes. He later expanded to quadcopter drones and first-person view remote flying, and as of 2016 was president of the Eagle's Eye FPV Club at William H. Morse State Airport in Bennington.

Through the 1980s, Myrabo and his family ran Wind Mist Farm, developed with staff and students from the Massachusetts Institute of Technology and Harvard University to operate with a passive solar building design. The Myrabos ultimately sold the farm when their careers relocated to Washington, D.C. Myrabo served as co-chair of the Whipstock Hill Preservation Society in Bennington.

== Affiliations and memberships ==
Myrabo is a member of the Experimental Aircraft Association (EAA). In 2021, the Aircraft Owners and Pilots Association listed him as an active major in the Vermont Wing of the Civil Air Patrol (CAP). He is also an officer in the Academy of Model Aeronautics (AMA) and has tested NIST drone and aerial robotics programs in his CAP role.

== Selected publications ==
=== Books ===
- Myrabo, Leik N.; Ing, Dean (1985). The Future of Flight. New York: Bean Enterprises.
- Myrabo, Leik N.; Lewis, John (2009). Lightcraft Flight Handbook, LTI-20. Bennington, Vermont: Lightcraft Technologies, Inc.

=== Conference proceedings ===
- Meloney, E. D.; Minucci, M. A. S.; Myrabo, Leik N.; Nagamatsu, H. T.; Bracken, R. M. (2000). "Experimental Investigation of a 2-D MHD Slipstream Accelerator and Generator". 36th AIAA Joint Propulsion Conference. American Institute of Aeronautics and Astronautics. AIAA 00-3486.
- Messitt, D. G.; Myrabo, Leik N.; Mead, Franklin B. Jr. (2000). "Laser Initiated Blast Wave for Launch Vehicle Propulsion". 36th AIAA Joint Propulsion Conference. American Institute of Aeronautics and Astronautics. AIAA 2000-3848.
- Minucci, M. A. S.; Bracken, R. M.; Nagamatsu, H. T.; Myrabo, Leik N.; Shanahan, K. J. (2000). "Experimental Investigation of an Electric Arc Simulated Air Spike in Hypersonic Flow". 38th Aerospace Sciences Meeting & Exhibit. American Institute of Aeronautics and Astronautics. AIAA 00-0715.
- Wang, T.-S.; Chen, Y.-S.; Liu, J.; Myrabo, Leik N.; Mead, Franklin B. Jr. (2000). "Performance Modeling of an Experimental Laser Propelled Lightcraft". 31st AIAA Plasmadynamics and Lasers Conference. American Institute of Aeronautics and Astronautics. AIAA 2000-2347.
- Myrabo, Leik N. (2001). "World Record Flights of Beam-Riding Rocket Lightcraft: Demonstration of Disruptive Propulsion Technology". 37th AIAA/ASME/SAE/ASEE Joint Propulsion Conference and Exhibit. American Institute of Aeronautics and Astronautics
- Kenoyer, David A.; Salvador, Ignacio I.; Myrabo, Leik N. (2011). "Beam-Riding Behavior of Lightcraft Engines with ≈ 1 μs Pulsed TEA CO₂ Laser". AIP Conference Proceedings.

=== Journal articles ===
- Wang, T.-S.; Chen, Y.-S.; Liu, J.; Myrabo, Leik N.; Mead, Franklin B. Jr. (2002). "Advanced Performance Modeling of Experimental Laser Lightcraft". Journal of Propulsion and Power. 18: 1129–1138.

== Filmography ==
- Future Flight, (1987), advisor for space flight
- Future Fantastic (1996), self
- Rocketships (1998), self - Rensselaer Polytechnic Institute
- Wallace & Gromit's World of Invention (2010), self - Lightcraft Scientist (as Dr Leik Myrabo)
