= Laser propulsion =

Form of beam-powered propulsion

Laser propulsion is a form of beam-powered propulsion where the energy source is a remote (usually ground-based) laser system and separate from the reaction mass. This form of propulsion differs from a conventional chemical rocket where both energy and reaction mass come from the solid or liquid propellants carried on board the vehicle.

There are two main approaches: off-board, where the laser source is external to the spacecraft, and onboard, where the laser is part of the spacecraft's propulsion system. Off-board laser propulsion, which includes laser-powered launches and laser light sails, eliminates the need for the spacecraft to carry its own energy source. Onboard laser propulsion involves using lasers in nuclear fusion or ionizing interstellar gas for propulsion.

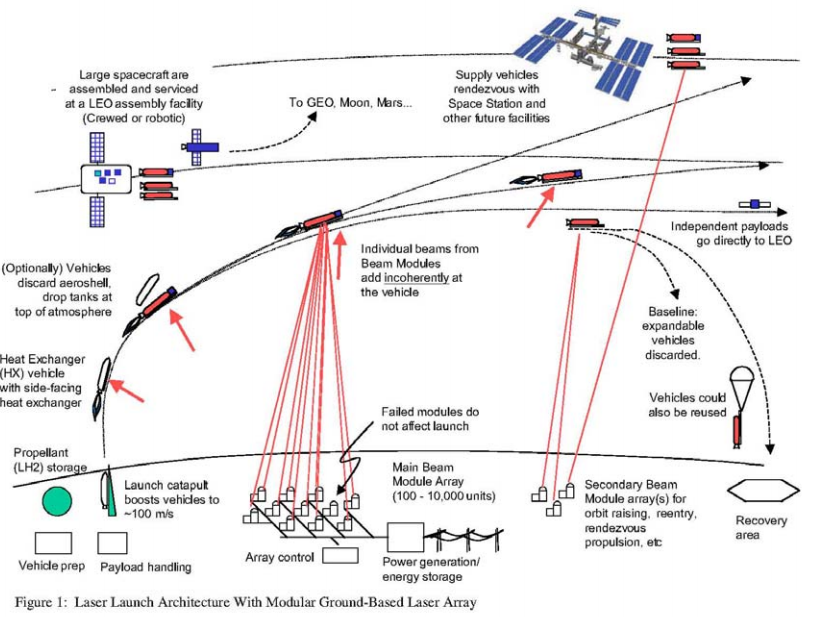
A laser launch Heat Exchanger Thruster system

== History ==
The basic concepts underlying a photon-propelled "sail" propulsion system were developed by Eugene Sanger and the Hungarian physicist György Marx. Propulsion concepts using laser-energized rockets were developed in the 1970s by Arthur Kantrowitz and Wolfgang Moekel, with a variant using laser ablation pioneered by Leik Myrabo. An exposition of Kantrowitz's laser propulsion ideas was published in 1988.

Laser propulsion systems may transfer momentum to a spacecraft in two different ways. The first way uses photon radiation pressure to drive momentum transfer and is the principle behind solar sails and laser sails. The second method uses the laser to help expel mass from the spacecraft as in a conventional rocket. Thus, the first uses the laser for both energy and reaction mass, while the second uses the laser for energy, but carries reaction mass. Thus, the second is fundamentally limited in final spacecraft velocities by the rocket equation.

== Laser-pushed lightsail ==
A laser-pushed lightsail is a thin reflective sail similar to a solar sail, in which the sail is being pushed by a laser, rather than the sun. The advantage of lightsail propulsion is that the vehicle does not carry either the energy source or the reaction mass for propulsion, and hence the limitations of the Tsiolkovsky rocket equation to achieving high velocities are avoided. Use of a laser-pushed lightsail was proposed initially by Marx in 1966, as a method of interstellar travel that would avoid extremely high mass ratios by not carrying fuel, and analyzed in detail by physicist Robert L. Forward in 1989. Further analysis of the concept was done by Landis, Mallove and Matloff, D. G. Andrews and others.

A large diameter beam is required so that only a small portion misses the sail due to diffraction, and the spacecraft must have strong pointing stability capabilities so it can tilt its sails fast enough to follow the center of the beam. These requirements increase in importance as mission complexity increases, such as when moving from interplanetary to interstellar missions, and when moving from flyby missions to one-way landing missions and then to return missions.

The laser may alternatively consist of a large phased array of small devices that receive their energy directly from solar radiation.

The laser-pushed sail is proposed as a method of propelling a small interstellar probe by the Breakthrough Starshot project.

Another method of moving a much larger spacecraft to high velocities is by using a laser system to propel a stream of much smaller sails. Each alternative mini sail is slowed down by a laser from the home system so that they collide at ionising velocities. The ionising collisions could then be used to interact with a powerful magnetic field on the spacecraft to provide a force to power and move it.

An extension of the idea is to utilize nuclear materials on the mini sails. These materials would undergo fission or fusion, greatly increasing the magnitude of the imparted force. However, this approach would require much higher collision velocities compared to non-nuclear implementations.

=== Photon recycling ===
Metzgar and Landis proposed a variant on the laser-pushed sail, in which the photons reflected from the sail are re-used by re-reflecting them back to the sail by a stationary mirror; a "multi-bounce laser-based sail." This amplifies the force produced by recycling the photons, resulting in considerably higher force produced from the same laser power. There is also a multi-bounce photonic sail configuration which uses a large Fresnel lens around a laser generating system. In this configuration the laser shines light on a probe sail accelerating it outwards which is then reflected back through the Fresnel lens to be reflected off a larger more massive reflector probe going in the other direction. The laser light is reflected back and forth many times improving the force transmitted but importantly allows the large lens to remain in a more stable position as it is not greatly influenced by the laser lights momentum.

An optical cavity allows greater re-use of photons, but keeping the beam in the cavity becomes much more challenging. An optical cavity can be made with two high-reflectance mirrors, forming a Fabry–Pérot optical resonance cavity in which any small movement of mirrors would destroy the resonance condition and null photonic thrust. Such optical cavities are used for gravitational wave detection as in LIGO, for their extreme sensitivity to the movement of mirror. Bae originally proposed to use photon recycling for use in a nanometer accuracy formation flight of satellites for this reason. Bae, however, discovered that in an active optical cavity formed by two high-reflectance mirrors and a laser gain medium in between, similar to the typical laser cavity, photon recycling becomes less sensitive to the movement of mirrors. Bae named the laser thruster based on the photon recycling in an active optical cavity Photonic Laser Thruster (PLT). In 2015 his team demonstrated the number of photon recycling up to 1,540 over a distance of a few meters and photonic thrusts up to 3.5 mN with the use of a 500 W laser system. In a laboratory demonstration, a CubeSat (0.75 kg in weight) was propelled with PLT.

== Laser energized rocket ==
There are several forms of laser propulsion in which the laser is used as an energy source to provide momentum to propellant that is carried on board the rocket. The use of a laser as the energy source means that the energy provided to the propellant is not limited by the chemical energy of the propellant.

=== Laser thermal rocket ===
The laser thermal rocket (heat exchanger (HX) thruster) is a thermal rocket in which the propellant is heated by energy provided by an external laser beam. The beam heats a solid heat exchanger, which in turn heats an inert liquid propellant, converting it to hot gas which is exhausted through a conventional nozzle. This is similar in principle to nuclear thermal and solar thermal propulsion. Using a large flat heat exchanger allows the laser beam to shine directly on the heat exchanger without focusing optics on the vehicle. The HX thruster has the advantage of working equally well with any laser wavelength and both CW and pulsed lasers, and of having an efficiency approaching 100%. The HX thruster is limited by the heat exchanger material and by radiative losses to relatively low gas temperatures, typically 1000–2000 °C. For a given temperature, the specific impulse is maximized with the minimum molecular weight reaction mass, and with hydrogen propellant, that provides sufficient specific impulse as high as 600–800 seconds, high enough in principle to allow single stage vehicles to reach low Earth orbit. The HX laser thruster concept was developed by Jordin Kare in 1991; a similar microwave thermal propulsion concept was developed independently by Kevin L. Parkin at Caltech in 2001.

A variation on this concept was proposed by John Sinko and Clifford Schlecht as a redundant safety concept for assets on orbit. Packets of enclosed propellants are attached to the outside of a space suit, and exhaust channels run from each packet to the far side of the astronaut or tool. A laser beam from a space station or shuttle vaporizes the propellant inside the packs. Exhaust is directed behind the astronaut or tool, pulling the target towards the laser source. To brake the approach, a second wavelength is used to ablate the exterior of the propellant packets on the near side.

In 2022 a paper was published by researchers from McGill University proposing a laser thermal propulsion system to be used to send a spacecraft to Mars in 45 days. One of the main advantages of using the proposed laser thermal propulsion system for sending spacecraft to Mars is reducing astronaut exposure to cosmic rays by reducing the transit time outside of Earth's Magnetosphere.

=== Laser mirror rocket ===
In this design a lens and/or parabolic mirror focuses laser light into a small hole in a mirror that leads into a tube which is highly reflective inside and completely open at the other end. A phased-array laser is pulsed from Earth at the spacecraft where the laser light is focused into the tube to a waiting mobile mirror disc which will be the reaction mass. The pulse of laser light becomes trapped in the tube, bouncing back and forth and accelerating the mirror disc out at very high velocity. The mirrors are moved into position inside the tube from magazines on the side of the craft after the laser pulse has switched off. Accelerations of millions of g's are possible for these small highly reflective mirrors, and velocities over short distances can reach into the tens of kilometers per second, allowing specific impulses in the thousands. For example if a mirror disc is accelerated over 10 m at 2 million g it will reach a velocity of 20 km/s at the exit, this is over four times higher than the exhaust velocity of a hydrogen/oxygen rocket motor which is around 4.5 km/s. A comparison of specific impulses between the space shuttle's hydrogen/oxygen engines which has a specific impulse of 453 and the above cited example yields a specific impulse of 2034 for the mirror rocket which is a significant improvement. Clever control of the discs would allow much longer acceleration periods as well and therefore higher exit velocities. Jordin Kare calculated that these mirrored discs could theoretically be pushed to around 32 million g but would be at the limit of any material's strength and subject to total failure. The propulsion design can be used on spacecraft going out directly from Earth's orbit or coming towards the Earth as in a returning elliptical orbit.

=== Ablative laser propulsion ===
Ablative laser propulsion (ALP) is a form of beam-powered propulsion in which an external pulsed laser is used to burn off a plasma plume from a solid metal propellant, thus producing thrust. The measured specific impulse of small ALP setups is very high at about 5000 s (49 kN·s/kg), and unlike the lightcraft developed by Leik Myrabo which uses air as the propellant, ALP can be used in space.

Material is directly removed from a solid or liquid surface at high velocities by pulsed laser ablation. Depending on the laser flux and pulse duration, the material can be simply heated and evaporated, or converted to plasma. Ablative propulsion will work in air or vacuum. Specific impulse values from 200 seconds to several thousand seconds are possible by choosing the propellant and laser pulse characteristics. Variations of ablative propulsion include double-pulse propulsion in which one laser pulse ablates material and a second laser pulse further heats the ablated gas, laser micropropulsion in which a small laser on board a spacecraft ablates very small amounts of propellant for attitude control or maneuvering, and space debris removal, in which the laser ablates material from debris particles in low Earth orbit, changing their orbits and causing them to reenter.

University of Alabama Huntsville Propulsion Research Center has researched ALP.

=== Pulsed plasma propulsion ===
A high energy pulse focused in a gas or on a solid surface surrounded by gas produces breakdown of the gas (usually air). This causes an expanding shock wave which absorbs laser energy at the shock front (a laser sustained detonation wave or LSD wave); expansion of the hot plasma behind the shock front during and after the pulse transmits momentum to the craft. Pulsed plasma propulsion using air as the working fluid is the simplest form of air-breathing laser propulsion. The record-breaking lightcraft, developed by Leik Myrabo of RPI (Rensselaer Polytechnic Institute) and Frank Mead, works on this principle.

Another concept of pulsed plasma propulsion is being investigated by Prof. Hideyuki Horisawa.

=== CW plasma propulsion ===
A continuous laser beam focused in a flowing stream of gas creates a stable laser sustained plasma which heats the gas; the hot gas is then expanded through a conventional nozzle to produce thrust. Because the plasma does not touch the walls of the engine, very high gas temperatures are possible, as in gas core nuclear thermal propulsion. However, to achieve high specific impulse, the propellant must have low molecular weight; hydrogen is usually assumed for actual use, at specific impulses around 1,000 seconds. CW plasma propulsion has the disadvantage that the laser beam must be precisely focused into the absorption chamber, either through a window or by using a specially-shaped nozzle. CW plasma thruster experiments were performed in the 1970s and 1980s, primarily by Dennis Keefer of UTSI and Herman Krier of the University of Illinois at Urbana–Champaign.

=== Pellet-beam propulsion ===
This proposal would require two spacecraft: one that travels and another in Earth orbit to propel the former. The second spacecraft would fire thousands of metal pellets at the first. It would either shoot a laser at the first spacecraft or align a laser from the Earth at the first spacecraft. The laser would ablate some material from each pellet, propelling them at high speeds (>120 km/s) to provide thrust to the spacecraft. This method could allow a spacecraft to reach the outer planets in less than a year, 100 AU from the Sun in 3 years and the solar gravitational lens in 15 years. It would also be able to propel heavier spacecraft than other propulsion concepts (~1 ton in mass).

=== Laser electric propulsion ===
A general class of propulsion techniques in which the laser beam power is converted to electricity, which then powers some type of electric propulsion thruster.

A small quadcopter has flown for 12 hours and 26 minutes charged by a 2.25 kW laser (powered at less than half of its normal operating current), using 170 watt photovoltaic arrays as the power receiver, and a laser has been demonstrated to charge the batteries of an unmanned aerial vehicle in flight for 48 hours.

For spacecraft, laser electric propulsion is considered as a competitor to solar electric or nuclear electric propulsion for low-thrust propulsion in space. However, Leik Myrabo has proposed high-thrust laser electric propulsion, using magnetohydrodynamics to convert laser energy to electricity and to electrically accelerate air around a vehicle for thrust.

== See also ==
- Elevator:2010
- List of laser articles
- Optical lift
- Rocket engine
- Spacecraft propulsion
