= Leik =

Leik is a masculine given name and a surname. Notable people with the name include:

- Dwayne Leik (born 1964), American NASCAR driver
- Leik Myrabo (fl. 1983), American aerospace engineer
