= Government contractor =

Firm which produces goods and/or services under contract for the government

A government contractor is a company (privately owned, publicly traded or a state-owned enterprise) – either for profit or non-profit – that produces goods or services under contract for the government. Some communities are largely sustained by government contracting activity; for instance, much of the economy of Northern Virginia consists of government contractors employed directly or indirectly by the federal government of the United States.

== Terminology ==
Frequently a term public contractor is used to describe the government contractor.

In ancient Rome, term publican was used for private individuals that performed work on public buildings, supplied Roman armies, or collected taxes.

== United Kingdom ==
Section 12(2) and (3) of the Official Secrets Act 1989 define the expression "Government Contractor" for the purposes of that Act.

== United States ==
The United States federal government seeks to select contractors in a way that is fair to all and promotes the free market system. Contractors are selected via Federal Acquisition Regulations which are intended by Congress to ensure that taxpayer money is used to benefit the public or nation as a whole. Contractors must learn how to operate within these regulations.

=== Prime contractor ===
Prime contractor is a term defined in the US law. Statutory definitions of prime contract, prime contractor, subcontract, and subcontractor are in 41 U.S.C. § 8701. The prime contractor term was already defined before the 8 March 1946 passage of An Act To eliminate the practice by subcontractors, under cost-plus-a-fixed-fee or cost reimbursable contacts of the United States, of paying fees or kick-backs, or of granting gifts or gratuities to employees of a cost-plus-a-fixed-fee or cost reimbursable prime contractors or of higher tier subcontractors for the purpose of securing the award of subcontracts or orders. (Pub. L.Tooltip Public Law (United States) 79–319, 60 Stat. 37)

== See also ==
- Defense contractor
- Beltway bandit
- Private prison

== Sources ==
- Nicastro, Luke A. (12 October 2023). "The U.S. Defense Industrial Base: Background and Issues for Congress (R47751)". Congressional Research Service.
- Carril, Rodrigo; Duggan, Mark (2020). "The impact of industry consolidation on government procurement: Evidence from Department of Defense contracting". Journal of Public Economics. 184 104141. doi:10.1016/j.jpubeco.2020.104141.
