= International Relief and Development Inc. =

International aid organization

International Relief and Development Inc. (IRD), renamed Blumont
- Founded: 1998
- Type: Nonprofit organization
- Purpose: International development
- Location: Arlington, Virginia, United States
- Key people: Arthur B. Keys Jr. (founder); Jonathan Nash (President and CEO)
- Website: www.blumont.org
- Renamed Blumont in 2016.

International Relief and Development, Inc. (IRD), renamed Blumont, is an organization that purports to provide relief, stabilization, and development programs worldwide. In 2015, IRD was the subject of a Washington Post investigation that highlighted the organization's performance and management of taxpayer money. Among other irregularities, the organization had charged the US Government $1.1 million for staff parties and retreats at exclusive resorts. In January 2016, IRD announced that it was changing its name to Blumont and relocating to Madison, Wisconsin.

According to Blumont, its mission is to deliver "innovative, evidence based, locally driven solutions that advance the aspirations of people, communities and donor partners worldwide". In 2011, more than 80% of IRD's $500 million annual budget came from USAID. In recent years, Blumont has completed work in the Middle East, South America, Asia, and Africa for governmental entities in the U.S. and Britain, such as USAID and DFID and for organizations such as the World Bank and the United Nations.

== Leadership ==
=== Founder ===
Dr. Arthur B. Keys Jr. founded IRD in 1998. As of 2012, Keys claimed more than 30 years of experience with domestic and international humanitarian assistance, economic development, and food/agriculture programs and oversaw nearly $525 million annually for global development assistance. According to 2007 tax records, Keys was paid $552,722, more than the salary of his counterparts at similar organizations. Keys' wife, daughter and brother-in-law took home an additional $265,278 in salary and benefits. In 2015, it was reported that federal investigators were examining the expenses of Keys and his wife, Jasna Basaric-Keys.

Amid investigation, Keys retired from IRD and moved to a farm in Western Pennsylvania's Washington County in 2015. Previously, Keys was the executive director of Interfaith Impact for Justice and Peace, the Secretary for Public Ministries of the United Church Board for Homeland Ministries, and the president of the consulting firm Keys and Associates.

Keys is a native of Washington, Pennsylvania. He has a Doctorate from Emory University and a Master of Divinity from Yale University. He received his bachelor's degree from Bethany College. He is currently a member of the board of trustees at Bethany. He was awarded an honorary Doctorate in Humane Letters from Bethany. He is also the recipient of the William Sloane Coffin ’56 Award for Justice and Peace given annually by Yale Divinity School and was honored in Atlanta as a 2011 Emory University History Maker and by the Emory University Alumni Board with the 2009 Emory Medal for his years of humanitarian service.

=== President & CEO ===
Roger Ervin assumed leadership of IRD in December 2014, and now serves as the president and CEO of Blumont. Ervin has been working for over 28 years in government, academic and private sector roles. Before Blumont, Ervin worked as Senior Vice President for Global Markets at LMI. He also teaches management courses as an adjunct professor at the University of Wisconsin School of Business and at the UW Department of Political Science

== Operations ==
Much of IRD's work for USAID is performed under cooperative agreements, which are more flexible than contracts, with fewer deadlines and demands. The arrangement makes it difficult to hold IRD accountable because deadlines and deliverables are rarely specified. For years, USAID relied heavily on these agreements, partly because they required less oversight from the agency, according to government auditors. The company's rapid acquisition of USAID contracts has prompted some to label it a Beltway Bandit.

Employees who left IRD were asked to sign confidentiality agreements stipulating that they could be sued for making disparaging remarks about the organization, potentially violating whistleblower protection

In 2015, USAID suspended IRD from future federal contracting. Among other irregularities, the organization had charged the US Government $1.1 million for staff parties and retreats at exclusive resorts. but IRD filed suit and a district court voided the suspension. The court led by Judge Royce Lamberth found that USAID had not followed several federal guidelines in its investigation of IRD, and ruled their suspension illegal. USAID nullified and vacated the suspension and retracted any statements asserting that the suspension was valid or appropriate. Employees who left IRD were asked to sign confidentiality agreements.

IRD routinely hired individuals who previously worked for USAID, including former acting administrator Alonzo Fulgham. In 2014, it was reported that at least 19 former USAID employees had been hired, some of whom were previously responsible for oversight of the organization.

IRD hired the lobbying firm Wexler & Walker to develop its media strategy. Their 2010 guidance said that the most important message for senior IRD officials to remember is “We help the most vulnerable people in some of the most insecure parts of the developing world.”'

=== Afghanistan ===
In Afghanistan, IRD provided numerous large scale projects for USAID. It administered a three-year, $400 million project to build roads in southern and eastern provinces of the country.

Multiple problems were identified in IRD's agricultural work in Afghanistan, which involved spending $300 million to help farmers in Kandahar and Helmand provinces. Many of the goods meant for farmers were sold in Pakistan and distorted the local market. Afghan officials derided features of the programming, such as paying farmers for work they would do anyway. IRD claims to have provided 5.4 million days of labor to unemployed men and generated an estimated $200 million through distributed seed. USAID decided not to award an extension of the program to IRD though it provided interim extensions until another implementer could be found.

In June 2020, the company was sued for with paying bribes, or protection money, to the Taliban in a lawsuit brought by families of American victims. During its lucrative work in Afghanistan, Blumont (then IRD), may have violated the Anti-Terrorism Act which makes it illegal for any individual or entity to provide material support to the Taliban.

=== Balkans ===
In 2001 IRD was one of five NGOs selected by USAID to implement the Community Development through Democratic Action (CRDA) Program in Serbia. The program cost US taxpayers $200 million and ran from 2001 to 2006. The program aimed to increase civic participation in democratic institutions; provide vocational training; increase local economic output through grants, seminars and counseling.

Multiple problems were identified. These include an absence of a monitoring and evaluation system, the termination of activities supporting citizen participation too soon and too abruptly, and the absence of sustainability strategies.

=== Colombia ===
Blumont, along with the Colombian government's Victims' Unit and the Norwegian Refugee Council, implemented programming/workshops in Puerto Torres, Caquetá Department, in September 2018 to "diagnose the damage suffered by the inhabitants of the region" as it relates to armed conflict and the displacement and missing persons associated with it. Workshops help survivors of armed conflict reflect on their lives before, what happened during the conflict, and what damages it has caused afterward.

Also in Puerto Torres, Blumont contributed resources to build a communal structure, toolkits, and sports equipment for use in public meetings and educational events.

=== Indonesia ===
IRD's first major project was food-aid program in Indonesia that one source has called pioneering. Funded by US taxpayers, IRD took USAID donated wheat and distributed it to noodle factories to increase output and lower prices. IRD provided logistical and managerial support and was able to collect part of the profits from the sale of the noodles. These profits subsequently went into further community reinvestments. The program became a template for similar projects in Cambodia, Niger and Sri Lanka.

=== Iraq ===
In Iraq, USAID funded $644 million to IRD to implement the Community Stabilization Program, a jobs and public works program Iraq. At times, IRD spent more than $1 million a day of USAID money. In a March 2008 audit, the USAID inspector general in Baghdad expressed concern that millions of dollars may have been siphoned off by insurgents. In July 2009, USAID suspended IRD's work on the Community Stabilization Program, citing evidence of phantom jobs in addition to possible financial support to insurgents.

IRD entered Iraq in 2003 as an implementing partner on the Community Action Program (CAP). The goal of the program was to organize local communities and assist them in prioritizing and implementing regional reconstruction projects. It was closely modeled after community stabilization programs in the Balkans, which IRD had been a part of.

A comprehensive audit of the program found that while IRD accomplished some of the stated goals, it overstated the number of beneficiaries. IRD's completed projects often did not target the prioritized needs of the neighborhoods. Better oversight was needed to deal with frequent shifts in implementation strategies due to the volatile situation in the field. The program was extended twice in 2006 and 2008.

Like other organizations in Iraq, IRD found itself unprepared to deal with the deteriorating security situation, and several of the local council officials it was working with were assassinated. It significantly increased spending on security personnel and other administrative overhead to provide better oversight. Additionally many projects were revised to yield results faster and concentrated to only a few neighborhoods.

=== Jordan ===
In Zaatari refugee camp in Jordan, UNHCR and Blumont worked alongside many international partners Refugee GIS, RefuGIS. RefuGIS is a project that uses hands-on training in mapping to give refugees in Zaatari empowerment and access to enriched livelihoods and education. It is the "world's first GIS project for refugees, by refugees."

In January 2018, Angelina Jolie made a visit to Zaatari Camp to visit the TIGER (These Inspiring Girls Enjoy Reading) project, which focuses on education and empowerment in displacement. The UNHCR project, in partnership with IRD/Blumont, is designed to fight the epidemic of refugees dropping out of school. In 2017, the TIGER girls project was presented a special award at the Arab Women of the Year 2017 ceremony.

In February 2018, the Peace and Sport organization announced new activities focused on peace building in Zaatari Camp, launched in collaboration with IRD/Blumont, as well as UNHCR, the International Table Tennis Federation, the Fédération Internationale de Teqball, and the World Association of Kickboxing Organizations. The activities include sports coaching seminars for refugees, as well as working with the Zaatari Women Commission and the TIGER girls to promote the program and disseminate "peace values and gender equity through sport activities."

=== Mali ===
In Mali, IRD/Blumont, under DFID's BRACED program, is implementing the "Wati Yelema Labenw" program that is strengthening resilience to climate disasters of vulnerable populations in Koulikoro, Segou, and Mopti. Through work on social cohesion, livelihoods, natural resource management and governance, the program directly reaches 2,400 people and builds off the results of the previous RIC4REC project (Strengthening Community Initiatives for Climate Resilience).

=== Pakistan ===
Blumont and partner organization implement the USAID-funded Sindh Community Mobilization Program (CMP) as part of USAID and the Government of Sindh's Sindh Basic Education Program. The five-year program operates in Khairpur, Sukkur, Larkana, Dadu, Kamber Shahdadkot, Jacobabad, and Kashmore and five towns in Karachi. The program utilizes community mobilization to work toward increasing the enrollment of girls in schools and improving kids' health and hygiene.

=== Palestine ===
In Palestine, Blumont Engineering Solutions is the contractor for the Yatta Distribution Pipeline, funded by USAID for US$17.6 million. The project will construct 20 km of new transmission pipelines and connectors and 40 km of new distribution pipelines to supply water to unserved or poorly served areas.
