= Bernard Dunn =

Bernard Dunn may refer to:

- Bernard J. Dunn (1924–2009), American scientist and entrepreneur
- Bernie Dunn (1944–2018), Australian politician
