= Project Forward (interstellar) =

Hypothetical technology

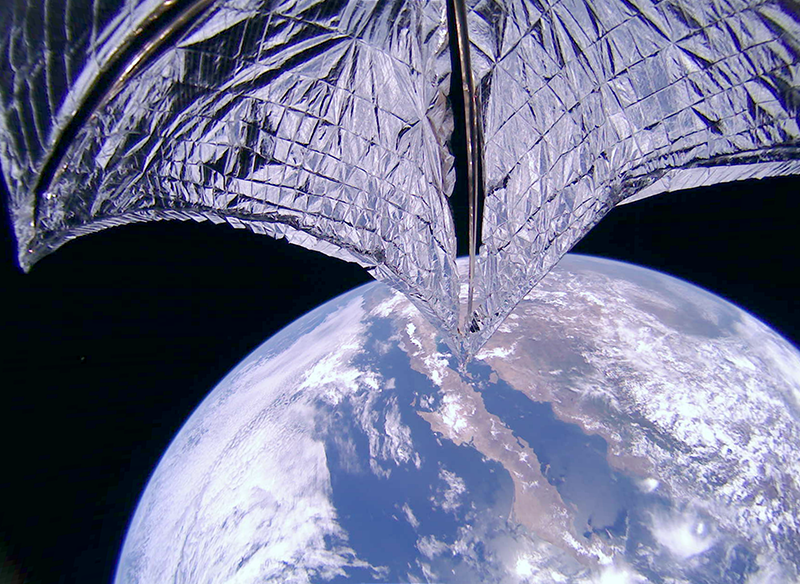
LightSail 2 with deployed solar sail

Project Forward was launched in 2011 with the purpose of exploring beamed energy propulsion. The project aims to analyze and assess past beamed-powered concepts, describe the construction of sail designs, and provide a starsail system concept. Challenges include lossy divergence of the beam as well as sail design at feasible sizes.
