= Braddock Dunn & McDonald =

American technical services firm, 1959–1997

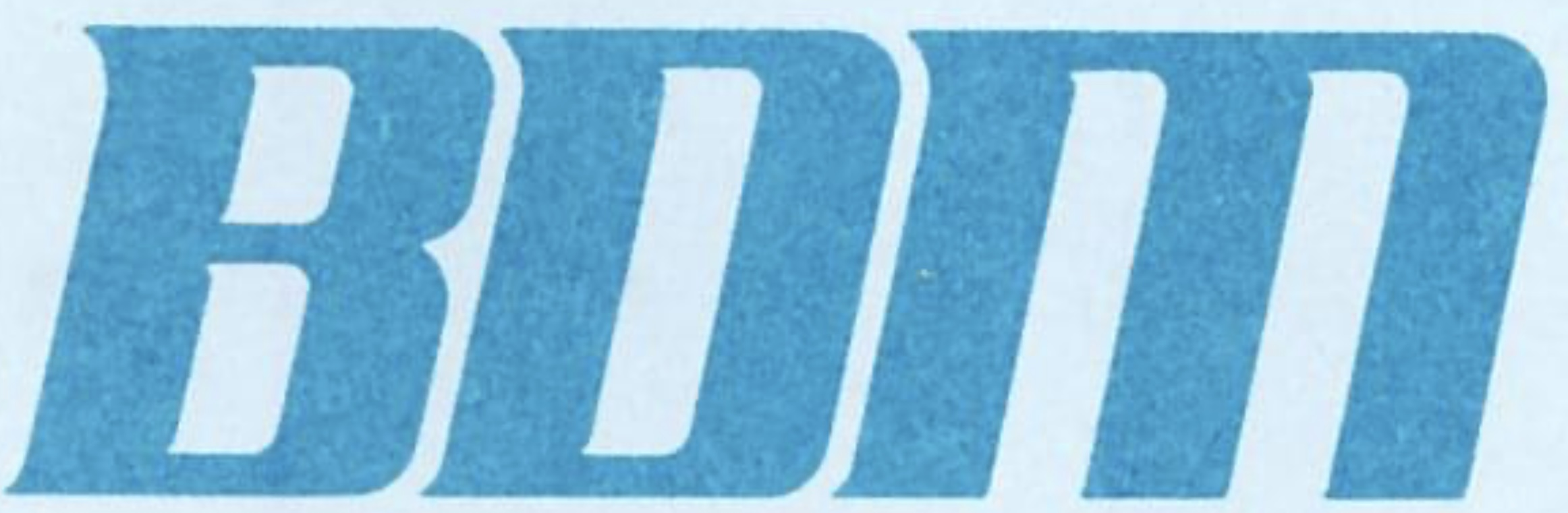
Braddock, Dunn & McDonald Company initials

Braddock, Dunn & McDonald, later known as BDM, then BDM International, was a technical services firm founded in 1959 in New York City. Its founders were Dr. Joseph V. Braddock, Dr. Bernard J. Dunn, and Dr. Daniel F. McDonald, who each received a PhD from Fordham University in the Bronx, New York. In 1997, TRW purchased BDM, and in 2002 Northrop Grumman bought TRW.

== Move to Texas ==
Within a year of its founding, the company moved to El Paso, Texas, to be close to the U.S. Army's Air Defense Center at Fort Bliss, Texas, the White Sands Missile Range in New Mexico, and Holloman Air Force Base, also in New Mexico. The founders offered their experience in missile guidance, applied optics, electronic instrumentation, and radiation physics to the U.S. Defense Department, primarily to the U.S. Army.

== Williams hired ==
A few years later the three founders hired Earle Williams, an engineer with a degree from Auburn University in Alabama, who eventually became president and CEO. He led the company through a time of rapid growth and expansion. Among Williams's most significant decisions was to move BDM to the Virginia suburbs of Washington, D.C., a few miles west of the Pentagon. That location offered the company a better opportunity to compete for defense contracts than it could from El Paso. For the rest of its existence as a company it occupied a series of ever-larger office spaces in an unincorporated area known as Tysons Corner, Virginia, formed by the interchange of the newly completed Capital Beltway and Virginia Routes 7 and 123.

== Rapid growth ==
The company grew rapidly, along with Tysons Corner. In the early 1960s Tysons Corner was a sleepy crossroads, but has since grown into a classic "edge city", and a home of many government and military contractors. Williams promoted the area as a suitable place for technology-oriented firms. Tysons Corner and the surrounding towns became the home of many of BDM's competitors, including Planning Research Corporation, DynCorp International, and CACI. Although all competed with BDM, in the buildup of defense budgets in the late 20th century, nearly all prospered. For a time, the press referred to these companies as "Beltway bandit", the phrase was originally a mild insult, implying that the companies preyed like bandits on the generosity of the federal government. Employees of those companies, including BDM President Earle Williams, took offense to that term.

Although the location of the headquarters of these defense contractors was part of an overall trend of movement to the suburbs beginning in the 1960s, BDM played a leading role in the specifics of this movement into the Virginia suburbs of Washington.

== Change in ownership ==
In 1988, BDM was purchased by Ford Aerospace and became a part of Ford Motor Company. In 1990, Ford Aerospace was sold to Loral Corporation and BDM was spun off to the Carlyle Group. In 1997, BDM was purchased by TRW, an aerospace systems and technical services company, which in turn was acquired by Northrop Grumman in 2002.

== Bibliography ==
- Ceruzzi, Paul E. (2008). Internet Alley: High Technology in Tysons Corner, 1945-2005. Cambridge, Massachusetts: MIT Press. ISBN 978-0-262-03374-9. JSTOR j.ctt5vjqs8. LCCN 2007018932. OCLC 1020553374.
- Axelrod, Alan (2014). Mercenaries: A Guide to Private Armies and Private Military Companies. Thousand Oaks, California: CQ Press. doi:10.4135/9781483340319. ISBN 978-1-60871-248-9. LCCN 2013023905. OCLC 849641673.
