= Laser broom =

Ground-based laser beam-powered system to clear space debris

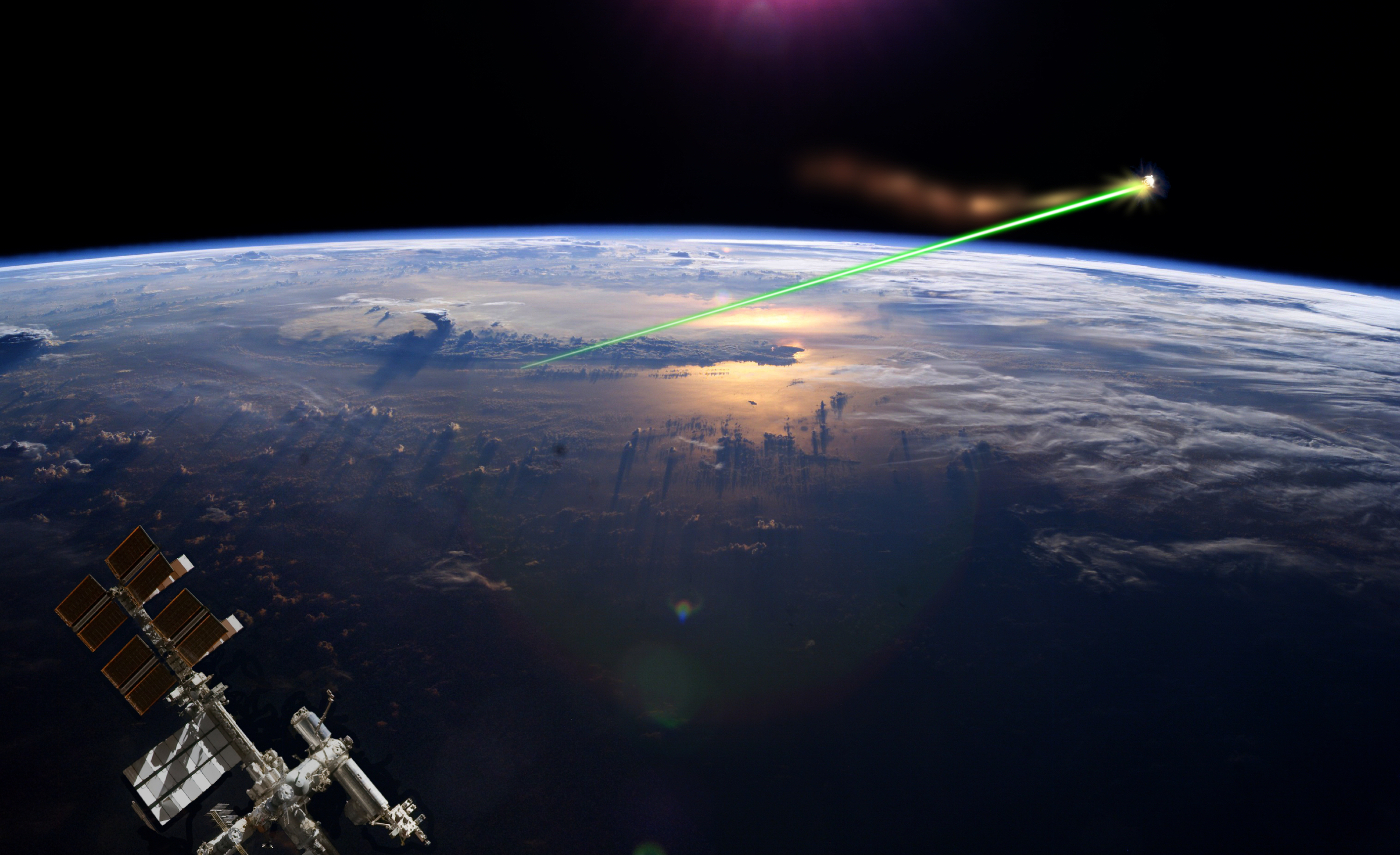
Artistic representation

A laser broom is a proposed ground-based laser beam-powered propulsion system that sweeps space debris out of the path of artificial satellites (such as the International Space Station) to prevent collateral damage to space equipment. It heats up one side of the debris to shift its orbit trajectory, altering the path to hit the atmosphere sooner. Space researchers have proposed that a laser broom may help mitigate Kessler syndrome, a runaway cascade of collision events between orbiting objects. Additionally, laser broom systems mounted on satellites or space station have also been proposed.

== Mechanism ==
Laser brooms are proposed to target space debris between one and ten centimetres (0.4–3.9 in) in diameter. Collisions with these high-velocity debris not only cause considerable damage to the satellites but secondary fragmented debris from the collided satellite parts. A laser broom is intended to be used at a high power to penetrate through the atmosphere and ablate material from the targeted debris. The ablating material imparts a small thrust that lowers its orbital perigee towards the upper atmosphere, thereby increasing drag so that its remaining orbital life is cut short. The laser would operate in a pulsed fashion to avoid the target from self-shielding via its ablated plasma. The power levels of lasers in this concept are well below the power levels in concepts for more rapidly effective anti-satellite weapons.

Research into this field reveal the precise physical constraints required, noting the significant relevance to the space debris's orientation and resultant trajectory of the ablated object. Using a laser guide star and adaptive optics, a sufficiently large ground-based laser (1 megajoule pulsed HF laser) can offset the orbits of dozens of debris daily at a reasonable cost.

== History ==
The Space Shuttle routinely showed evidence of "tiny" impacts upon post-flight inspection.

Orion was a proposed ground-based laser broom project in the 1990s, estimated to cost $500 million.

A space-based laser also called "Project Orion" was planned to be installed on the International Space Station in 2003. In 2015, Japanese researchers proposed adding laser broom capabilities to the Extreme Universe Space Observatory telescope, to be launched to the ISS in 2017.

In 2014, the European CLEANSPACE project published a report studying a global architecture of debris tracking and removal laser stations.
