= Aircraft performance =

Aspect of aeronautical design and mission planning

Aircraft performance refers to the ability of airplanes and helicopters to accomplish certain useful things. It is an important consideration when designing and testing aircraft, to ensure the aircraft can be operated in an efficient and economic manner. There are typically trade-offs involved, for example an aircraft optimised for cruise performance will not necessarily be optimised for the climb. Adaptive compliant wings and variable-sweep wings are technologies aimed at improving performance during the different stages of flight.

The subject of aircraft performance includes aircraft speed, ceiling, range and fuel efficiency, take-off distance required, and climb rate. It also includes aircraft controllability speeds.

Aircraft manufacturers will publish performance data in an aircraft flight manual, concerning the behaviour of the aircraft under various circumstances, such as different speeds, weights, and air temperatures, pressures, & densities. Performance data is information pertaining to takeoff, climb, range, endurance, descent, and landing.

Aircraft performance is affected by atmospheric conditions. Climb performance will be reduced in hot and high conditions, as well as in humid conditions. Higher temperatures and humidities, and lower pressures reduce air density.

== See also ==
- Aircraft engine performance
- Jet engine performance
- Takeoff
- Landing
- Landing performance
- Ceiling (aeronautics)
- Flight envelope
- Hot and high
- Drag curve
- Wing loading
- V speeds
