= Beam-powered propulsion =

Mechanism where confined high-speed particles confer energy to a vehicle

Beam-powered propulsion, also known as directed energy propulsion, is a class of aircraft or spacecraft propulsion that uses energy beamed to the spacecraft from a remote power plant to provide energy. The beam is typically either a microwave or a laser beam, and it is either pulsed or continuous. A continuous beam lends itself to thermal rockets, photonic thrusters, and light sails. In contrast, a pulsed beam lends itself to ablative thrusters and pulse detonation engines.

The rule of thumb that is usually quoted is that it takes a megawatt of power beamed to a vehicle per kg of payload while it is being accelerated to permit it to reach low Earth orbit.

Other than launching to orbit, applications for moving around the world quickly have also been proposed.

== Background ==
Rockets are momentum machines; they use mass ejected from the rocket to provide momentum to the rocket. Momentum is the product of mass and velocity, so rockets generally attempt to put as much velocity into their working mass as possible, thereby minimizing the needed working mass. To accelerate the working mass, energy is required. In a conventional rocket, the fuel is chemically combined to provide the energy, and the resulting fuel products, the ash or exhaust, are used as the working mass.

There is no particular reason why the same fuel has to be used for both energy and momentum. In the jet engine, for instance, the fuel is used only to produce energy, and the air provides the working mass the jet aircraft flies through. In modern jet engines, the amount of air propelled is much more significant than the amount used for energy. However, this is not a solution for the rockets as they quickly climb to altitudes where the air is too thin to be useful as a source of working mass.

Rockets can carry their working mass and use other energy sources. The problem is finding an energy source with a power-to-weight ratio that competes with chemical fuels. Small nuclear reactors can compete in this regard, and considerable work on nuclear thermal propulsion was carried out in the 1960s, but environmental concerns and rising costs led to the ending of most of these programs.

Further improvement can be made by removing the energy created by the spacecraft. If the nuclear reactor is left on the ground and its energy is transmitted to the spacecraft, its weight is also removed. The issue then is getting the energy into the spacecraft. This is the idea behind beamed power.

With beamed propulsion, one can leave the power source stationary on the ground and directly (or via a heat exchanger) heat propellant on the spacecraft with a maser or a laser beam from a fixed installation. This permits the spacecraft to leave its power source at home, saving significant amounts of mass and greatly improving performance.

== Laser propulsion ==
Since a laser can heat propellant to extremely high temperatures, this potentially greatly improves the efficiency of a rocket, as exhaust velocity is proportional to the square root of the temperature. Normal chemical rockets have an exhaust speed limited by the fixed amount of energy in the propellants, but beamed propulsion systems have no particular theoretical limit (although, in practice, there are temperature limits).

== Microwave propulsion ==
In microwave thermal propulsion, an external microwave beam is used to heat a refractory heat exchanger to >1,500 K, heating a propellant such as hydrogen, methane, or ammonia. This improves the propulsion system's specific impulse and thrust/weight ratio relative to conventional rocket propulsion. For example, hydrogen can provide a specific impulse of 700–900 seconds and a thrust/weight ratio of 50-150.

A variation, developed by brothers James Benford and Gregory Benford, is to use thermal desorption of propellant trapped in the material of a massive microwave sail. This produces a very high acceleration compared to microwave-pushed sails alone.

== Electric propulsion ==
Some proposed spacecraft propulsion mechanisms use electrically powered spacecraft propulsion, in which electrical energy is used by an electrically powered rocket engine, such as an ion thruster or plasma propulsion engine. Usually, these schemes assume either solar panels or an onboard reactor. However, both power sources are heavy.

Beamed propulsion in the form of a laser can send power to a photovoltaic panel for Laser electric propulsion. In this system, if a high intensity is incident on the solar array, careful design of the panels is necessary to avoid a fall-off in conversion efficiency due to heating effects. John Brophy has analyzed the transmission of laser power to a photovoltaic array powering a high-efficiency electric propulsion system as a means of accomplishing high delta-V missions such as an interstellar precursor mission in a NASA Innovative Advanced Concepts project.

A microwave beam could be used to send power to a rectenna for microwave electric propulsion. Microwave broadcast power has been practically demonstrated several times (e.g., in Goldstone, California, in 1974). Rectennas are potentially lightweight and can handle high power at high conversion efficiency. However, rectennas must be huge for a significant amount of power to be captured.

== Direct impulse ==
A beam could also provide impulse by directly "pushing" on the sail.

One example is using a solar sail to reflect a laser beam. This concept, called a laser-pushed lightsail or laser sail, was initially proposed by G. Marx but first analyzed in detail, and elaborated on, by physicist Robert L. Forward in 1989 as a method of interstellar travel that would avoid extremely high mass ratios by not carrying fuel. Further analysis of the concept was done by Landis, Mallove and Matloff, Andrews Lubin, and others.

Forward proposed pushing a sail with a microwave beam in a later paper. This has the advantage that the sail need not be a continuous surface. Forward tagged his proposal for an ultralight sail "Starwisp". A later analysis by Landis suggested that the Starwisp concept as initially proposed by Forward would not work, but variations on the proposal might be implemented.

The beam has to have a large diameter so that only a small portion of the beam misses the sail due to diffraction, and the laser or microwave antenna has to have good pointing stability so that the craft can tilt its sails fast enough to follow the center of the beam. This gets more important when going from interplanetary travel to interstellar travel and when going from a fly-by mission to a landing mission to a return mission. The laser or the microwave sender would probably be a large phased array of small devices that get their energy directly from solar radiation. The size of the array negates the need for a lens or mirror.

Another beam-pushed concept would be to use a magnetic sail or MMPP sail to divert a beam of charged particles from a particle accelerator or plasma jet. Landis proposed a particle beam pushed sail in 1989, and analyzed in more detail in a 2004 paper. Jordin Kare has proposed a variant to this whereby a "beam" of small laser accelerated light sails would transfer momentum to a magsail vehicle.

=== Mass beam systems ===
Another beam-pushed concept uses pellets or projectiles of ordinary matter. A stream of pellets from a stationary mass-driver is "reflected" by the spacecraft, cf. mass driver. The spacecraft neither needs energy nor reaction mass for propulsion of its own. For craft at sub-relativistic velocities, mass beams would be more efficient than photon beams. Nordley and Crowl point out, "A photon must travel at the speed of light and until relativistic velocities are reached, a reflected photon carries away almost as much energy as it started with. A massive particle’s velocity, however, can be tuned so that the reflected mass is left almost dead in space relative to the beam generators, having surrendered almost all of its kinetic energy to the starship."

== Proposed systems ==
=== Lightcraft ===
A lightcraft is a vehicle currently under development that uses an external pulsed source of laser or maser energy to provide power for producing thrust.

The laser shines on a parabolic reflector on the vehicle's underside, concentrating the light to produce a region of extremely high temperature. The air in this region is heated and expands violently, producing thrust with each pulse of laser light. A lightcraft must provide this gas from onboard tanks or an ablative solid in space. By leaving the vehicle's power source on the ground and using the ambient atmosphere as reaction mass for much of its ascent, a lightcraft could deliver a substantial percentage of its launch mass to orbit. It could also potentially be very cheap to manufacture.

==== Testing ====
Early in the morning of 2 October 2000 at the High Energy Laser Systems Test Facility (HELSTF), Lightcraft Technologies, Inc. (LTI) with the help of Franklin B. Mead of the U.S. Air Force Research Laboratory and Leik Myrabo set a new world's altitude record of 233 feet (71 m) for its 4.8 inch (12.2 cm) diameter, 1.8-ounce (51 g), laser-boosted rocket in a flight lasting 12.7 seconds. Although much of the 8:35 am flight was spent hovering at 230+ feet, the Lightcraft earned a world record for the longest ever laser-powered free flight and the greatest "air time" (i.e., launch-to-landing/recovery) from a light-propelled object. This is comparable to Robert Goddard's first test flight of his rocket design. Increasing the laser power to 100 kilowatts will enable flights up to a 30-kilometer altitude. They aim to accelerate a one-kilogram microsatellite into low Earth orbit using a custom-built, one-megawatt ground-based laser. Such a system would use just about 20 dollars' worth of electricity, placing launch costs per kilogram to many times less than current launch costs (which are measured in thousands of dollars).

Myrabo's "lightcraft" design is a reflective funnel-shaped craft that channels heat from the laser toward the center, using a reflective parabolic surface, causing the laser to explode the air underneath it, generating lift. Reflective surfaces in the craft focus the beam into a ring, where it heats air to a temperature nearly five times hotter than the surface of the Sun, causing the air to expand explosively for thrust.

=== Laser thermal rocket ===
A laser thermal rocket is a thermal rocket in which the propellant is heated by energy provided by an external laser beam. In 1992, the late Jordin Kare proposed a simpler, nearer-term concept with a rocket containing liquid hydrogen. The propellant is heated in a heat exchanger that the laser beam shines on before leaving the vehicle via a conventional nozzle. This concept can use continuous beam lasers, and the semiconductor lasers are now cost-effective for this application.

=== Microwave thermal rocket ===
In 2002, Kevin L.G. Parkin proposed a similar system using microwaves. In May 2012, the DARPA/NASA Millimeter-wave Thermal Launch System (MTLS) Project began the first steps toward implementing this idea. The MTLS Project was the first to demonstrate a millimeter-wave absorbent refractory heat exchanger, subsequently integrating it into the propulsion system of a small rocket to produce the first millimeter-wave thermal rocket. Simultaneously, it developed the first high-power cooperative target millimeter-wave beam director and used it to attempt the first millimeter-wave thermal rocket launch. Several launches were attempted, but problems with the beam director could not be resolved before funding ran out in March 2014.

=== Mass-beam systems ===
Aerospace and mechanical engineer Artur Davoyan has been funded by NASA to study a pellet-beam system that would propel one ton payloads to 500 AU in under 20 years.

Nordley and Crowl propose vast solar arrays built by self-replicating robots placed at the Sun-Venus equilateral Lagrange points, capable of generating beams in the hundreds of petawatt range. With such technologies, craft could be driven to relativistic speeds, capable of reaching nearby stars in decades.

== Economics ==
The motivation to develop beam-powered propulsion systems comes from the economic advantages gained due to improved propulsion performance. In the case of beam-powered launch vehicles, better propulsion performance enables some combination of increased payload fraction, increased structural margins, and fewer stages. JASON's 1977 study of laser propulsion, authored by Freeman Dyson, succinctly articulates the promise of beam-powered launch:

Laser propulsion as an idea that may produce a revolution in space technology. A single laser facility on the ground can in theory launch single-stage vehicles into low or high earth orbit. The payload can be 20% or 30% of the vehicle take-off weight. It is far more economical in the use of mass and energy than chemical propulsion, and it is far more flexible in putting identical vehicles into a variety of orbits.

This promise was quantified in a 1978 Lockheed Study conducted for NASA:

The results of the study showed that, with advanced technology, laser rocket system with either a space- or ground-based laser transmitter could reduce the national budget allocated to space transportation by 10 to 345 billion dollars over a 10-year life cycle when compared to advanced chemical propulsion systems (LO_{2}–LH_{2}) of equal capability.

=== Beam-director cost ===
The 1970s-era studies and others since have cited beam-director cost as a possible impediment to beam-powered launch systems. A recent cost-benefit analysis estimates that microwave (or laser) thermal rockets would be economical once beam-director cost falls below 20 USD/W. The current cost of suitable lasers is <100 USD/W, and the cost of suitable microwave sources is <5 USD/W. Mass production has lowered the production cost of microwave oven magnetrons to <0.01 USD/W, and some medical lasers to <10 USD/W, though these are considered unsuitable for beam directors.

== Non-spacecraft applications ==
In 1964 William C. Brown demonstrated a miniature helicopter equipped with a combination antenna and rectifier device called a rectenna. The rectenna converted microwave power into electricity, allowing the helicopter to fly.

In 2002 a Japanese group propelled a tiny aluminium airplane by using a laser to vaporize a water droplet clinging to it, and in 2003 NASA researchers flew an 11-ounce (312 g) model airplane with a propeller powered with solar panels illuminated by a laser. It is possible that such beam-powered propulsion could be useful for long-duration high altitude uncrewed aircraft or balloons, perhaps designed to serve – like satellites do today – as communication relays, science platforms, or surveillance platforms.

A "laser broom" has been proposed to sweep space debris from Earth orbit. This is another proposed use of beam-powered propulsion, used on objects not designed to be propelled by it, for example, small pieces of scrap knocked off ("spalled") satellites. The technique works since the laser power ablates one side of the object, giving an impulse that changes the eccentricity of the object's orbit. The orbit would then intersect the atmosphere and burn up.

An interesting system using matched pulsed UV-C diodes and a VUV emitting tube (likely quartz backfilled with argon / deuterium and energized with HV) to modify the ion wind near the surface of an emitter wire powered by beamed energy to a lightweight polymer solar panel may be a useful workaround. A hybrid of 2003 NASA model aircraft and other advances notably the recent self sustained ion glider demonstrated by MIT, and at altitude atmospheric absorption reduces allowing an orbital satellite to 'take over' power thus permitting the device to enter LEO. An additional variant is to add the mass and solar panels of each 'uplifted' satellite to the main system using magnetic fixings as a way to build an orbital power plant with lower costs.

== See also ==
- Beam Power Challenge – one of the NASA Centennial Challenges
- MagBeam
- Thinned-array curse
- List of laser articles
- Project Forward (interstellar)
- DEEP-IN
