= British Rail flying saucer =

Proposed spacecraft design by British Rail

The British Rail flying saucer, officially known simply as space vehicle, was a proposed interplanetary spacecraft designed by Charles Osmond Frederick. Although the proposed craft required controlled thermonuclear fusion and other futuristic technologies, a patent application was filed on behalf of British Rail in December 1970 and granted on 21 March 1973.

== Purpose ==
The flying saucer originally started as a proposal for a lifting platform. However, the project was revised and edited, and by the time the patent was filed had become a large passenger craft for interplanetary travel.

== Design ==
The craft was to be powered by nuclear fusion, using laser beams to produce pulses of nuclear energy in a generator in the centre of the craft, at a rate of over 1,000 Hz to prevent resonance, which could damage the vehicle. The pulses of energy would then have been transferred out of a nozzle into a series of radial electrodes running along the underside of the craft, which would have converted the energy into electricity that would then pass into a ring of powerful electromagnets (the patent describes using superconductors if possible). These magnets would accelerate subatomic particles emitted by the fusion reaction, providing lift and thrust. This general design was used in several fusion rocket studies.

A layer of thick metal running above the fusion reactor would have acted as a shield to protect the passengers above from the radiation emitted from the core of the reactor. The entire vehicle would be piloted in such a way that the acceleration and deceleration of the craft would have simulated gravity in zero gravity conditions.

A patent application was filed by Jensen and Son on behalf of British Rail on 11 December 1970 and granted on 21 March 1973.

The patent lapsed in 1976 due to non-payment of renewal fees.

== Media attention ==
The patent first came to the attention of the media in an article in The Guardian on 31 May 1978 by Adrian Hope of the New Scientist magazine. There was a further mention in The Daily Telegraph on 11 July 1982, during the silly season. The Railway Magazine mentioned it in its May 1996 issue, saying that the passengers would have been "fried" anyway.

When the patent was rediscovered in 2006, it gained widespread publicity in the British press. A group of nuclear scientists examined the designs and declared them to be unworkable, expensive and very inefficient. Michel van Baal of the European Space Agency claimed "I have had a look at the plans, and they don't look very serious to me at all", adding that many of the technologies used in the craft, such as nuclear fusion and high temperature superconductors, had not yet been discovered, while Colin Pillinger, the scientist in charge of the Beagle 2 probe, was quoted as saying "If I hadn't seen the documents I wouldn't have believed it".
