= Lightcraft =

Aerospace craft utilizing beam-powered propulsion

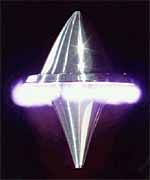
Lightcraft being propelled by laser

A Lightcraft is a space- or air-vehicle driven by beam-powered propulsion, the energy source powering the craft being external. It was conceptualized by aerospace engineering professor Leik Myrabo at Rensselaer Polytechnic Institute in 1976, who developed the concept further with working prototypes, funded in the 1980s by the Strategic Defense Initiative organization, and the decade after by the Advanced Concept Division of the US Air Force AFRL, NASA's MFSC and the Lawrence Livermore National Laboratory.

When a Lightcraft is in the atmosphere, air is used as the propellant material (reaction mass). In space, it would need to provide the propellant material from onboard tanks or from an ablative solid. By leaving the vehicle's power source on the ground and by using ambient atmosphere as a reaction mass for much of its ascent, a Lightcraft could potentially be capable of delivering a very large percentage of its launch mass to orbit as an SSTO, a difficult task for chemical rockets. As such, a Lightcraft is distinct from a solar sail because it is dependent on the expansion of reaction mass to accelerate rather than being accelerated by light pressure alone. Within the atmosphere, the Lightcraft propulsion is dependent on the external laser power only, so propulsive power is not limited to that generated by usual on-board machinery (i.e. rockets).

== Types ==
=== Laser-powered propulsion ===
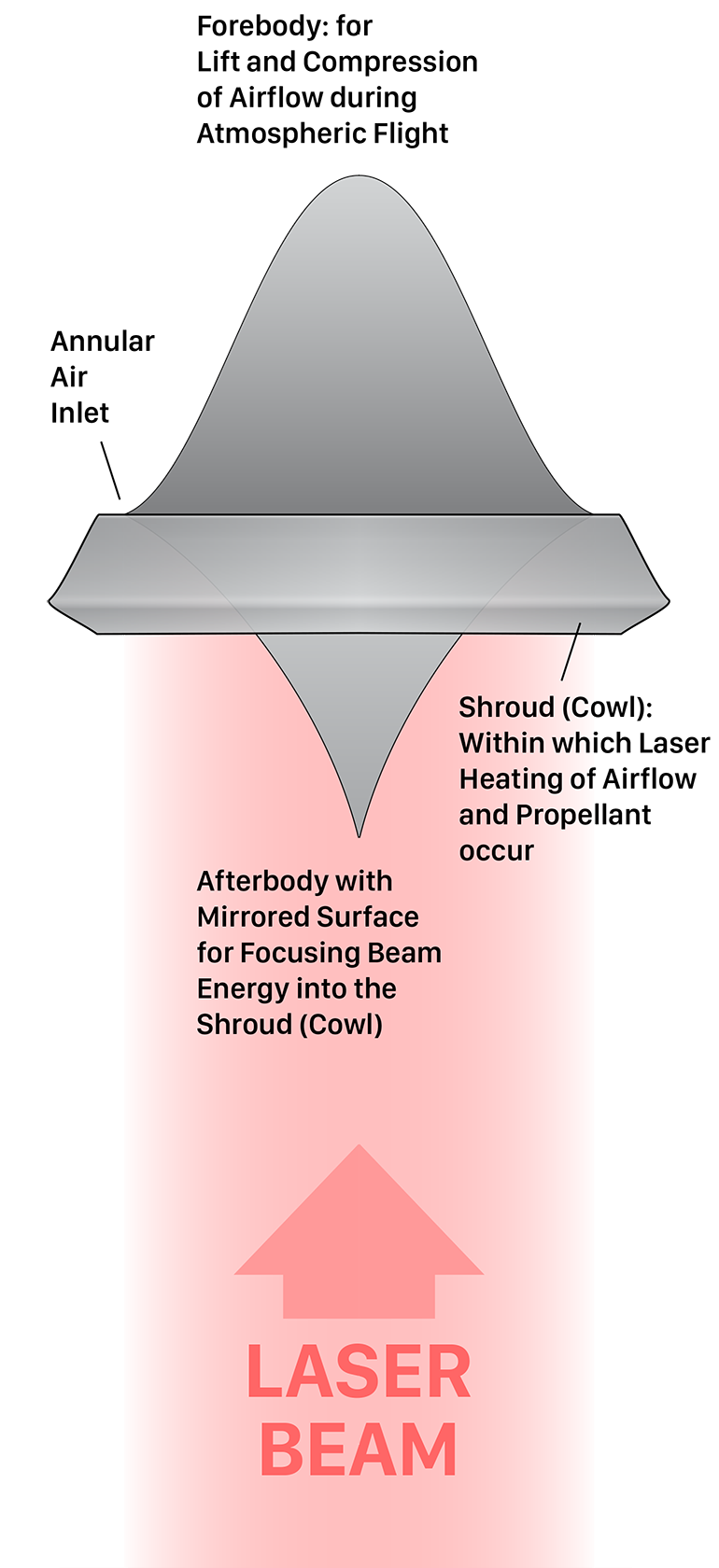
Profile view of a laser Lightcraft type 200

First small-scale models used laser propulsion which is a technique still in early stages of development. Lightcraft prototypes are made of solid aluminium machined axisymmetrically. The nose is shaped as a blunted cone for aerodynamical purpose. The rim has an annular air inlet. The aft is a funnel polished as a concave mirror with a pointed tail in the middle extending back out of the body, acting as a parabolic reflector.

A ground-based laser aims a high power pulse to the mirror stern. The beam is reflected and focuses to heat the air at an extremely high temperature up to 30,000 degrees, transforming it in a plasma that violently expands, pushing the craft forward. Air is renewed through the inlet and the cycle is repeated at high frequency, acting as an external pulse detonation engine producing thrust.

In April 1997, tests by Leik Myrabo in cooperation with the US Army at White Sands Missile Range demonstrated the basic feasibility to propel objects in this way, using a 10-kW ground-based pulsed carbon dioxide laser (1 kJ per pulse, 30 μs pulse at 10 Hz frequency). The test succeeded in reaching over one hundred feet, which compares to Robert Goddard's first test flight of his rocket design.

In October 2000, a new flight record was set with a flight lasting 10.5 seconds and reaching 71 meters (233 feet) using the same laser, but this time providing an on-board plastic ablative propellant, and rotating the body around its axis at high speed (over 10,000 rpm) to stabilize the craft with a gyroscopic effect.

Lightcraft use a type of beam-powered propulsion.

=== Microwave-powered and MHD propulsion ===
More advanced concepts of the Lightcraft replace the laser pulses by a microwave beam or maser that can still be ground-based, or alternatively put into orbit, the beams being emitted from above the ascending craft by a series of space-based solar power satellites that could more easily keep track of the Lightcraft along its curved ballistic trajectory.

The microwave beam detonates the air below the craft exactly like the laser version, but some energy from the beam is also diverted and converted on board by high-power rectennas into electricity to power an external-flow airbreathing MHD drive called by Myrabo an MHD slipstream accelerator.

As an MHD accelerator works only with an electrically conductive medium, some of the incoming microwaves are also diverted within the Lightcraft through a series of transparent windows and mirror sections, then re-emitted in the air near the electrodes of the MHD accelerators located around the rim. The air becomes ionized in these places, allowing MHD interaction of Lorentz forces to actively control the airflow around a discoidal shape that otherwise (i.e. passively) has very bad aerodynamical properties due to its largest surface, a flat plate, being perpendicular to the flow.

Finally, a laser or some part of the microwaves are also focused as a plasma torch at some distance above the Lightcraft, creating an aerospike that detaches and mitigates the bow shock wave ahead of the craft when it evolves at supersonic speeds, lowering heat transfert to the walls. The distance and intensity of the aerospike are tuned according to the atmospheric pressure, temperature gradients and velocity of the airflow to actively shape the shock wave so the boundary layer can be optimally controlled by the radial MHD slipstream accelerators.

The Lightcraft concept thus combines magnetohydrodynamic active flow control and beam-powered propulsion mechanisms to enable hypersonic flight, solving the classical problem of aerial MHD propulsion (i.e. lack of a light power source offering enough energy to feed such systems) by outsourcing the power source. Using microwaves instead of a laser allows four combined actions: propulsive detonation, shockwave mitigation, ionization control and electrical feeding of MHD drives.

== Status ==
In 2008, the Office of Scientific and Technical Information of the US Department of Energy published an article on the official website in which its author William Larson talks about successfully completed research in this area.

After Leik Myrabo's retirement from Rensselaer Polytechnic Institute in 2011, the homepage of his private company Lightcraft Technologies, Inc. (LTI) disappeared with a temporary notification explaining that a "site renovation" was ongoing. The old LTI logo and the small-scale model of the laser Lightcraft prototype of the 1990s were swapped for the occasion with a new logo and an artist image showing a full-scale lenticular microwave-powered Lightcraft with active peripheral MHD slipstream accelerators in orbit above the Earth. This plasma thruster image is shown on the cover of Myrabo's book about the Lightcraft.

That presaged new developments but the site went eventually completely offline and never reappeared since. At that time though, laser aerospike and PDE testing continued in the hypersonic wind tunnel of the Laboratory of Hypersonics and Aerothermodynamics at the Department of Aerospace Science and Technology of the Brazilian Air Force in São José dos Campos.

== See also ==
- Beam-powered propulsion
- Magnetohydrodynamic drive
- Elevator:2010
- Non-rocket spacelaunch
- List of laser articles
