= White Sands Test Center =

Coordinates: 32.505669°N 106.611363°W

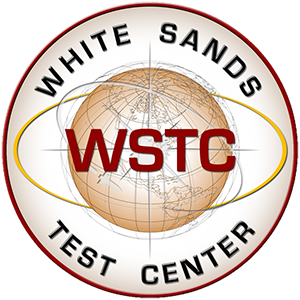

The White Sands Test Center (WSTC) was responsible for planning and conducting tests at White Sands Missile Range (WSMR), New Mexico, USA. WSTC reported to the United States Army Test and Evaluation Command (ATEC). Now under the control of the WSMR, WSTC was designated as an activity within the Department of Defense (DoD) Major Range and Test Facility Base (MRTFB), a core set of DoD Test and Evaluation (T&E) infrastructure and workforce preserved as a national asset to support the DoD acquisition system. The Range possesses capabilities and infrastructure utilized by the US Army, Navy, Air Force and other government agencies as well as universities, private industry, and foreign militaries. As a tri-service facility (Army, Navy, and Air Force), WSTC supported the Army by providing data collection and analysis, instrumentation development, modeling and simulation, research assessment, and technical services.

The US Army White Sands Test Center was overseen by an O-6 level officer and reported to the Commanding General of White Sands Missile Range.

== Operations ==
WSTC, now WSMR, is divided into six directorates: Army Air Operations; Range Operations Directorate; Materiel Testing Directorate; Survivability, Vulnerability, and Assessment Directorate; Information Management Directorate; and Systems Engineering Directorate.

=== Army air operations ===
Army Air Operation's fleet is used for search and recovery. Their aircraft are instrumented with sensors, payloads, and cameras to support data collection.

=== Range operations ===
Range Operations Directorate establishes and implements policies, programs, and procedures, coordinates range operations and data measurements and has complete flight safety control for all missiles, rockets, munitions and other devices launched from or into WSMR, or which pass through WSMR airspace.

=== Material Test Operations ===
The Material Test Directorate provides evaluation of systems, materiel and equipment through field and laboratory testing and sponsors testing for Department of Defense (DoD), foreign, space and industry customers. Some of the systems they have tested include: Stinger, Terminal High Altitude Area Defense (THAAD), Patriot, Multiple Launch Rocket System (MLRS), High Mobility Artillery Rocket System (HIMARS), Army Tactical Missile System (ATACMS), and a variety of Unmanned Aerial Systems (UAS). In addition, they tested the Future Combat System (FCS), a highly integrated structure of manned and unmanned, air and ground assets connected by a distributed network that allows it to act as a unified combat force.

=== Survivability, vulnerability, and assessment operations ===
The Survivability, Vulnerability, and Assessment Directorate (SVAD) performs nuclear weapons effects testing and evaluation. They simulate thermal radiation from nuclear weapon detonations, provide high-energy pulsed field-emission electron beams, and simulate high intensity gamma spikes along with total gamma dose and residual gamma dose environments. In addition, they employ the Fast Burst Reactor to simulate a neutron radiation environment like that of a fission weapon. They also house the largest pulsed CO_{2} laser in the United States, used for providing tactical threat environments for weapons systems. Their other facilities produce electromagnetic environmental effects, lightning strike characteristics, and semi-conductor characterizations. SVAD also operates the High Energy Laser System Test Facility (HELSTF) designed to support high energy laser technology programs.

=== Information management operations ===
The Information Management Directorate manages and operates the information and communications resources at White Sands Missile Range. They are responsible for processing raw mission data that has been collected, providing distributed test network support, overseeing off-Range safari of instrumentation, and providing imaging and media production services . In addition, they manage telecommunication tasks and implement Army assurance programs.

=== Systems engineering operations ===
The Systems Engineering Directorate develops data collection instrumentation and associated technology. They conduct planning, concept formulation, research and development, and systems engineering, development, integration and acquisition, along with field testing and life cycle support used for testing and evaluation of weapons systems. The instrumentation they have developed is used in support of many functional areas including radar, telemetry, and optical support; graphical displays, directed energy, data processing, storage and transmission; networks, control systems and counter Improvised Explosive devices (IED).
