= Bernard J. Dunn =

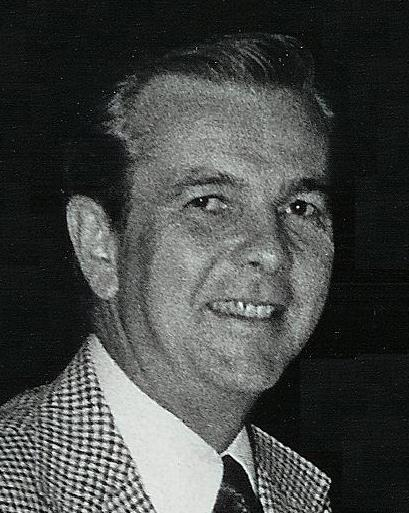
Bernard J. Dunn

Bernard Joseph Dunn (May 26, 1924 – March 14, 2009) was a noted Washington, D.C. area scientist, entrepreneur, and philanthropist. He cofounded Braddock Dunn & McDonald (later BDM International) with fellow Fordham University professors in 1959, and served as Chairman of the Board and Chief Scientist.

== Biography ==
Dunn was born in the Bronx, New York City. He enrolled in Fordham University but left to volunteer during World War II and was commissioned a 2nd Lieutenant in the Army Air Forces. He served as a bombardier aboard a B-24 for the 23rd Squadron, 5th Bomb Group, based on the Philippine island of Samar. On July 4, 1945, he survived the crash and complete destruction of a C-46 transport airplane on Biak Island in Indonesia (at the time part of New Guinea). For his combat service he was awarded the American Theater Ribbon, the Asiatic Pacific Theater Ribbon with 2 stars, and the Philippine Liberation Ribbon, Victory Medal.

He graduated from Fordham in 1947 and received a master's degree in physics from Columbia University in 1949. He returned to Fordham under the mentorship of Austrian physicist and Nobel laureate Victor Hess, the discoverer of cosmic rays, where he taught for ten years. He received his doctorate in physics in 1958.

In 1959 he left Fordham to form BDM with Daniel F. McDonald and Joseph V. Braddock. Working at the U.S. Army Air Defense Center at Fort Bliss, Texas, and White Sands Missile Range, Dr. Dunn played a major role in the development of anti-ballistic missile technology, tested related weapons systems such as MIM-14 Nike-Hercules, and studied the effect of large electromagnetic fields on U.S. aircraft and missiles. His Army clients nicknamed him "The Man Who Saved Indianapolis" thanks to his innovation of a method (until then considered impossible) to distribute anti-ballistic missile interceptors to protect smaller urban centers, such as Indianapolis, as well as major population centers such as New York or Chicago.

The firm relocated from El Paso, Texas to Tysons Corner, Virginia, in the early 1970s and became a highly successful business. BDM evolved into BDM International, Inc., a multinational information technology company that operated in three interrelated markets: systems and software integration, computer and technical services, and enterprise management and operations. The company served the Department of Defense, international defense agencies, civil government agencies and commercial clients.

After retirement, Dr. Dunn was active in philanthropic and charitable causes in Northern Virginia, including his $10 million endowment to found the Bernard J. Dunn School of Pharmacy at Shenandoah University in Winchester, Virginia, which was named for his father, a Manhattan pharmacist who died when Dr. Dunn was nine years old.

Dr. Dunn also established the Bernard J. Dunn Eminent Scholars Endowment in Information Technology at George Mason University, and was a supporter of Loudoun Hospital, the Loudoun County Symphony, the Make-a-Wish Foundation, and Notre Dame Academy (Middleburg, Virginia). With his former business partners, he helped create the Potomac Foundation think tank. He was also a member of Sigma Xi, the scientific research society, the American Physical Society, and St. John Neumann Catholic Community in Reston. He is survived by his wife of 56 years, four children, and seven grandchildren.
