= Mid-Atlantic Women's Hockey League =

American amateur ice hockey league

The Mid-Atlantic Women's Hockey League (MAWHL) is the oldest continuously active women's ice hockey league in North America. The MAWHL is a senior amateur league under the oversight of USA Hockey. It is based in the United States and has two divisions allowing for different levels of play. The league has players with a wide array of experience, ranging from athletes who have competed at the high school level to those who have spent time on the United States women's national ice hockey team.

== History ==
The MAWHL was begun in 1975–76 with only three teams. The Delaware Bobcats, the Boulevard Hookers and the University of Pennsylvania's club team. In the 1976–77 season, the Philadelphia Ice-Centennials joined the MAWHL.

During the summer of 1977, the increased popularity of ice hockey sparked the birth of the Mid-Atlantic Women's Ice Hockey League. It consisted of nine teams at the start of the 1977–78 season. The newcomers included: the Bergen Blades A team and B team, the Ironbound Bandits, the Pittsburgh Pennies, and the Philadelphia Ice-Centennials B team.

At the beginning of the 1978–79 season, the Budweiser Redcoats, and the Green Machine Eagles from Long Island, New York joined our league. Unfortunately the Pittsburgh Pennies, and the Bergen Blades B team dropped out. With these changes MAWHL now had a nine-team league divided into North and South regional divisions. At the start of the 1979–80 season our league started with eight teams: Four in the both divisions. At the start of the 1980–81 season, only six teams remained in the league. Gradually even that number diminished to four with the losses of the Bergen Blades in 1981, and the then Long Island Eagles in 1986

As of 2025, the MAWHL is an affiliate of the Atlantic Amateur Hockey Hockey Association, which also operates the Mid-Atlantic Women's Hockey Association.

== 2025–26 Teams ==
=== Senior B Division (no longer part of MAWHL) ===
There is no Senior B division in MAWHL as of October 2025.

=== Senior C Division ===
- Annapolis Osprey
- Charm City Crush (2024 to Present)
- Chesapeake Bay Lightning (1997–1998 to 2001–2002 and 2010 to Present)
- District Renegades (2016-2017 to Present)
- Tri-City Trash Pandas (2022 to Present
- Washington Wolves (1997–1998 to Present)

=== Senior D Division ===
- Angry Beavers (2024–Present)
- Annapolis Osprey
- Ashburn Alley Cats
- Baltimore Blizzard (2000–2001 to Present)
- Chesapeake Bay Lightning (2010 to Present)
- District Renegades (2025–Present)
- Frederick Firestorm (2002 to Present)
- Washington Wolves (2000–2001 to Present)

== Former Teams ==
- Baltimore Blizzard (2000-2015, Senior C Division)
- Pittsburgh Puffins (2014-2015, Senior D Division)
- Reading Reign (2010–2015, Senior D Division)
- Prince William Wildcats (2006–2015, Senior D Division)
- Hagerstown Mayhem (2013-2015, Senior D Division)
- Rooftop Rebels (2010-2024, Senior C Division)
- Philadelphia Voodoo (2013-2015, Senior C Division)
- Bergen Blades (2014-2015, Senior B Division, no long part of MAWHL)
- Boulevard Hookers (2014-2015, Senior B Division, no long part of MAWHL)
- Jersey City Recreational (2014-2015, Senior B Division, no long part of MAWHL)
- Long Island Eagles (2014-2015, Senior B Division, no long part of MAWHL)
- Long Island Hurricanes (2014-2015, Senior B Division, no long part of MAWHL)
- New Jersey Selects (2014-2015, Senior B Division, no long part of MAWHL)
- New York Raiders (2007–2008 to 2015, Senior B Division, no long part of MAWHL)
- Old York Roadrunners (2014-2015, Senior B Division, no long part of MAWHL)
- Ironbound Bandits (2014-2015, Senior B Division, no long part of MAWHL)
- Philadelphia Ice Centennials (2014-2015, Senior B Division, no long part of MAWHL)
- Philadelphia Roadrunners (2014-2015, Senior B Division, no long part of MAWHL)
- Pittsburgh Pennies (2014-2015, Senior B Division, no long part of MAWHL)
- University of Penn (2014-2015, Senior B Division, no long part of MAWHL)
- American University Eagles (2001–2002), in level Senior D Division.
- Bridgewater Wings (2000–2001 to 2005–2006), in level Senior B Division.
- Central Penn Blades - 2 teams: (1999–2000 & 2004–2005), in level Senior C Division, (2000–2001 to 2003–2004 ) in level Senior D Division.
- Chesapeake Bay Lightning (2008–2009) in level Senior B Division.
- Columbia Panthers (2006–2007) in level Senior D Division.
- Concord Flames (1999–2000 to 2008–2009) in level Senior C Division
- Delaware Bobcats - 3 teams: (1975–1976 to 2000–2001) in level Senior B Division, (1998–1999 to 2006–2007) in level Senior C Division, (2000–2001 to 2006–2007) in level Senior D Division.
- Delaware Phoenix (2001–2002 to 2006–2007) in level Senior C division.
- Floyd Hall Arena Quarry Cats (1999–2000 and 2006–2007 to 2009–2010) in level Senior C Division.
- Harrisburg Rockettes (1997–1998) in level Senior C Division.
- Hollydell Hurricanes - 2 teams (2002–2003 to 2004–2005) in level Senior B Division, (2002–2003 to 2004–2005) in level Senior C Division.
- Lehigh Valley Wicked (2005–2006) in level Senior C Division
- Philadelphia Freeze (1997–1998 to 2007–2008) in Level Senior C Division
- Prince William Wildcats (2005–2006) in Level Senior C Division
- Quakers Hockey Club - 2 teams: (2005–2006) in level Senior B Division,( 2007–2008 to 2007–2008) in level Senior C Division.
- Queenston Hockey Club (? to 2003–2004) in level Senior B Division.
- Reading Reign (? to 2013/14) in level Senior C Division.
- Richmond Raptors (2007–2008 to 2007–2008) in level Senior D Division.
- South Jersey Grizzlies (1997–1998 to 2001–2002) in level Senior C Division.
- University of Maryland Terps - 2 teams: (1998–1999 to 2000–2001) in level Senior C & D Divisions.
- Washington Redcoats (1976–1977 to 1993–1994) in level Senior B Division.
- Washington Wolves (1994–1995 to 2004–2005) in level Senior B Division

== Championship ==
=== Senior B Division Champions ===
Year	Playoff champion	Regular season champion	Games record
2010–11	No playoffs held.	Philadelphia Freeze	4-0-0
2009–10	No playoffs held.	East Coast Raiders	2-1-1
2008–09	East Coast Raiders	East Coast Raiders	6-2-0
2007–08	East Coast Raiders	East Coast Raiders	6-1-1
2006–07	Philadelphia Freeze	Philadelphia Freeze	3-0-1
2005–06	Philadelphia Freeze	Philadelphia Freeze	9-1-2
2004–05	Bridgewater Wings	Bridgewater Wings	14-2-0
2003–04	Queenston Hockey Club	Queenston Hockey Club	12-1-2
2002–03	Chesapeake Bay Lightning	Chesapeake Bay Lightning	11-2-2
2001–02	Bridgewater Wings	Bridgewater Wings	7-2-3
2000–01	Philadelphia Freeze	Long Island Hurricanes	10-1-1
1999–00	New Jersey Selects	Long Island Hurricanes (North Division)+ Chesapeake Bay Lightning	7-1-0 and 9-1-0
1998–99	Long Island Hurricanes	Long Island Hurricanes	16-2-0
1997–98	New Jersey Selects	Long Island Hurricanes	15-2-1
1996–97	New Jersey Selects	New Jersey Bandits	12-0-0
1995–96	Delaware Bobcats	Delaware Bobcats	9-1-5
1994–95	Washington Wolves	Washington Wolves	11-3-2
1993–94	Washington Redcoats	Washington Redcoats	9-0-3
1992–93	Washington Redcoats	Washington Redcoats	7-1-2
1991–92	Ironbound Bandits	Ironbound Bandits	10-1-1
1990–91	Washington Redcoats	Ironbound Bandits	N/A
1989–90	Ironbound Bandits	Washington Redcoats	9-1-2
1988–89	Ironbound Bandits	Washington Redcoats	7-3-2
1987–88	Washington Redcoats	Ironbound Bandits	9-1-2
1986–87	Philadelphia Roadrunners	Ironbound Bandits	8-2-2
1985–86	Long Island Green Machine Eagles	Long Island Green Machine Eagles	N/A
1984–85	Delaware Bobcats	Delaware Bobcats	13-3-0
1983–84	Long Island Green Machine Eagles	Long Island Green Machine Eagles	13-0-2
1982–83	Washington Redcoats	Delaware Bobcats	12-1-3
1981–82	Delaware Bobcats	Delaware Bobcats	16-0-0
1980–81	Delaware Bobcats	Bergen Blades	12-1-1
1979–80	Delaware Bobcats (tie) Bergen Blades	Bergen Blades (North Division), Washington Redcoats (South Division)	12-0-0 and 8-2-2
1978–79	Bergen Blades	Bergen Blades (North Division), Delaware Bobcats (South Division)	11-0-0 and 10-2-2
1977–78	Bergen Blades (Division I), Ironbound (Division II)	Bergen Blades (Division I), Ironbound (Division II)	7-0-1 and 9-0-1
1976–77	No Playoffs	Delaware Bobcats (tie) Philadelphia Ice-Centennials	5-1-0 and 5-1-0
1975–76	No playoffs	Delaware Bobcats	9-1-0

=== Senior C Division Champions ===
Year	Playoff champion	Regular season champion	Games RECORD
2024-25	District Renegades	District Renegades	N/A
2023-24	District Renegades	District Renegades	N/A
2022-23	District Renegades	District Renegades	N/A
2021-22	Annapolis Osprey	Annapolis Osprey	N/A
2020-21	Annapolis Osprey	Annapolis Osprey	N/A
2019-20	Annapolis Osprey	Annapolis Osprey	N/A
2018-19	Annapolis Osprey	Annapolis Osprey	N/A
2017-18	Annapolis Osprey	Annapolis Osprey	N/A
2010–11	No playoffs held.	Baltimore Blizzard	6-2-1
2009–10	Bridgewater Wings	Chesapeake Bay Lightning	N/A
2008–09	Bridgewater Wings	Tampa Bay Elite	N/A
2007–08	Concord Flames	Tampa Bay Elite	N/A
2006–07	Concord Flames	Tampa Bay Elite	M/A
2005–06	Concord Flames	Tampa Bay Elite	N/A
2004–05	Delaware Phoenix	Atlanta Lady Thrashers	N/A
2003–04	Delaware Phoenix	Prince William Wildcats	N/A

=== Senior D Division Champions ===
Year	PLAYOFF CHAMPION	REGULAR SEASON CHAMPION	RECORD
2014–15	Chesapeake Bay Lightning	Chesapeake Bay Lightning	11-2-1
2013–14	Chesapeake Bay Lightning	Chesapeake Bay Lightning	10-1-1
2012–13	Prince William Wildcats	---	---
2011–12	Baltimore Blizzard	Prince William Wildcats	4-0-0
2010–11	No playoffs held.	Prince William Wildcats	5-1-3
2009–10	Frederick Firestorm	Frederick Firestorm	9-0-3
2008–09	Frederick Firestorm	Frederick Firestorm	12-0-0
2007–08	Frederick Firestorm	Richmond Raptors	9-1-1
2006–07	Frederick Firestorm	Frederick Firestorm	11-2-2
2005–06	Baltimore Blizzard	Baltimore Blizzard	10-0-2
2004–05	Frederick Firestorm	Delaware Bobcats	5-3-4
2003–04	Frederick Firestorm	Central Penn Blades	14-1-1
2002–03	Frederick Firestorm	Central Penn Blades	9-3-0
2001–02	Washington Wolves	Baltimore Blizzard	9-2-1
2000–01	Central Penn Blades	Central Penn Blades	12-0-0

== Scoring champions ==
=== Senior B Division Leading Scorer ===
Year	Player	Team	Goals	Assists	Points
2010–11					
2009–10	Amy Reich	Philadelphia Freeze	4	4	8
2008–09	Amy Reich	Philadelphia Freeze	15	2	17
2007–08	Lisa Cervo	Philadelphia Freeze	5	8	13
2006–07	Christine Hurlock	Philadelphia Freeze	6	2	8
2005–06	Jane Chamberlain	Bridgewater Wings	8	7	15
2004–05	Christine Hurlock	Philadelphia Freeze	12	9	21
2003–04	Sarah Smith	Queenston Hockey Club	13	11	24
2002–03	Jodi Bracco	Queenston Hockey Club	15	13	28
2001–02	Rachel Rochat	Chesapeake Bay Lightning	15	6	21
2000–01	Rachel Rochat (tie) Wendy Peace	Chesapeake Bay Lightning - Long Island Hurricanes	Rachel Rochat 15, Wendy Peace 13	Rachel Rochat 6, Wendy Peace 8	Rachel Rochat 21, Wendy Peace 21
1999–00	Jodi Bard (North Division),	Long Island Hurricanes -	11	6	17
1999–00	Vicki Urbas (South Division ) tie Nancy Baier (South Division )	Chesapeake Bay Lightning - Chesapeake Bay Lightning	Vicki Urbas 11, Nancy Baier 10	Vicki Urbas 7, Nancy Baier 8	Vicki Urbas 18, Nancy Baier 18
1998–99	Michele Seltzer	New Jersey Selects	19	14	33
1997–98	Mollie Marcoux	New Jersey Selects	32	27	59
1996–97	Mary Lou Deutsch	New Jersey Bandits	26	10	36
1995–96	Liz Hall	Washington Wolves	29	12	41
1994–95	Mary Lou Deutsch	New Jersey Bandits	33	6	39
1993–94	Mary Lou Deutsch	Ironbound Bandits	29	7	36
1992–93	Mary Lou Deutsch	Ironbound Bandits	20	6	26
1991–92	Karen Harty	Ironbound Bandits	19	14	33
1990–91	Karen Harty	Ironbound Bandits	N/A	N/A	M/A
1989–90	Nancy Smalley (tie) Mary Lou Deutsch	Washington Redcoats - Ironbound Bandits	Nancy Smalley 10, M.L. Deutsch 19	Nancy Smalley 14, M.L. Deutsch 5	Nancy Smalley 24, M.L. Deutsch 24
1988–89	Mary Lou Deutsch	Ironbound Bandits	18	7	25
1987–88	Karen Harty	Ironbound Bandits	14	14	28
1986–87	Karen Harty	Ironbound Bandits	24	14	38
1985–86	Denise Smith	Long Island Green Machine Eagles - Philadelphia Roadrunners	M.L. Deutsch 27, Denise Smith 15	M.L. Deutsch 11, Denise Smith 23	M.L. Deutsch 38, Denise Smith 38
1984–85	Mary Lou Deutsch	Long Island Green Machine Eagles	36	15	51
1983–84	Mary Lou Deutsch	Long Island Green Machine Eagles	34	16	50
1982–83	BC Biesinger	Delaware Bobcats	15	10	25
1981–82	Lynn Gathercole	Delaware Bobcats	24	24	48
1980–81	Lynn Gathercole	Delaware Bobcats	34	18	52
1979–80	Mary Lou Deutsch (North Div) (tie) Shelia Guinee (North Div) (tie) Lynn Gathercole(South Division)	Long Island Green Machine Eagles - Bergen Blades - Delaware Bobcats	Deutsch 23, Guinee 14, Gathercole 20	Deutsch 3, Guinee 12, Gathercole 17	Deutsch 26, Guinee 26, Gathercole 37
1978–79	Lynn Gathercole	Delaware Bobcats	34	9	43
1977–78	Karen Harty (Division I) (tie) BC Biesinger (Division II)	Bergen Blades - Delaware Bobcats	Harty N/A, Biesinger 13	Harty N/A, Biesinger 9	Harty N/A, Biesinger 22
1976–77	Barb Horton	Delaware Bobcats	13	6	19
1975–76	Sylvia Wasylyk	Delaware Bobcats	21	5	26

=== Senior C Division Leading Scorer ===
Year	Player	Team	Goals	Assists	Points
2010–11					
2009–10					
2008–09	Kathryn Vaughan	Concord Flames	32	10	42
2007–08	Anne Ensor	Baltimore Blizzard	16	14	30
2006–07	MaryLou Deutsch	Floyd Hall Arena QuarryCats	22	15	37
2005–06	Erin Moran	Delaware Bobcats	35	6	41
2004–05	Erin Moran	Delaware Bobcats	16	5	21
2003–04	BC Biesinger	Delaware Phoenix	12	11	23
2002–03	BC Biesinger	Delaware Phoenix	11	10	21
2001–02	Renee Peplowski (tie) Janelle Hinchliffe	South Jersey Grizzlies - South Jersey Grizzlies	Peplowski 18, Hinchliffe 13	Peplowski 9, Hinchliffe 14	Peplowski 27, Hinchliffe 27
1999–00	Nina Fleming	U of MD Terrapins	22	16	38
1998–99	Arlene Zizza	South Jersey Grizzlies	5	7	12
1997–98	Kim Siegfried	Harrisburg Rockettes	11	9	20

=== Senior D Division Leading Scorer ===
Year	Player	Team	Goals	Assists	Points
2010–11					
2009–10					
2008–09	Rita Grantner	Frederick Firestorm	10	7	17
2007–08	Missy Ackerman	Richmond Raptors	13	6	19
2006–07	Bonnie Rothen	Frederick Firestorm	16	12	28
2005–06	Leigh Garbowski (tie) Sabrina Must	Washington Wolves - Baltimore Blizzard	Garbowski 10, Must 7	Garbowski 4, Must 7	Garbowski 14, Must 14
2004–05	Leigh Garbowski	Washington Wolves	10	8	18
2003–04	Carole Galligan	Frederick Firestorm	N/A	N/A	N/A
2002–03	Carole Galligan	Frederick Firestorm	16	10	26
2001–02	Lauren McFoy	Delaware Bobcats	10	8	18
2000–01	Wanda Underkoffler	Central Penn Blades	19	16	35

== MAWHL Staff 2026-2027 ==
- Commissioner - Abbey Dufoe
- President - Brit Marien
- Vice President (division C) - Katherine Chewning
- Vice President (division D) - Melissa Kuyumjian
- Treasurer - Emily Summers
- Secretary - Danny Swaim
- Statistician - Devon Strachan
- Controller: Emily Hughes
