= Charles Osmond Frederick =

British engineer

Charles Osmond Frederick is a British engineer who worked on interaction of rails and wheels at the British Railway Technical Centre, Derby.

Together with P.J. Armstrong he developed the Armstrong-Frederick plasticity models, which are applied in the theory of inelastic deformations. In the early 60's, he investigated stress phenomena in nuclear fuel elements for the UK Atomic Energy Authority. Since around 1970, he was employed by the research centre of British Rail.

In 2006, patent-spotters rediscovered a patent attributed in 1973 to the British Railways Board on a nuclear driven space vehicle, dubbed the British Rail flying saucer. The patent was based on work performed by Frederick, which originally was directed towards a lifting platform and finally culminated in a nuclear fusion powered passenger craft for interplanetary travel.

== Publications ==
- C.O. Frederick and J.D. Waters: Bowing behaviour of experimental fuel elements in the Windscale AGR, Report to United Kingdom Atomic Energy Authority; 1963
- C.O. Frederick: Model correlations for investigating creep deform and stress relaxation in structure, Journal of Mechanical Engineering Science, Vol. 7 No. 1
- P.J. Armstrong and C.O. Frederick: A mathematical representation of the multiaxial Bauschinger effect. Technical Report RD/B/N 731, C.E.G.B, 1966.
- C.O. Frederick: Heat resistant and flexible pads for the support of rails; London, British Railways Board, Research and Development Division, 1972
- C. O. Frederick and G.W. Morland: Device for applying a massless load to a rail; London, British Railways Board, 1973
- Rail technology: Proceedings of a seminar organised by British Rail Research & Development Division & American Association of Railroads held at Nottingham University 21–26 September 1981; edited by Charles Osmond Frederick & David John Round; 1983, ISBN 0-9508596-0-5
- C.O. Frederick and J.C. Sinclair: A rail corrugation theory which allows for contact patch size, Tech. Univ. Berlin, Rail Corrugations pp. 1–27 (SEE N94-23581 06-31), 1992
- C.O. Frederick: The railways - Challenges to science and technology - A conference sponsored by the Royal Academy of Engineering, The Royal Society, and British Rail, 26 April 1995; PROCEEDINGS OF THE INSTITUTION OF CIVIL ENGINEERS: TRANSPORT 117 (2): 157-158 MAY 1996
- C.O. Frederick and A.P. Young: Infrarail seminars, Manchester, September 1994; PROCEEDINGS OF THE INSTITUTION OF CIVIL ENGINEERS: TRANSPORT 117 (1): 63-66 FEB 1996

== See also ==
- Project Daedalus of the British Interplanetary Society
