= Aircraft engine performance =

Aspect of aircraft design

Aircraft engine performance refers to factors including thrust or shaft power for fuel consumed, weight, cost, outside dimensions and life. It includes meeting regulated environmental limits which apply to emissions of noise and chemical pollutants, and regulated safety aspects which require a design that can safely tolerate environmental hazards such as birds, rain, hail and icing conditions. It is the end product that an engine company sells.

Aircraft engines are part of the propulsion system of an airplane, helicopter, rocket or UAV which produce rotary power transferred to a propeller or kinetic energy as a high-velocity gas exhaust stream. Aircraft engine types include turboprop, turbojet, turbofan and turboshaft. Piston engines are used in recreational personal aircraft and older aircraft. Electric engines are used in model aircraft, small drones, small UAVs and small crewed aircraft. Aircraft engine performance has improved dramatically since the advent of the first powered flight in 1848 by John Stringfellow. Aircraft engine manufacturers have to constantly innovate to remain competitive by offering more efficient and more reliable engines. Improving the performance of aircraft engines reduces the cost of ownership for operators of commercial, military and private aircraft.

== Performance criteria ==
The following are different measures of the engine as a black box and most are negotiated between the engine manufacturer and its customer for a particular aircraft installation. Some, like noise, exhaust pollutants and certain operability requirements, such as acceleration times, are regulated with limits that have to be met for commercial operation. Each is the result of design iterations inside the "black box" using both analytical computer modelling and development testing.

Thrust, Shaft power, Fuel consumption, Weight, Cost, Installation envelope, Overhaul life, Operability, Noise, Exhaust pollutants.

== Factors affecting engine performance ==
=== Fuel ===
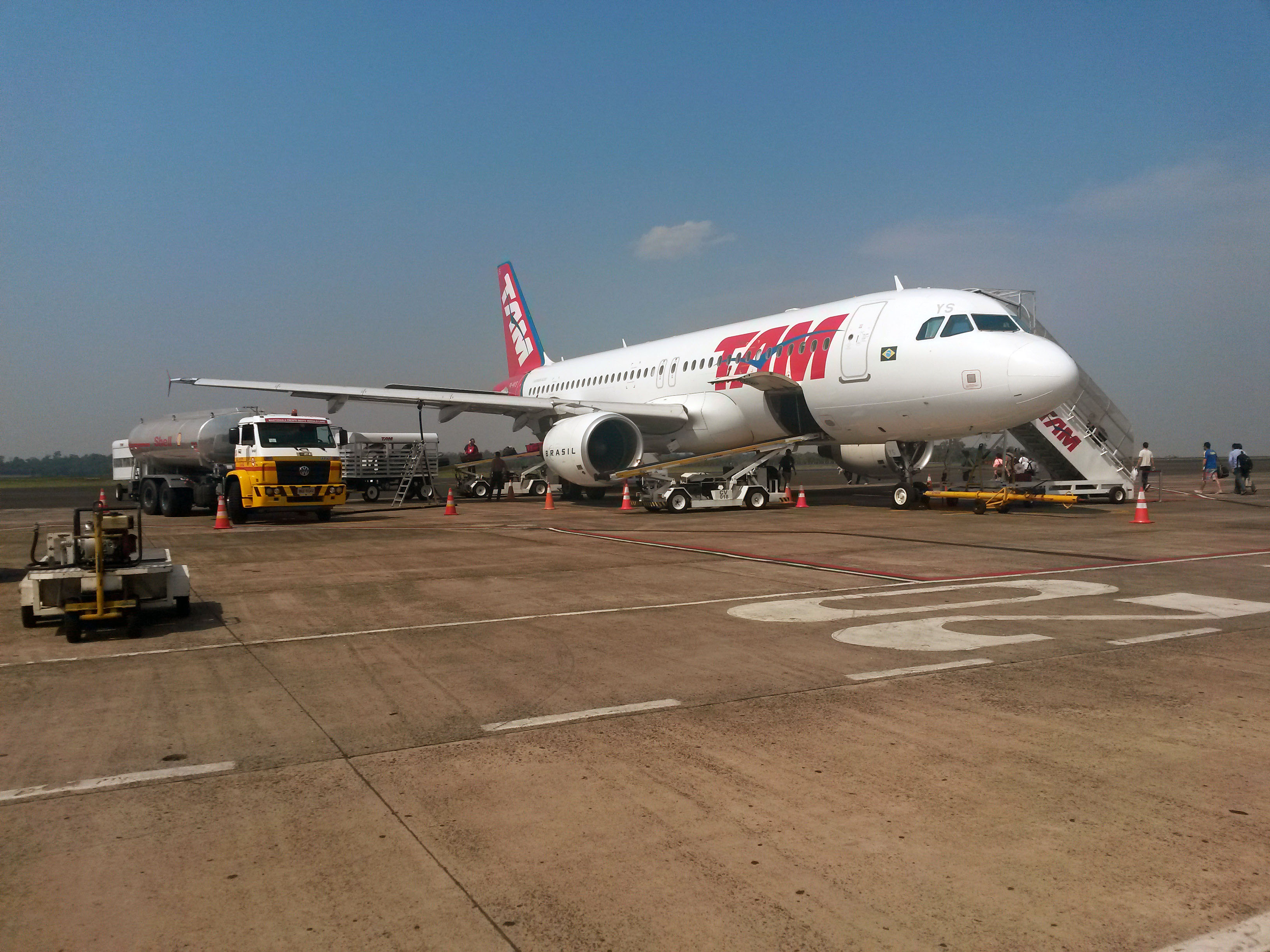
An Airbus A320 being refuelled

The cost of fuel is a significant part of the operating cost of an aircraft, about 56% for a wide-body airliner in 1983. Particular fuels are approved for use in a particular engine to prevent safety and reliability issues. Fuels include jet fuel and AVGAS (aviation gasoline), which differ from automotive engine fuels. Gas turbine engines will run on aviation gasoline as an alternative to jet fuel as in the case of turbojet booster engines on piston-engined aircraft. Small turboprop and business aircraft may be approved for a limited running time on avgas to allow refuelling at remote airstrips with no jet fuel supply. Different fuels are used for different applications due to their performance characteristics.

==== Jet fuel ====
Kerosene jet fuel, also known as aviation turbine fuel (ATF), is designed to be used in aircraft powered by gas turbine engines. Jet fuel used to power gas turbine engines has been the preferred propellant since the advent of this type of engine due to the fuel's favourable combustion characteristics and relatively high energy content. Jet fuel remains the most commonly used fuel in aviation due to the popularity of turbofan and turboprop engines. Turbofan engines power most large commercial passenger and cargo aircraft today. Civil jet fuel grades include A-1, A, B, TS-1. Military grades include JP-4, JP-8 and JP-5. Military varieties differ from civil jet fuels due to the addition of corrosion inhibitors and anti-icing additives. JP-8 jet fuel is the most common fuel among NATO aircraft fleets.

==== AVGAS ====
AVGAS (aviation gasoline) is widely used in reciprocating engines (piston engines). Aviation gasoline is highly volatile and very flammable, with a low flash point, which makes it unsuitable for use in gas turbine engines. Volatility is how easily a substance will change from a liquid to a gaseous state. Highly volatile fuel is required to power reciprocating engines as the liquid gasoline pumped to the carburettor must readily vaporise in order to combust in the engine. There is however a balance of volatility needed. If AVGAS fuel is too volatile, it may cause vapour lock and early detonation in the engine cylinder. If the AVGAS is not volatile enough, there will be inconsistent engine acceleration and power throughout the revolution range. AVGAS is commonly supplemented with Tetraethyl-lead (TEL) to prevent engine knocking, which is a damaging build-up of pressure inside the engine caused by low octane rated fuel which may lead to engine failure in reciprocating engines. Antiknock additives allow for greater efficiency and peak power. TEL has been banned by the European Union for automotive use due to environmental concerns, but remains approved for use in aircraft.

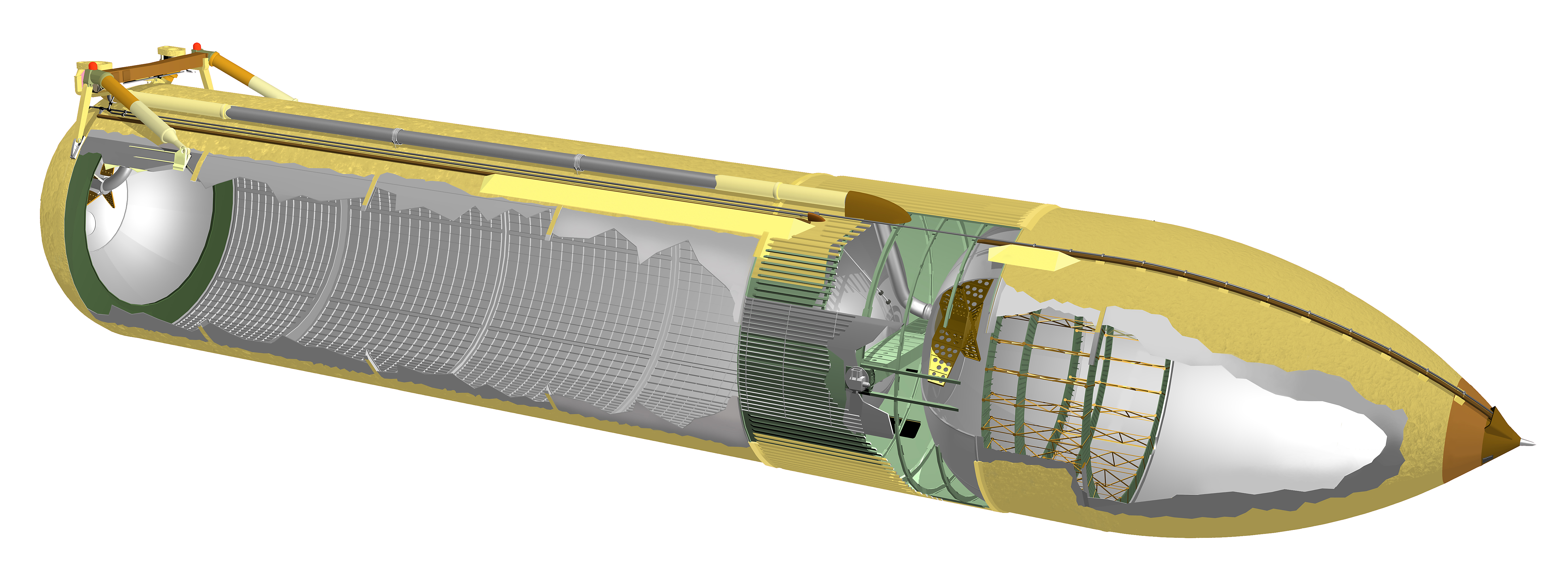
External fuel tank for the Discovery shuttle

==== Rocket fuel ====
Rocket fuel consists of solid, liquid and gel state fuels for propulsion. In order to power rockets, a fuel and an oxidiser are mixed within the combustion chamber, producing a high energy propulsive exhaust as thrust. The main uses for rocket fuel are for space shuttle boosters in order to propel the craft out of the atmosphere, or for missiles. Solid rocket propellant does not degrade in long-term storage and remains reliable on combustion. This allows munitions to remain loaded and fired when needed, which is highly regarded for military use. Once ignited, solid rocket propellants cannot be shut down. The fuel and the oxidiser are stored within a metal casing. Once ignited, the fuel burns from the centre of the solid compound towards the edges of the metal casing. Burn rates and intensity are manipulated by the changing of the shape of a channel between the fuel and the casing shell. Two varieties of solid rocket fuel propellants exist. These include homogeneous and composite solid rocket fuels. These fuels are characteristically dense, stable at ordinary temperatures and easily storable. Liquid fuels are more controllable than solid rocket fuels, and can be shutoff after ignition and restarted, as well as offering greater thrust control. Liquid propellants are stored in two parts in an engine, as the fuel in one tank and an oxidiser in another. These liquids are mixed in the combustion chamber and ignited. Hypergolic fuel is mixed and ignites spontaneously, requiring no separate ignition. Liquid fuel compounds include petroleum, hydrogen and oxygen.

==== Electric ====
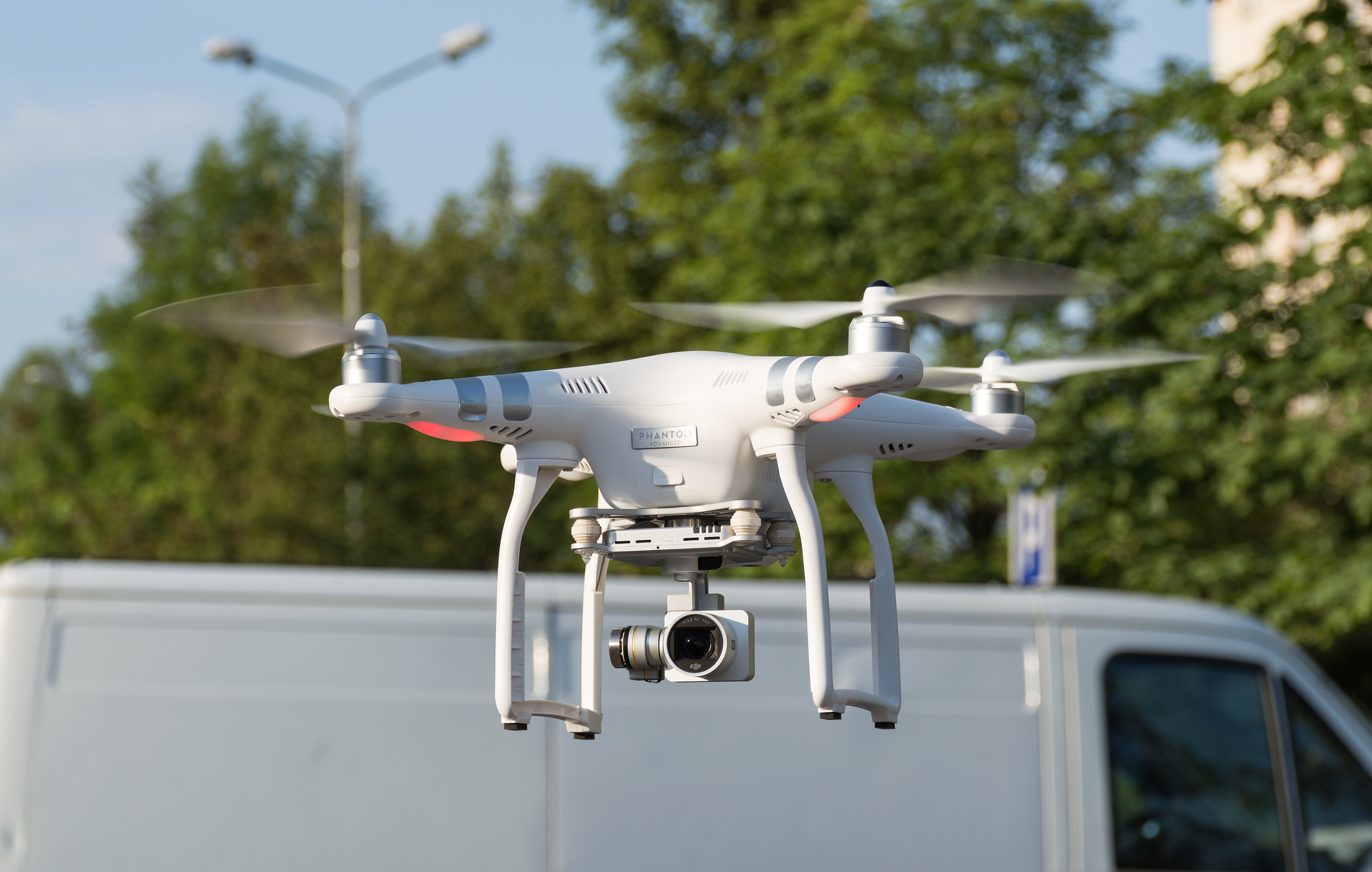
DJI Phantom quadcopter

Electricity may be transmitted to an aircraft's electric motors through batteries, ground power cables, solar cells, ultra-capacitors, fuel cells and power beaming. Electrically powered engines are currently only suitable for light aircraft and UAV's (unmanned aerial vehicles). Electrical engines are praised for being environmentally friendly and relatively quiet. There are a multitude of personal UAV's and drones available for purchase without a licence or age restriction globally, capable of high speed manoeuvres and agile flight characteristics. Typically aircraft with electric engines have significantly shorter flight durations than conventional fuel powered aircraft although battery technology developments and solar energy conversion has created potential for use in commercial aircraft. Jeffrey Engler, CEO of Wright Electric, estimates that commercially viable electric planes will reduce energy costs by 30%.

==== Hydrogen ====
Hydrogen as a fuel, through the combustion of hydrogen in a jet engine or fuel cell, is a viable fuel source for aircraft engines. Currently, pressurised tanks to hold the hydrogen fuel with sufficient volume and a low enough weight are not available for large commercial aircraft, but have been successfully implemented on smaller personal aircraft such as the Boeing Fuel Cell Demonstrator by Boeing Phantom Works and on launch rockets for space shuttles when stored cryogenically. Hydrogen can be used to power a multitude of craft, via turbine engines, piston engines and rocket engines. Hydrogen fuel cells create electrical power through hydrolysis and are in various stages of research for applications in environmentally friendly engines as they emit no toxic exhaust. Hydrogen powered engines only emit water through the bonding of oxygen and hydrogen, as well as any excess hydrogen as exhaust. This means that this is a highly environmentally friendly propulsion system.

==== Electro-aerodynamic thrust ====
Researchers from MIT (Massachusetts Institute of Technology) have developed an ion drive propulsion system with no moving parts. The 'engine' is propelled by ionic wind, also known as electro-aerodynamic thrust. This new form of aircraft propulsion would be completely silent and require far less maintenance than conventional fossil-fuel powered engines. This technology has the potential to be used in conjunction with conventional aircraft combustion engines as a hybrid system with further development or even as propulsion systems on spacecraft.

=== Atmospheric conditions ===
Atmospheric conditions are an important consideration in the analysis of the factors contributing to differing aircraft engine performance. These factors include altitude, temperature and humidity. Aircraft engine performance decreases as altitude and temperature increase. In the case of high humidity, the volume of air available for combustion is reduced, causing losses in power in combustion engines. Aircraft engine performance is measured at baseline parameters of a standard atmosphere (29.92” of mercury) at 15 °C.

Weather may be a physical barrier to aircraft operation, as it is in the case of forecast of hail or volcanic ash, because of the risk of serious damage to all the engines installed on the aircraft.

==== Altitude ====
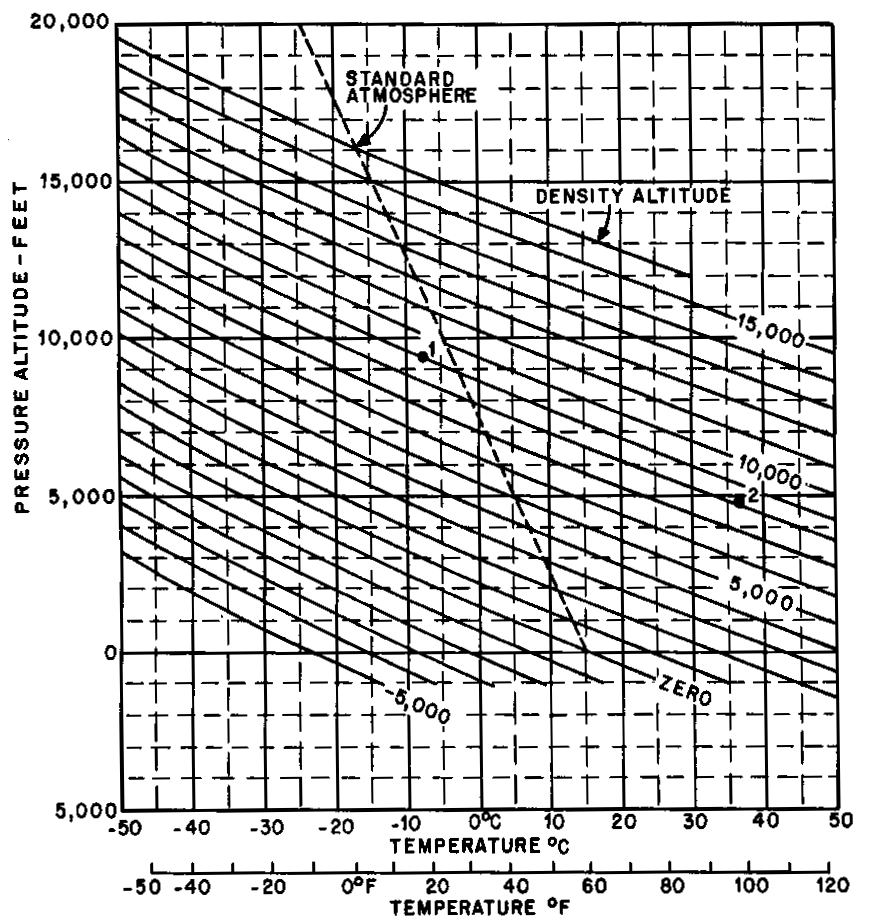
Density altitude chart

When altitude is increased, air density decreases. With lower air density, air molecules are further apart from each other, which will lead to declines in performance of combustion engines. Electric-powered aircraft will not see losses of power output at high altitude, but rather aerodynamic losses as propellers work harder to propel the same amount of air as at ground level. However, cooling capacity will decline on both combustion and electric motors at high altitude due to the lower density of air. This phenomenon is why the operating limit of helicopters is constrained, as propeller thrust returns to a value of 0 when the air becomes too thin at high altitude. This makes high altitude airports significantly more dangerous than airports at sea level.

==== Temperature ====
Temperature has significant effects on the maximum power available and the operational efficiency of an aircraft engine. This applies for combustion and electrical engines. Pilots account for the ambient temperature on the day of a flight in order to calculate the takeoff distance required. Extreme heat or cold temperatures are performance limitations for aircraft engines.

An aircraft flying at a constant altitude with an ambient air temperature of 20 °C would experience more favourable performance than flying with an ambient air temperature of 40 °C. With cold temperatures, air is denser and a larger mass of air/fuel mixture is combusted, leading to higher efficiency and greater power.

==== Humidity ====
Humidity affects the mass of oxygen in each unit of volume of air in the atmosphere, reducing the burn rate and increasing the combustion time of fuel in a combustion engine which will reduce thermal efficiency. Minimal losses of power occur where the energy of the engine's combustion heat the moisture in the engine. For electrical components found within electric motors, excess moisture is capable of damaging circuits and electrical systems. In reality, air is never fully dry, or without moisture in the atmosphere. Even when air is considered dry, it retains a moisture content of around 5%.

==== Weather ====
Weather has significant impacts the performance of an engine, and also the propensity to cause engine malfunction or failure. Winds are both beneficial and unfavourable depending on the direction of the wind and the heading of the aircraft. A significant weakness of many aircraft is their use of propellers or turbines in their engines. This is because any particulates that enter the engine other than air may cause damage. An example of this is hail, when precipitation freezes. If the hail is severe enough, engine inlet guide vanes or compressor blades can bend or break under impact. Volcanic ash ejected into the atmosphere due to a volcanic eruption is another example of reduced engine performance due to weather. Particles of volcanic ash are abrasive at high speed, leading to abrasion on compressor fan blades. The glass-like silicate compound found in volcanic ash has a lower melting point than the combustion temperature of fuel and air in a jet engine. When ingested into the engine, the material melts and deposits in cooler areas of the engine, leading to compressor stall and thrust loss.

== See also ==
- Index of aviation articles
- Jet engine performance
