= Beltway bandit =

Government consulting companies in the US

Beltway bandit is a term for private companies located in or near Washington, D.C., whose major business is to provide consulting services to the federal government of the United States. The phrase was originally a mild insult, implying that the companies preyed like bandits on the generosity of the federal government, but it has lost much of its pejorative nature and is now often used as a neutral, descriptive term.

The term refers to the Capital Beltway, which is a ring road that surrounds Washington. Many federal government contractors have offices and headquarters near the Beltway because of its proximity to federal agencies and legislators. Civilian contractors tend to locate along the Maryland portion of the Beltway, while defense contractors tend to locate along the Virginia section, which is closer to the Pentagon.

== History ==
An early use of the term may have been from a description of thieves who took advantage of the newly constructed Beltway to rob houses from their back yards, which were now exposed to the highway. Neighbors would not have seen them from the front yards, and by the time the police arrived, the thieves would have used the Beltway to escape to another state, when communications between Virginia and Maryland police departments was fairly rudimentary.

== In popular culture ==
"The Beltway Bandits" is an instrumental piece of music by Frank Zappa on his 1986 Jazz from Hell album. Beltway Bandits is also the name of a Mid-Atlantic Women's Hockey League (amateur ice hockey) team in the D.C. area.
