= Magnetic propulsion =

Magnetic propulsion may refer to:

- Magnetic sail, a proposed method of spacecraft propulsion which would use a magnetic field to deflect solar wind
- Linear synchronous motor, a linear motor that uses synchronized electromagnetic pulses to propel a magnetic "rotor"
- Linear induction motor, a linear motor that uses a linearly moving magnetic field acting on conductors within the field to produce force
- Railgun, an electrically powered electromagnetic projectile launcher
- Maglev, a transport method that uses magnetic levitation to move vehicles without touching the ground
