= Plasma magnet =

A plasma magnet is a proposed spacecraft propulsion device that uses a dipole magnetic field to capture energy from the solar wind. The field acts as a sail, using the captured energy to propel the spacecraft analogously to how the wind propels a sailing vessel. It could accelerate a vessel moving away from the sun and decelerate it when approaching a distant star at the end of an interstellar journey. Thrust vectoring and steering could be achieved by manipulating the dipole tilt for any type of magnetic sail.

== Solar wind ==
The solar wind is a stream of energetic charged particles released from the upper atmosphere of a star, such as the Sun, called the corona. This plasma mostly consists of electrons, protons and alpha particles with kinetic energy between 0.5 and 10 keV. The solar wind travels at velocities greater than 10^{5} m/s. Its dynamic pressure is roughly 2 × 10^{−9} N/m2 at 1 AU. A properly designed system allows the spacecraft to accelerate to near the speed of the solar wind. The thrust provided by the solar wind remains constant, regardless of the distance from the Sun, because the plasma magnet expands in size as the distance from the Sun increases.

== Design ==
The basic principle is that a rotating magnetic field, driven by alternating current in a crossed pair of coils, creates a circulating current, and that current then expands in radius until it creates a dipolar magnetic field much larger than the coils' radius.

To achieve sufficient thrust for a spacecraft (0.1-1 N), the "sail" must be at least 4 km in radius. The magnetic field strength must be 50nT.

To create such a field using an electromagnet requires large-scale engineering. A circular electromagnet would reach 300m in radius, carrying 10^{5} amp-turns. Such an electromagnet would likely be so massive that the captured thrust would barely move it. The use of superconducting electromagnets may make a "wind rider" technically feasible.

A travel-relevant balance requires a vessel mass of a few 100 kg and power of at least a few kW.

Phased antennas operating in the radio frequency range produce a rapidly rotating magnetic field. This field preferentially accelerates electrons within a plasma to produce a direct current that can generate a steady state magnetic field that is much larger than can be sustained by practical electromagnets.

== Drag device ==
A drag device is one that is pushed by an external energy source. The classic drag device is a sailing vessel. By contrast, an airplane or a rocket use a fuel source to supply their own energy.

== See also ==
- Gyroradius
- Magnetic sail, plasma magnet (PM)
