= MagBeam =

MagBeam is the name given to an ion propulsion system for space travel initially proposed by Professor Robert Winglee of the Earth and Space Sciences Department at the University of Washington for the October 2004 meeting of the NIAC. MagBeam is different from a traditional electrostatic ion thruster in several ways, the primary one being that instead of the fuel and propulsion system being part of the payload craft, they are instead located on a platform held in orbit. It has also been suggested that the technology could be used to reduce the amount of space debris in orbit around Earth.

== Propulsion system ==
MagBeam propulsion uses a helicon plasma source to produce a plasma beam. A helicon drive consists of a quartz tube wrapped in a radio antenna, into which a gas such as argon or xenon is injected. RF currents pass through the antenna creating a rapid variation of the electric field, ionizing the gas. The ionized gas is accelerated by a magnetic field to produce thrust. The helicon drive produces a tight beam of ions as the magnetic field that accelerates them continuously expands with the plasma beam keeping them focused. This ion beam is used to push a payload which is equipped with a small amount of gas for propellant such as argon or xenon, a power source and a set of electromagnets to produce a mini-magnetosphere magnetic sail. The gas propellant is ejected into the plasma beam being directed at the craft which heats and ionizes it.

The electromagnets repel this ionized gas imparting thrust upon the payload. This results in an acceleration of around 1 ms^{−2}, much faster than traditional ion propulsion systems. This amount of acceleration would make it possible to make a trip to Mars in as little as 50 days, reaching speeds as high as 20 km/s. The deceleration is accomplished by having another platform at the other end of the journey directing a plasma beam at the payload. By eliminating the mass of the propulsion system from the payload the MagBeam system allows for much faster acceleration and higher top speeds than conventional propulsion systems mounted on the payload. One problem with the system is the need for a sufficiently dense power-source, with a massive battery bank being proposed for an Earth-Mars Mag-Beam facility massing some 3,000 tons.

The system proposed by Winglee would allow a round-trip from Earth to Mars in 90 days, with 11 days stop-over at Mars.

A similar system for use of a particle beam to push a mini-magnetosphere magnetic sail was proposed by Geoffrey A. Landis in 2001 as a possible propulsion system for interstellar travel.

== Space debris clearance ==
Winglee has also proposed that the technology could be used to help clear space debris in Earth orbit by pushing items of debris out of orbit towards the atmosphere where they could burn up safely.
