= Magnetic sail =

Proposed spacecraft propulsion method

Magnetic sail animation

A magnetic sail is a proposed method of spacecraft propulsion where an onboard magnetic field source interacts with a plasma wind (e.g., the solar wind) to form an artificial magnetosphere (similar to Earth's magnetosphere) that acts as a sail, transferring force from the wind to the spacecraft requiring little to no propellant as detailed for each proposed magnetic sail design in this article.

The animation and the following text summarize the magnetic sail physical principles involved. The spacecraft's magnetic field source, represented by the purple dot, generates a magnetic field, shown as expanding black circles. Under conditions summarized in the overview section, this field creates a magnetosphere whose leading edge is a magnetopause and a bow shock composed of charged particles captured from the wind by the magnetic field, as shown in blue, which deflects subsequent charged particles from the plasma wind coming from the left.

Specific attributes of the artificial magnetosphere around the spacecraft for a specific design significantly affect performance as summarized in the overview section. A magnetohydrodynamic model (verified by computer simulations and laboratory experiments) predicts that the interaction of the artificial magnetosphere with the oncoming plasma wind creates an effective sail blocking area that transfers force as shown by a sequence of labeled arrows from the plasma wind, to the spacecraft's magnetic field, to the spacecraft's field source, which accelerates the spacecraft in the same direction as the plasma wind.

These concepts apply to all proposed magnetic sail system designs, with the difference how the design generates the magnetic field and how efficiently the field source creates the artificial magnetosphere described above. The History of concept section summarizes key aspects of the proposed designs and relationships between them as background. The cited references are technical with many equations and in order to make the information more accessible, this article first describes in text (and illustrations where available) beginning in the overview section and prior to each design, section or groups of equations and plots intended for the technically oriented reader. The beginning of each proposed design section also contains a summary of the important aspects so that a reader can skip the equations for that design. The differences in the designs determine performance measures, such as the mass of the field source and necessary power, which in turn determine force, mass and hence acceleration and velocity that enable a performance comparison between magnetic sail designs at the end of this article. A comparison with other spacecraft propulsion methods includes some magnetic sail designs where the reader can click on the column headers to compare magnetic sail performance with other propulsion methods. The following observations result from this comparison: magnetic sail designs have insufficient thrust to launch from Earth, thrust (drag) for deceleration for the magsail in the interstellar medium is relatively large, and both the magsail and magnetoplasma sail have significant thrust for travel away from Earth using the force from the solar wind.

== History of concept ==
An overview of many of the magnetic sail proposed designs with illustrations from the references was published in 2018 by Djojodihardjo. The earliest method proposed by Andrews and Zubrin in 1988, dubbed the magsail, has the significant advantage of requiring no propellant and is thus a form of propellantless propulsion that can operate indefinitely. A drawback of the magsail design was that it required a large (50–100 km radius) superconducting loop carrying large currents with a mass on the order of 100 tonnes (100,000 kg). The magsail design also described modes of operation for interplanetary transfers, thrusting against a planetary ionosphere or magnetosphere, escape from low Earth orbit as well as deceleration of an interstellar craft over decades after being initially accelerated by other means, for example. a fusion rocket, to a significant fraction of light speed, with a more detailed design published in 2000. In 2015, Freeland validated most of the initial magsail analysis, but determined that thrust predictions were optimistic by a factor of 3.1 due to a numerical integration error.

Subsequent designs proposed and analyzed means to significantly reduce mass. These designs require little to modest amounts of exhausted propellant and can thrust for years. All proposed designs describe thrust from solar wind outwards from the Sun. In 2000, Winglee and Slough proposed a Mini-Magnetospheric Plasma Propulsion (M2P2) design that injected low energy plasma into a much smaller coil with much lower mass that required low power. Simulations predicted impressive performance relative to mass and required power; however, a number of critiques raised issues: that the assumed magnetic field falloff rate was optimistic and that thrust was dramatically overestimated.

Starting in 2003, Funaki and others published a series of theoretical, simulation and experimental investigations at JAXA in collaboration with Japanese universities addressing some of the issues from criticisms of M2P2 and named their approach the MagnetoPlasma Sail (MPS). In 2011, Funaki and Yamakawa authored a chapter in a book that is a good reference for magnetic sail theory and concepts. MPS research resulted in many published papers that advanced the understanding of physical principles for magnetic sails. Best performance occurred when the injected plasma had a lower density and velocity than considered in M2P2. Thrust gain was computed as compared with performance with a magnetic field only in 2013 and 2014. Investigations and experiments continued reporting increased thrust experimentally and numerically considering use of a Magnetoplasmadynamic thruster (aka MPD Arc jet in Japan) in 2015, multiple antenna coils in 2019, and a multi-pole MPD thruster in 2020.

Slough published in 2004 and 2006 a method to generate the static magnetic dipole for a magnetic sail in a design called the Plasma magnet (PM) that was described as an AC induction motor turned inside out. A pair of small perpendicularly oriented coils acted as the stator powered by an alternating current to generate a rotating magnetic field (RMF) that analysis predicted and laboratory experiments demonstrated that a current disc formed as the rotor outside the stator. The current disk formed from electrons captured from the plasma wind, therefore requiring little to no plasma injection. Predictions of substantial improvements in terms of reduced coil size (and hence mass) and markedly lower power requirements for significant thrust hypothesized the same optimistic magnetic field falloff rate as assumed for M2P2. In 2022, a spaceflight trial dubbed Jupiter Observing Velocity Experiment (JOVE) proposed using a plasma magnet based sail for a spacecraft named Wind Rider using the solar wind to accelerate away from a point near Earth and decelerate against the magnetosphere of Jupiter.

A 2012, study by Kirtley and Slough investigated using the plasma magnet technology to use plasma in a planetary ionosphere as a braking mechanism and was called the Plasma Magnetoshell. This paper restated the magnetic field falloff rate to the value suggested in the critiques of M2P2 that dramatically reduces analytical predicted performance. Initial missions targeted deceleration in the ionosphere of Mars. Kelly and Little in 2019 published simulation results using a multi-turn coil and not the plasma magnet showed that the magnetoshell was viable for orbital insertion around Mars, Jupiter, Neptune and Uranus and in 2021 showed that it was more efficient than aerocapture for Neptune.

In 2021, Zhenyu Yang and others published an analysis, numerical calculations and experimental verification for a propulsion system that was a combination of the magnetic sail and the electric sail called an electromagnetic sail. A superconducting magsail coil augmented by an electron gun at the coil's center generates an electric field as in an electric sail that deflects positive ions in the plasma wind thereby providing additional thrust, which could reduce overall system mass.

== Overview ==

The Modes of operation section describes the important parameters of plasma particle density and wind velocity in conjunction with a use case for:

- Operation in a stellar (e.g., Sun) wind.
- Deceleration in the interstellar medium (ISM).
- Operation in a planetary ionosphere or planetary magnetosphere.

The Physical principles section details aspects of how charged particles in a plasma wind interact with a magnetic field and conditions that determine how much thrust force results on the spacecraft in terms of particle's behavior in a plasma wind, as well as the form and magnitude of the magnetic field related to conditions within the magnetosphere that differ for the proposed designs.

Charged particles such as electrons, protons and ions travel in straight lines in a vacuum in the absence of a magnetic field. As shown in the illustration in the presence of a magnetic field shown in green, charged particles gyrate in circular arcs with blue indicating positively charged particles (e.g., protons) and red indicating electrons. The particle's gyroradius is proportional to the ratio of the particle's momentum (product of mass and velocity) over the magnetic field. At 1 Astronomical Unit (AU), the distance from the Sun to the Earth, the gyroradius of a proton is ~72 km and since a proton is ~1,836 times the mass of an electron, the gyroradius of an electron is ~40 m with the illustration not drawn to scale. For the magsail deceleration in the interstellar medium (ISM) mode of operation the velocity is a significant fraction of light speed, for example 5% c, the gyroradius is ~ 500 km for protons and ~280 m for electrons. When the magsail magnetopause radius is much less than the proton gyroradius the magsail kinematic model by Gros in 2017, which considered only protons, predicts a marked reduction in thrust force for initial ship velocity greater than 10% c prior to deceleration. When the magnetosphere radius is much greater than the spacecraft's magnetic field source radius, all proposed designs, except for the magsail, use a magnetic dipole approximation for an Amperian loop shown in the center of the illustration with the X indicating current flowing into the page and the dot indicating current flowing out of the page. The illustration shows the resulting magnetic field lines and their direction, where the closer spacing of lines indicates a stronger field. Since the magsail uses a large superconducting coil that has a radius on the same order as the magnetosphere the details of that design use the magsail MHD model employing the Biot–Savart law that predicts stronger magnetic fields near and inside the coil than the dipole model. A Lorentz force occurs only for the portion of a charged particle's velocity at a right angle to the magnetic field lines and this constitutes the magnetic force depicted in the summary animation. Electrically neutral particles, such as neutrons, atoms and molecules are unaffected by a magnetic field.

A condition for applicability of magnetohydrodynamic (MHD) theory, which models charged particles as fluid flows, is that to achieve maximum force the radius of the artificial magnetosphere be on the same order as the ion gyroradius for the plasma environment for a particular mode of operation. Another important condition is how the proposed design affects the magnetic field falloff rate inside the magnetosphere, which impacts the field source mass and power requirements. For a radial distance r from the spacecraft's magnetic field source in a vacuum the magnetic field falls off as $1/r^{f_o}$, where $f_o$ is the falloff rate. Classic magnetic dipole theory covers the case of $f_o$=3 as used in the magsail design. When plasma is injected and/or captured near the field source, the magnetic field falls off at a rate of $1 \leq f_o \leq 2$, a topic that has been a subject of much research, criticism and differs between designs and has changed over time for the plasma magnet. The M2P2 and plasma magnet designs initially assumed $f_o$=1 that as shown in numerical examples summarized at the end of the corresponding design sections predicted a very large performance gain. Several researchers independently created a magnetic field model where $1 \leq f_o \leq 3$ and asserted that an $f_o$=2 falloff rate was the best achievable. In 2011 the plasma magnet author changed the falloff rate $f_o$ from 1 to 2 and that is the value used for the plasma magnet for performance comparison in this article. The magnetoplasma sail (MPS) design is an evolution of the M2P2 concept that has been extensively documented, numerically analyzed and simulated and reported a falloff rate $f_o$ between 1.5 and 2.

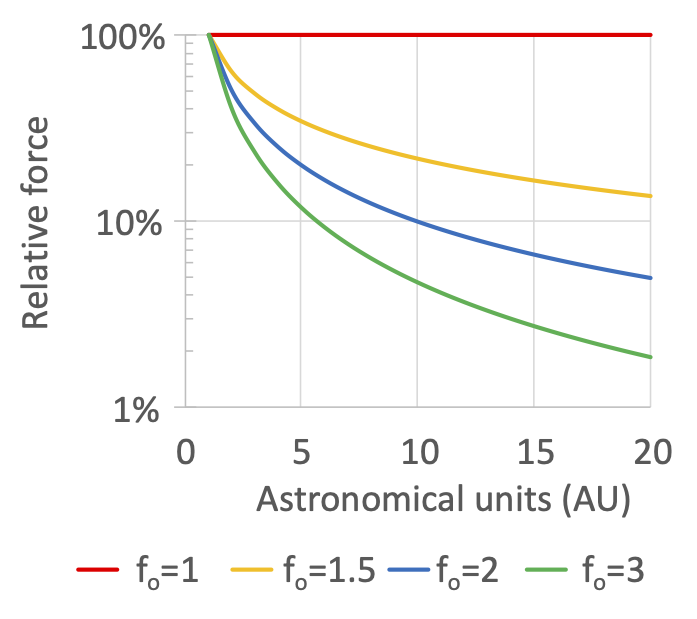

The falloff rate $f_o$ has a significant impact on performance or the mode of operation accelerating away from the Sun where the mass density of ions in the plasma decreases according to an Inverse-square law with distance from the Sun (e.g., AU) increases. The illustration shows in a semi-log plot the impact of falloff rate $f_o$ on relative force F from Equation MFM.6 versus distance from the Sun ranging from 1 to 20 AU, the approximate distance of Neptune. The distance to Jupiter is approximately 5 AU. Constant force independent of distance from the Sun for $f_o$=1 is stated in several plasma magnet references, for example Slough and Freeze and results from the effective increase in sail blocking area to exactly offset reduced plasma mass density as a magnetic sail spacecraft accelerates in response to the plasma wind force away from the Sun. As seen from the illustration the impact of falloff rate $f_o$ on force, and therefore acceleration, becomes grerater as distance from the Sun increases.

At scales where the artificial magnetospheric object radius is much less than the ion gyroradius but greater than the electron gyroradius, the realized force is markedly reduced and electrons create force in proportion much greater than their relative mass with respect to ions as detailed in the General kinematic model section where researchers report results from a compute intensive method that simulates individual particle interactions with the magnetic field source.

== Modes of operation ==
Magnetic sail modes of operation cover the mission profile and plasma environment (pe), such as the solar wind, (sw) a planetary ionosphere (pi) or magnetosphere (pm), or the interstellar medium (ism). Symbolically equations in this article use the pe acronym as a subscript to generic variables, for example as described in this section the plasma mass density $\rho_{pe}$ and from the spacecraft point of view the apparent wind velocity $u_{pe}$.

=== Plasma mass density and velocity terminology and units ===
A plasma consists exclusively of charged particles that can interact with a magnetic or electric field. It does not include neutral particles, such as neutrons. atoms or molecules.The plasma mass density ρ used in magnetohydrodynamic models only require a weighted average mass density of charged particles that includes neutrons in the ion, while kinematic models use the values for each specific ion type and in some cases the parameters for electrons as well as detailed in the Magnetohydrodynamic model section.

The velocity distribution of ions and electrons is another important parameter but often analyses use only the average velocity for the aggregate of particles in a plasma wind for a particular plasma environment (pe) is $v_{pe}$. The apparent wind velocity $u_{sc}$ as seen by a spacecraft traveling at velocity $v_{sc}$ (positive meaning acceleration in the same direction as the wind and negative meaning deceleration opposite the wind direction) for a particular plasma environment (pe) is $u_{sc}=v_{pe}-v_{sc}$.

=== Acceleration/deceleration in a stellar plasma wind ===
Many designs, analyses, simulations and experiments focus on using a magnetic sail in the solar wind plasma to accelerate a spacecraft away from the Sun. Near the Earth's orbit at 1 AU the plasma flows at velocity $v_{sw}$ dynamically ranges from 250 to 750 km/s (typically 500), with a density ranging from 3 to 10 particles per cubic centimeter (typically 6) as reported by the NOAA real-time solar wind tracking web site Assuming that 8% of the solar wind is helium and the remainder hydrogen, the average solar wind plasma mass density at 1 AU is $4\times10^{-21}<\rho_{sw}(1)<10^{-20}$ kg/m^{3} (typically 10^{−20} kg/m^{3}).

The average plasma mass density of ions $\rho_{sw}$ decreases according to an Inverse-square law with the distance from the Sun as stated by Andrews/Zubrin and Borgazzi. The velocity for values near the Sun is nearly constant, falling off slowly after 1 AU and then rapidly decreases at heliopause.

=== Deceleration in interstellar medium (ISM) ===
A spacecraft accelerated to very high velocities by other means, such as a fusion rocket or laser pushed lightsail, can decelerate even from relativistic velocities without onboard propellant by using a magnetic sail to create thrust (drag) against the interstellar medium plasma environment. As shown in the section on Magsail kinematic model (MKM), feasible uses of this involve maximum velocities below 10% c, taking decades to decelerate, for total travel times on the order of a century as described in the magsail specific designs section.

Only the magsail references consider deceleration in the ISM on approach to Alpha ($\alpha$) Centauri, which as shown in the figure is separated by the local bubble and the G-clouds and the Solar System, which is moving at velocity $v_{sun}$ and the local cloud is moving at velocity $v_{L|C}$. Estimates of the number of protons range between 0.005 and 0.5 cm^{−3} resulting in a plasma mass density $9\times10^{-24}<\rho_{im}<3\times10^{-22}$ kg/m^{3}, which covers the range used by references in the magsail specific designs section. As summarized in the magsail specific design section, Gros cited references indicating that regions of the G-clouds may be colder and have a low ion density. A typical value assumed for approach to Alpha Centauri is a proton number density $n_{i}$ of 0.1 protons per cm^{3} corresponding to $\rho_{im}\approx 10^{-22}$ kg/m^{3}.

The spacecraft velocity $v_{sc}$ is much greater than the ISM velocity at the beginning of a deceleration maneuver so the apparent plasma wind velocity from the spacecraft's viewpoint s approximately $u_{im} \approx - v_{sc}$.

Radio emissions of cyclotron radiation due to interaction of charged particles in the interstellar medium as they spiral around the magnetic field lines of a magnetic sail would have a frequency of approximately $120 \, v_{sc}/c$ kHz. The Earth's ionosphere would prevent detection on the surface, but a space-based antenna could detect such emissions up to several thousands of light years away. Detection of such radiation could indicate activity of advanced extraterrestrial civilizations.

=== In a planetary ionosphere ===
A spacecraft approaching a planet with a significant upper atmosphere such as Saturn or Neptune could use a magnetic sail to decelerate by ionizing neutral atoms such that it behaves as a low beta plasma. The plasma mass in a planetary ionosphere (pi) $\rho_{pi}$ is composed of multiple ion types and varies by altitude. The spacecraft velocity $v_{sc}$ is much greater than the planetary ionosphere velocity in a deceleration maneuver so the apparent plasma wind velocity is approximately $u_{pi} \approx - v_{sc}$ at the beginning of a deceleration maneuver.

=== In a planetary magnetosphere ===
Inside or near a planetary magnetosphere, a magnetic sail can thrust against or be attracted to a planet's magnetic field created by a dynamo, especially in an orbit that passes over the planet's magnetic poles. When the magnetic sail and planet's magnetic field are in opposite directions an attractive force occurs and when the fields are in the same direction a repulsive force occurs, which is not stable and means to prevent the sail from flipping over is necessary.

The thrust that a magnetic sail delivers within a magnetosphere decreases with the fourth power of its distance from the planet's internal magnetic field. When close to a planet with a strong magnetosphere such as Earth or a gas giant, the magnetic sail could generate more thrust by interacting with the magnetosphere instead of the solar wind. When operating near a planetary or stellar magnetosphere the effect of that magnetic field must be considered if it is on the same order as the gravitational field.

By varying the magnetic sail's field strength and orientation a "perigee kick" can be achieved raising the altitude of the orbit's apogee higher and higher, until the magnetic sail is able to leave the planetary magnetosphere and catch the solar wind. The same process in reverse can be used to lower or circularize the apogee of a magsail's orbit when it arrives at a destination planet with a magnetic field.

In theory, it is possible for a magnetic sail to launch directly from the surface of a planet near one of its magnetic poles, repelling itself from the planet's magnetic field. However, this requires the magnetic sail to be maintained in an "unstable" orientation. Furthermore, the magnetic sail must have extraordinarily strong magnetic fields for a launch from Earth, requiring superconductors supporting 80 times the current density of the best known high-temperature superconductors as of 1991.

In 2022 a spaceflight trial dubbed Jupiter Observing Velocity Experiment (JOVE) proposed using a plasma magnet to decelerate against the magnetosphere of Jupiter.

== Physical principles ==
Physical principles involved include: interaction of magnetic fields with moving charged particles; an artificial magnetosphere model analogous to the Earth's magnetosphere, MHD and kinematic mathematical models for interaction of an artificial magnetosphere with a plasma flow characterized by mass and number density and velocity, and performance measures; such as, force achieved, energy requirements and the mass of the magnetic sail system.

=== Magnetic field interaction with charged particles ===
An ion or electron with charge q in a plasma moving at velocity v in a magnetic field B and electric field E is treated as an idealized point charge in the Lorentz force $\mathbf{F} = q\,\mathbf{E} + q\,\mathbf{v} \times \mathbf{B}$. This means that the force on an ion or electron is proportional to the product of their charge q and velocity component $v$ perpendicular to the magnetic field flux density B, in SI units as teslas (T). A magnetic sail design introduces a magnetic field into a plasma flow which under certain conditions deflects the electrons and ions from their original trajectory with the particle's momentum transferred to the sail and hence the spacecraft thereby creating thrust. An electric sail uses an electric field E that under certain conditions interact with charged particles to create thrust.

=== Artificial magnetospheric model ===
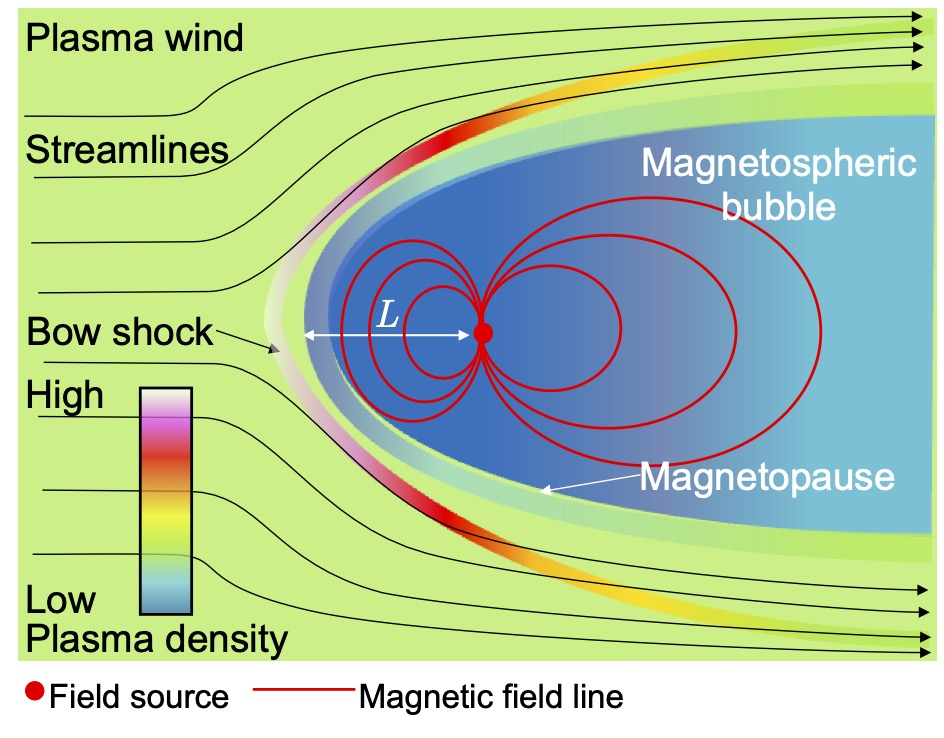
Artificial magnetospheric model

The characteristics of the Earth's magnetosphere have been widely studied as a basis for magnetic sails. The figure shows streamlines of charged particles from a plasma wind from the Sun (or a star) or an effective wind when decelerating in the ISM flowing from left to right. A source attached to a spacecraft generates a magnetic field. Under certain conditions at the boundary where magnetic pressure equals the plasma wind kinetic pressure an artificial bow shock and magnetopause forms at a characteristic length $L$ from the field source. The ionized plasma wind particles create a current sheet along the magnetopause, which compresses the magnetic field lines facing the oncoming plasma wind by a factor of 2 at magnetopause as shown in Figure 2a. The magnetopause deflects charged particles, which affects their streamlines and increases the density at magnetopause. A magnetospheric bubble or cavity forms that has very low density downstream from the magnetopause. Upstream from the magnetopause a bow shock develops. Simulation results often show the particle density through use of color with an example shown in the legend in the lower left. This figure uses aspects of the general structure from Zubrin, Toivanen and Funaki and aspects of the plasma density from Khazanov and Cruz.

=== Magnetohydrodynamic model ===
Magnetic sail designs operating in a plasma wind share a theoretical foundation based upon a magnetohydrodynamic (MHD) model, sometimes called a fluid model, from plasma physics for an artificially generated magnetosphere. Under certain conditions, the plasma wind and the magnetic sail are separated by a magnetopause that blocks the charged particles, which creates a drag force that transfers (at least some) momentum to the magnetic sail, which then applies thrust to the attached spacecraft as described in Andrews/Zubrin, Cattell, Funaki, and Toivanen.

A plasma environment has fundamental parameters, and if a cited reference uses cgs units these should be converted to SI units as defined in the NRL plasma formulary, which this article uses as a reference for plasma parameter units not defined in SI units. The major parameters for plasma mass density are: the number of ions of type $i$ per unit volume $n_i$ the mass of each ion type accounting for isotopes $m_i$ and the number of electrons $n_e$ per unit volume each with electron mass $m_e$. An average plasma mass density per unit volume for charged particles in a plasma environment $pe$ ($sw$ for stellar wind, $pi$ for planetary ionosphere, $im$ for interstellar medium) is expressed in equation form from magnetohydrodynamics as$\textstyle \rho_{pe} = n_e m_e + \sum_{i}n_i m_i$. Note that this definition includes the mass of neutrons in an ion's nucleus. In SI Units per unit volume is cubic metre (m^{−3}), mass is kilogram (kg), and mass density is kilogram per cubic metre (kg/m^{3}).

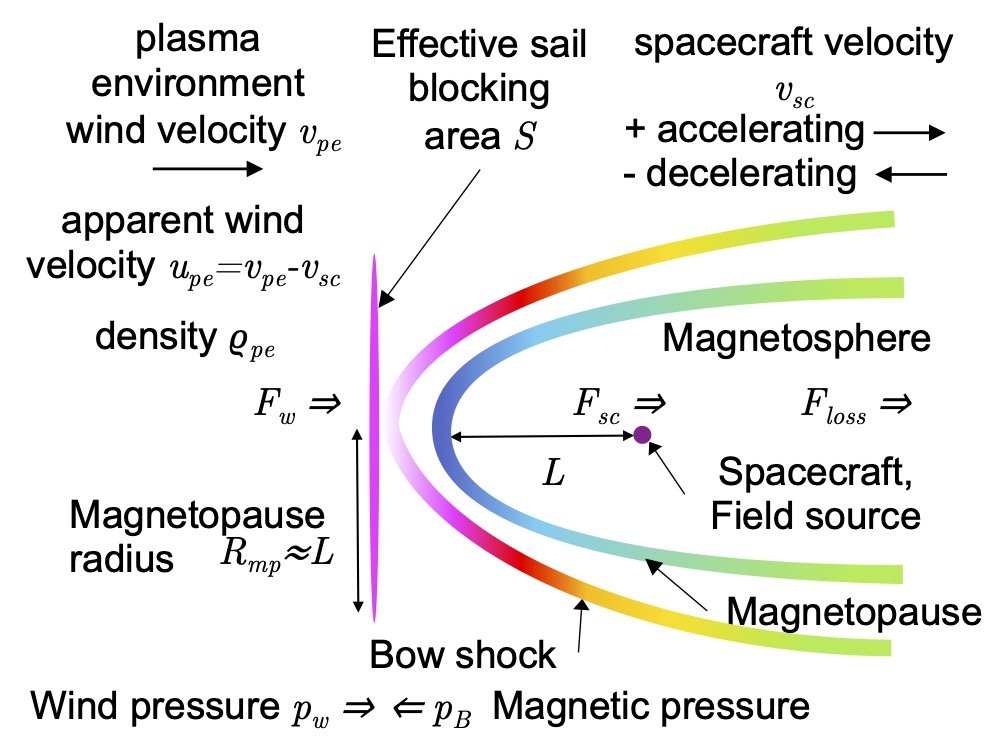
Artificial Magnetosphere Model of Basic Magnetic Sail

The figure depicts the MHD model as described in Funaki and Djojodihardjo. Starting from the left a plasma wind in a plasma environment (e.g., stellar, ISM or an ionosphere) of effective velocity $v_{pe}$ with density $\rho_{pe}$ encounters a spacecraft with time-varying velocity $v_{sc}$ that is positive if accelerating and negative if decelerating. The apparent plasma wind velocity from the spacecraft's viewpoint is $u_{pe}=v_{pe}-v_{sc}$. The spacecraft and field source generate a magnetic field that creates a magnetospheric bubble extending out to a magnetopause preceded by a bow shock that deflects electrons and ions from the plasma wind. At the magnetopause the field source magnetic pressure equals the kinetic pressure of the plasma wind at a standoff shown at the bottom of the figure. The characteristic length $L$ is that of a circular sail of effective blocking area $S=\pi \, R_{mp}^2$ where $R_{mp} \approx L$ is the effective magnetopause radius. Under certain conditions the plasma wind pushing on the artificial magnetosphere bow shock and magnetopause creates a force $F_w$ on the magnetic field source that is physically attached to the spacecraft so that at least part of the force $F_w$ causes a force $F_{sc}$ on the spacecraft, accelerating it when sailing downwind or decelerating when sailing into a headwind. Under certain conditions and in some designs, some of the plasma wind force may be lost as indicated by $F_{loss}$ on the right side.

All magnetic sail designs assume a standoff between plasma wind pressure $p_w$ and magnetic pressure $p_B$ with SI units of Pascal (Pa, or N/m^{2}) differing only in a constant coefficient $C_{SO}$ as follows:

$p_w=\rho u^2 =p_B=\frac{B_{mp}^2}{C_{SO} \mu _0}$	MHD.1

where $u$ is the apparent wind velocity and $\rho$ is the plasma mass density for a specific plasma environment, $B_{mp}$ the magnetic field flux density at magnetopause, μ_{0} is the vacuum permeability (N A^{−2}) and $C_{SO}$ is a constant that differs by reference as follows for $C_{SO}=2$ corresponding to $p_w$ modeled as dynamic pressure with no magnetic field compression, $C_{SO}=1$ for $p_w$ modeled as ram pressure with no magnetic field compression and $C_{SO}=1/2$ for $p_w$ modeled as ram pressure with magnetic field compression by a factor of 2 Equation MHD.1 can be solved to yield the required magnetic field $B_{mp}$ that satisfies the pressure balance at magnetopause standoff as:

$$B_{mp}=u \sqrt{\rho \, \mu_0 \, C_{SO} }$$	MHD.2

The force with SI Units of Newtons (N) derived by a magnetic sail for a plasma environment is determined from MHD equations as reported by principal researchers Funaki, Slough, Andrews and Zubrin, and Toivanen as follows:

$$F_w= C_d\ \rho  \frac{u^2}{2} S = C_d\ \rho  \frac{u^2}{2} \pi L^2$$	MHD.3

where $C_d$ is a coefficient of drag determined by numerical analysis and/or simulation, $\rho u^2/2$ is the wind pressure, and $S=\pi R_{mp}^2$ is the effective blocking area of the magnetic sail with magnetopause radius $R_{mp} \approx L$. Note that this equation has the same form as the drag equation in fluid dynamics. $C_d$ is a function of coil attack angle on thrust and steering angle. The power (W) of the plasma wind is the product of velocity and a constant force

$$P_w= u \, F_w =  C_d\ \rho  \frac{u^3}{2} \pi R_{mp}^2 = \frac {C_d u \pi}{2 \mu_0 C_{SO} } R_{mp}^2 B_{mp}^2$$	MHD.4

where equation MHD.2 was used to derive the right side.

==== MHD applicability test ====
As summarized in the overview section, an important condition for a magnetic sail to generate maximum force is that the magnetopause radius be on the order of an ion's radius of gyration. Through analysis, numerical calculation, simulation and experimentation an important condition for a magnetic sail to generate significant force is the MHD applicability test, which states that the standoff distance $L$ must be significantly greater than the ion gyroradius, also called the Larmor radius or cyclotron radius:

$$r_g=\frac {m_i v_\perp}{\mid q \mid B_x C_{Li} }$$	MHD.5

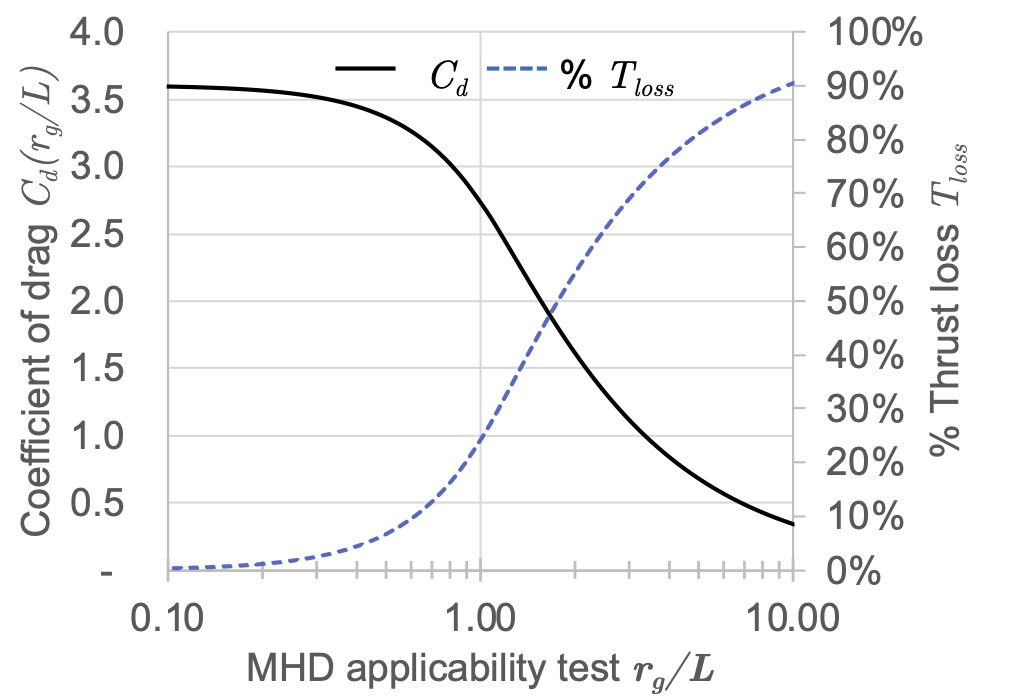

where $m_i$ is the ion mass, $v_\perp$ is the velocity of a particle perpendicular to the magnetic field, $|q|$ is the elementary charge of the ion, $B_x$ is the magnetic field flux density at the point of reference $x$ and $C_{Li}$ is a constant that differs by source with $C_{Li}=1$ and $C_{Li}=2$. For example, in the solar wind with 5 ions/cm^{3} at 1 AU with $m_i$ the proton mass (kg), $v_\perp = v_{sw}$ = 400 km/s, $B_x=B_{mp}$ = 36 nT with $C_{SO}$=0.5 from equation MHD.2 at magnetopause and $C_{Li}$=2 then $r_g \approx$ 72 km. The MHD applicability test is the ratio $r_g/L$. The figure plots $C_d$ on the left vertical axis and lost thrust on the right vertical axis versus the ratio $r_g/L$. When $r_g/L<1$, $C_d=3.6$ is maximum, at $r_g/L\approx 1$, $C_d=2.7$, a decrease of 25% from the maximum and at $r_g/L\approx 2$, $C_d\approx 1.5$, a 45% decrease. As $r_g/L$ increases beyond one, $C_d$ decreases meaning less thrust from the plasma wind transfers to the spacecraft and is instead lost to the plasma wind. In 2004, Fujita published numerical analysis using a hybrid PIC simulation using a magnetic dipole model that treated electrons as a fluid and a kinematic model for ions to estimate the coefficient of drag $C_d$ for a magnetic sail operating in the radial orientation resulting in the following approximate formula:

$$C_d(r_g/L) = \begin{cases} 3.6 \, e^{-0.28 (r_g/L)^2}, & \text {for }  r_g/L <1 \\ \frac{3.4}{r_g/L}e^{-0.22 (L/r_g)^2}, & \text {for } r_g/L \ge 1 \end{cases}$$	MHD.6

The lost thrust is $T_{loss}=(1-C_d(r_g/L))/3.6$.

==== Coil attack angle effect on thrust and steering angle ====
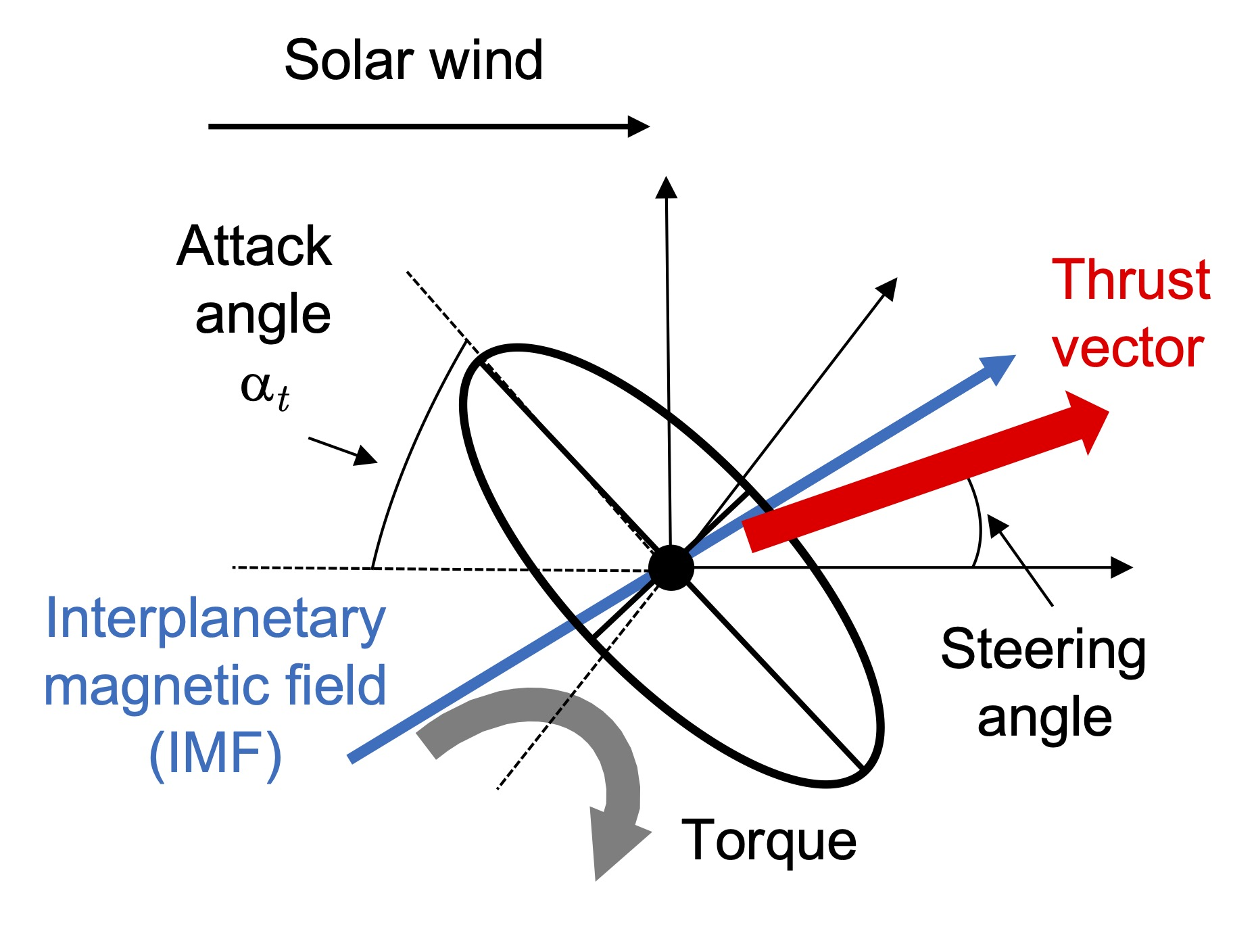
Coil magnetic field orientation and forces

In 2005 Nishida and others published results from numerical analysis of an MHD model for interaction of the solar wind with a magnetic field of current flowing in a coil that momentum is indeed transferred to the magnetic field produced by field source and hence to the spacecraft. Thrust force derives from the momentum change of the solar wind, pressure by the solar wind on the magnetopause from equation MHD.1 and Lorentz force from currents induced in the magnetosphere interacting with the field source. The results quantified the coefficient of drag, steering (i.e., thrust direction) angle with the solar wind, and torque generated as a function of attack angle (i.e., orientation) The figure illustrates how the attack (or coil tilt) angle $\alpha _t$ orientation of the coil creates a steering angle for the thrust vector and also torque imparted to the coil. Also shown is the vector for the interplanetary magnetic field (IMF), which at 1 AU varies with waves and other disturbances in the solar wind, known as space weather, and can significantly increase or decrease the thrust of a magnetic sail.

For a coil with radial orientation (like a Frisbee) the attack angle $\alpha _t$= 0° and with axial orientation (like a parachute) $\alpha _t$=90°. The Nishida 2005 results reported a coefficient of drag $C_d$ that increased non-linearly with attack angle from a minimum of 3.6 at $\alpha _t$=0 to a maximum of 5 at $\alpha _t$=90°. The steering angle of the thrust vector is substantially less than the attack angle deviation from 45° due to the interaction of the magnetic field with the solar wind. Torque increases from $\alpha _t$= 0° from zero at to a maximum at $\alpha _t$=45° and then decreases to zero at $\alpha _t$=90°. A number of magnetic sail design and other papers cite these results. In 2012 Kajimura reported simulation results that covered two cases where MHD applicability occurs with $r_g/L$=1.125 and where a kinematic model is applicable $r_g/L$=0.125 to compute a coefficient of drag $C_d$ and steering angle. As shown in Figure 4 of that paper when MHD applicability occurs the results are similar in form to Nishida 2005 where the largest $C_d$ occurs with the coil in an axial orientation. However, when the kinematic model applies, the largest $C_d$ occurs with the coil in a radial orientation. The steering angle is positive when MHD is applicable and negative when a kinematic model applies. The 2012 Nishida and Funaki published simulation results for a coefficient of drag $C_D$, coefficient of lift $C_L$ and a coefficient of moment $C_M$ for a coil radius of $R_c$=100 km and magnetopause radius $R_{mp}$=500 km at 1 AU.

=== Magnetic field model ===
In a design, either the magnetic field source strength or the magnetopause radius $R_{mp}\approx L$ the characteristic length must be chosen. A good approximation from Cattell and Toivanen for a magnetic field falloff rate $f_o, 1\leq f_o \leq3$ for a distance $R_0 \leq r \leq R_{mp}$ from the field source to magnetopause starts with the equation:

$B(r)\approx B(R_0)\biggl(\frac {R_0}{r}\biggr)^{f_o}$	MFM.1

where $B(R_0)$ is the magnetic field at a radius $R_0$ near the field source that falls off near the source as $1/r^3$ as follows:

$B(R_0) \approx C_{0} \frac {\mu_0\, \mathbf m }{4 \, \pi \, R_0^3}$	MFM.2

where $C_0$ is a constant multiplying the magnetic moment (A m^{2}) $\mathbf m$ to make $B(r)$ match a target value at $r>>R_0$. When far from the field source, a magnetic dipole is a good approximation and choosing the above value of $B(R_0)$ with $C_0$ =2 near the field source was used by Andrews and Zubrin.

The Amperian loop model for the magnetic moment is $\mathbf m = I_c S$, where $I_c$ is the current in amperes (A) and $S= \pi \, R_c^2$ is the surface area for a coil (loop) of radius $R_c$. Assuming that $R_0 \approx R_c$ and substituting the expression for the magnetic moment $\mathbf m$ into equation MFM.2 yields the following:

$I_c=\frac {4}{C_0 \mu_0} B(R_c) \, R_c$	MFM.3

When the magnetic field flux density $B(R_0)$ is specified, substituting $B_{mp}$ from the pressure balance analysis from equation MHD.2 into the above and solving for $R_{mp}$ yields the following:

$L \approx R_{mp} \approx R_0 \biggl(\frac {B(R_0)}{B_{mp} } \biggr)^{1/f_o}$	MFM.4

This is the expression for $L$ when $f_o=3$ with $C_{SO}=1/2$ and $C_{SO}=2$ and is the same form as the magnetopause distance of the Earth. Equation MFM.4 shows directly how a decreased falloff rate $f_o$ dramatically increases the effective sail area $S=\pi R_{mp}^2$ for a given field source magnetic moment $\mathbf m$ and $B_{mp}$ determined from the pressure balance equation MHD.1. Substituting this into equation MHD.3 yields the plasma wind force as a function of falloff rate $f_o$, plasma density $\rho$, coil radius $R_c \approx R_0$, coil current $I_c$ and plasma wind velocity $u$ as follows:

$F_w(f_o)=\frac {C_d}{2} \rho u^2 \, \pi \, R_0^2 \, \biggl(\frac {B(R_0)}{B_{mp} } \biggr)^{2/f_o} = \frac {C_d}{2} \rho u^2 \, \pi \, R_0^2 \, \biggl(\frac {\sqrt{\mu_0} I_c C_0}{4 R_0 \, u \sqrt{\rho \,C_{SO} } } \biggr)^{2/f_o}$	MFM.5

using equation MFM.3 for $B(R_0)$ and equation MHD.2 for $B_{mp}$. This is the same expression as equation (10b) when $f_o=3$ and $C_{SO}=1/2$ and the right hand side from equation (20) specifically applied to M2P2 with other numerical coefficients grouped into the $C_d$ term. Note that force increases as falloff rate decreases. For the solar wind case, substituting MHD.2 into MFM.5 and using the function for the solar wind plasma mass density $\rho_{sw}(a_\odot)=\rho_{sw}(1)/a_\odot ^2$, with $a_\odot$ the distance from the sun in Astronomical units (AU) results in the following expression:

$F_{sw}(f_o, a_\odot)=C_{f_o} \, ( \rho_{sw}(a_\odot) \, u^2))^ {1-1/f_o} \, R_0^2 \, S$	MFM.6

where $C_{f_o}= \frac {C_d}{2} \biggl(\frac {B(R_0)^2}{\mu_0 C_{SO}}\biggr)^{1/f_o} , \mathsf{and} \, S = \pi \, R_{mp}^2$, the effective sail blocking area.

This equation explicitly shows the relationship upon solar wind plasma mass density $\rho_{sw}(a_\odot)$ as a function of distance from the Sun $a_\odot$. For the case $f_o$=1 the expansion of the magnetopause radius $R_{mp}$ exactly matches the decreasing value of $\rho_{sw}(a_\odot)$ exactly as the distance from the Sun $a_\odot$ increases, resulting in constant force and hence constant acceleration inside the heliosphere. Note that $C_{f_o}$ includes the term $B(R_0)^{2/f_o}$, which means that as $f_o$ increases that the magnetic field near the field source $B(R_0)$ must increase to maintain the same force as compared with a smaller value of $f_o$. The example in the overview section set $C_{f_o}$=1, $u$=1, $R_0$=1, and $S$=1 so that the force at $a_\odot$=1 was equal to 1 for all values of $f_o$ at 1 AU.

=== General kinematic model ===
When the MHD applicability test of $r_g/L$ <1 then a kinematic simulation model more accurately predicts force transferred from the plasma wind to the spacecraft. In this case the effective sail blocking area $A_e$ < $S=\pi L^2$.

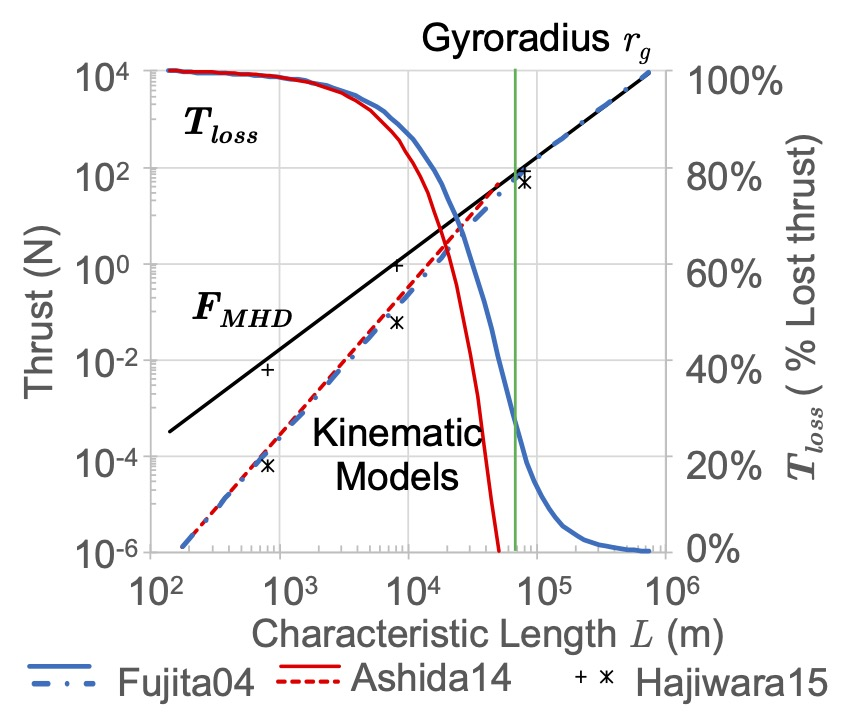
Magnetic dipole force: MHD and kinematic models

The left axis of the figure is for plots of magnetic sail force versus characteristic length $L$. The solid black line plots the MHD model force $F_{MHD}$ from equation MHD.3. The green line shows the value of ion gyroradius $r_g \approx$ 72 km at 1 AU from equation MHD.5. The dashed blue line plots the hybrid MHD/kinematic model from equation MHD.6 from Fujita04. The red dashed line plots a curve fit to simulation results from Ashida14. Although a good fit for these parameters, the curve fit range of this model does not cover some relevant examples. Additional simulation results from Hajiwara15 are shown for the MHD and kinematic model as single data points as indicated in the legend. These models are all in close agreement. The kinematic models predict less force than predicted by the MHD model. In other words, the fraction $T_{loss}$ of thrust force predicted by the MHD model is lost when $r_g/L<1$ as plotted on the right axis. The solid blue and red lines show $T_{loss}$ for Fujita04 and Ashida18 respectively, indicating that operation with $L$ less than 10% of $r_g$ will have significant loss. Other factors in a specific magnetic sail design may offset this loss for values of $L<r_g$.

=== Performance measures ===
Important measures that determine the relative performance of different magnetic sail systems include: mass of the field source generator and its power and energy requirements; thrust achieved; thrust to weight ratio, any limitations and constraints, and propellant system exhausted, if any. Mass of the field source $M_{fs}$ in the Magsail design was relatively large and subsequent designs strove to reduce this measure. Total spacecraft mass is $M_{sc}=M_{fs}+M_p$, where $M_p$ is the payload mass. Power requirements are significant in some designs and add to field source mass. Thrust is the plasma wind force $F_w$ for a particular plasma environment with acceleration $a=F_w/M_{sc}$. The thrust to weight ratio $F_w/M_{sc}$ is also an important performance measure. Other limitations and constraints may be specific to a particular design. The M2P2 and MPS designs, as well as potentially the plasma magnet design, exhaust some plasma as part of inflating the magnetospheric bubble and these cases also have a specific impulse and effective exhaust velocity performance measure.

== Proposed magnetic sail systems ==
This section contains a subsection for each of the proposed magnetic sail designs introduced in the summary. Each subsection begins with a high-level description of that design and an illustration. The cited references are technical and contain many equations, for which this article includes where applicable a common notation described in the Physical principles section, and in other cases the notation from a cited reference. The focus is to include equations used in the Performance comparison section. The subsections include plots of variables with relevant units related to this objective that are preceded by a summary description.

=== Magsail (MS) ===
Andrews was working on use of a magnetic scoop to gather interstellar material as propellant for a nuclear electric ion drive spacecraft, allowing the craft to operate in a similar manner to a Bussard ramjet, whose history goes back to at least 1973. Andrews asked Zubrin to help compute the magnetic scoop drag against the interplanetary medium, which turned out to be much greater than the ion drive thrust. The ion drive component of the system was dropped, and use of the concept of using the magnetic scoop as a magnetic sail or Magsail (MS) was born.

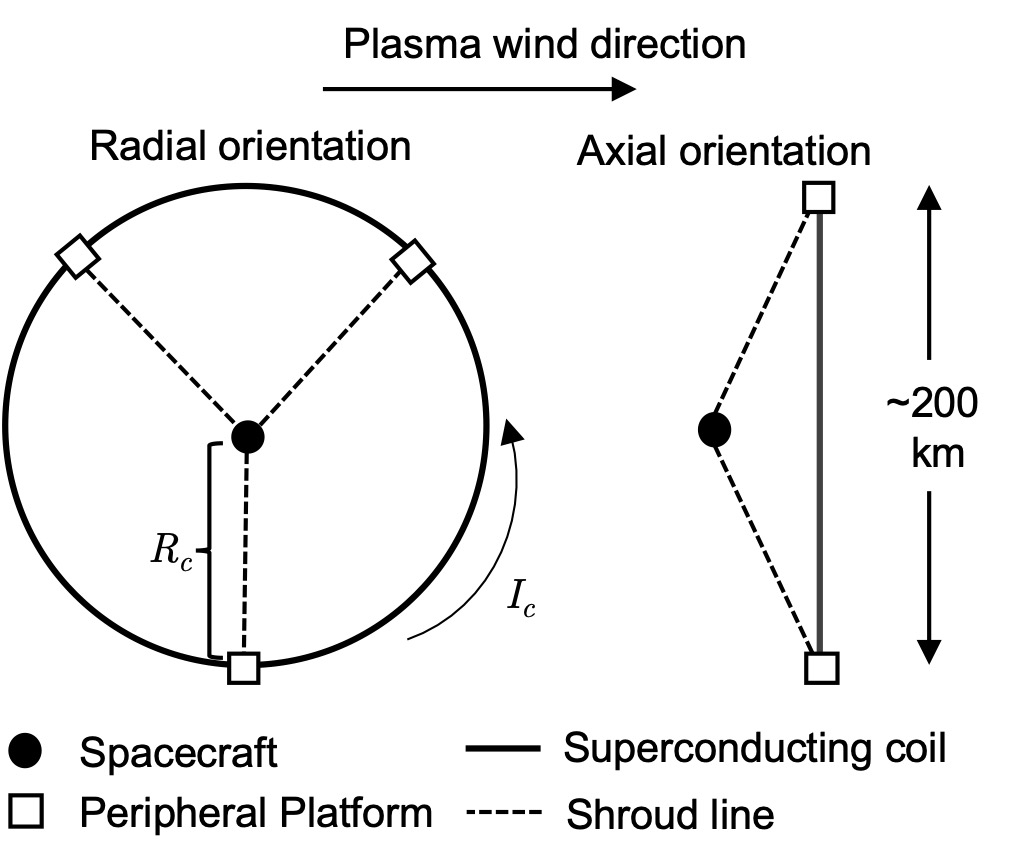
Andrews & Zubrin Magsail

The figure shows the magsail design consisting of a loop of superconducting wire of radius $R_c$ on the order of 100 km that carries a direct current $I_c$ that generates a magnetic field, which was modeled according to the Biot–Savart law inside the loop and as a magnetic dipole far outside the loop. With respect to the plasma wind direction a magsail may have a radial (or normal) orientation or an axial orientation that can be adjusted to provide torque for steering. In non-axial configurations lift is generated that can change the spacecraft's momentum. The loop connects via shroud lines (or tethers) to the spacecraft in the center. Because a loop carrying current is forced outwards towards a circular shape by its magnetic field, the sail could be deployed by unspooling the conductor wire and applying a current through it via the peripheral platforms. The loop must be adequately attached to the spacecraft in order to transfer momentum from the plasma wind and would pull the spacecraft behind it as shown in the axial configuration in the right side of the figure. This design has a significant advantage of requiring no propellant and is thus a form of propellantless propulsion that can operate indefinitely.

==== MHD model ====
Analysis of magsail performance was done using a simulation and a fluid (i.e., MHD) model with similar results observed for one case. The magnetic moment of a current loop (A m^{2}) is $\mathbf m= I_c \pi R_c^2$ for a current of $I_c$ A and a loop of radius $R_c$ m. Close to the loop, the magnetic field at a distance $z$ along the center-line axis perpendicular to the loop is derived from the Biot-Savart law as follows.

$$B_{cl} (z)=\frac {\mu_0 I_c R_c^2}{2(z^2 +R_c^2)^{3/2} }$$	MS.1

At a distance far from the loop center the magnetic field is approximately that produced by a magnetic dipole. The pressure at the magnetospheric boundary is doubled due to compression of the magnetic field and stated by the following equation at a point along the center-line axis or the target magnetopause standoff distance $L_Z$.

$p_{mb}=\frac {B_{cl}(0)^2}{2 \mu_0} \Biggl(\frac {R_c}{L_Z}\Biggr)^6$	MS.2

Equating this to the dynamic pressure for a plasma environment $p_{mb}=\rho \, u_{pe}^2 /2$, inserting $B_{cl}(0)$ from equation MS.1 and solving for $L_Z$ yields

$L_Z=1.26 \, C_Z, where \, \, C_Z = R_c \Biggl( \frac {B_{cl}(0)}{u_{pe} \sqrt{\rho \mu_0} } \Biggr)^{1/3}$	MS.3

Andrews and Zubrin derived the drag (thrust) force of the sail $F_D$ that determined the characteristic length $L_Z$ for a tilt angle, but according to Freeland an error was made in numerical integration in choosing the ellipse downstream from the magnetopause instead of the ellipse upstream that made those results optimistic by a factor of approximately 3.1, which should be used to correct any drag(thrust) force results using Instead, this article uses the approximation for a spherical bubble that corrects this error and is close to the analytical formula for the axial configuration as the force for the Magsail as follows

$F_{MS} = 1.214 \, \, \frac{\rho u_{pe}^2}{2} \pi \, L_Z^2$	MS.4

In 2004 Toivanen and Janhunen did further analysis on the Magsail that they called a Plasma Free MagnetoPause (PFMP) that produced similar results to that of Andrews and Zubrin.

==== Coil mass and current (CMC) ====
The minimum required mass to carry the current in equation MS.1 or other magnetic sail designs from Andres/Zubrin (9) and Crowl as follows:

$_{min}M_c \, = 2 \, \pi \, R_c \, I_c \, / (J _e/ \delta_c)$	CMC.1

where $J_e$ is the superconductor critical current density (A/m^{2}) and $\delta_c$ is the coil material density, for example $J_e$ = 1×10^{11} A/m^{2} and $\delta_c$ = 6,500 kg/m^{3} for a superconductor in Freeland The physical mass of the coil is

$_{phy}M_c= (2 \, \pi +N_{tether} ) \, R_c \, \pi \, r_c^2 \, \delta_c$	CMC.2

where $r_c$ is the radius of the superconductor wire, for example that necessary to handle the tension for a particular use case, such as deceleration in the ISM where $r_c$ = 10 mm. The $N_{tether}$ factor (e.g., 3) accounts for mass of the tether (or shroud) lines to connect the coil to a spacecraft. Note that $_{phy} M_c$ with $N_{tether}$=0 must be no less than $_{min}M_c$ in order for the coil to carry the superconductor critical current $I_{cc}=J_e \pi r_c^2$ amperes for a coil wire of radius $r_c$, for example $I_{cc}$ = 7,854 kiloampere (kA.)

Setting equation CMC.2 with $N_{tether}$=0 equal to equation CMC.1 and solving for $r_c$ yields the minimum required coil radius

$_{min} r_c =\sqrt{I_c/(J_e \pi)}$	CMC.3

If operated within the solar system, high temperature superconducting wire (HTS) is necessary to make the magsail practical since required current is large, millions of amperes. Protection from solar heating is necessary closer to the Sun, for example by highly reflective coatings. If operated in interstellar space low temperature superconductors (LTS) could be adequate since the temperature of a vacuum is 2.7 Kelvins (K), but radiation and other heat sources from the spacecraft may render LTS impractical. The critical current $I_{cc}$ of the HTS YBCO coated superconductor wire increases at lower temperatures with a current density $J_e$ of 6×10^{10} A/m^{2} at 77 K and 9×10^{11} A/m^{2} at 5 K.

==== Magsail kinematic model (MKM) ====
The MHD applicability test of equation MHD.5 fails in some ISM deceleration cases and a kinematic model is necessary, such as the one documented in 2017 by Claudius Gros summarized here. A spacecraft with an overall mass $m_{tot}$ and velocity $v$ follows of motion as:

$F_{MKM} = m_{tot}\dot{v} = -\left(A_G(v)n_pv\right)(2m_pv) = 2 \, \rho_{im} \, v^2 A_G(v),$	MKM.1

where $F_{MKM}$ N is force predicted by this model, $n_p$ m^{−3} is the proton number density, $m_p$ kg is the proton mass, $\rho = m_p n_p$ kg/m^{3} the plasma density, and $A_G(v)$ m^{2} the effective reflection area. This equation assumes that the spacecraft encounters $A_G(v) n_p v$ particles per second and that every particle of mass $m_p$ is completed reflected. Note that this equation is of the same form as MFM.5 with $C_d$=4, interpreting the $C_d$ term as just a number.

Gros numerically determined the effective reflection area $A_G(v)$ by integrating the degree of reflection of approaching protons interacting with the superconducting loop magnetic field according to the Biot-Savart law. The reported result was independent of the loop radius $R_c$. An accurate curve fit as reported in Figure 4 to the numerical evaluation for the effective reflection area for a magnetic sail in the axial configuration from equation (8) was

$A_G(v) = 0.081\pi R_c^2\left[ \log \left( \frac{cI}{v I_G } \right) \right]^3 \, \, , v/c< I/I_G$	MKM.2

where $\pi R_c^2$ is the area enclosed by the current carrying loop, $c$ the speed of light, and the value $I_G=1.55\cdot10^{6}$ A determined a good curve fit for $I$=10^{5} A, the current through the loop. In 2020, Perakis published an analysis that corroborated the above formula with parameters selected for the solar wind and reported a force no more than 9% less than the Gros model for $I$=10^{5} A and $R_c$=100 m with the coil in an axial orientation.. That analysis also reported on the effect of magsail tilt angle on lift and side forces for a use case in maneuvering within the solar system.

For comparison purposes, the effective sail area determined for the magsail by Zubrin from equation MS.3 with the 3.1 correction factor from Freeland applied and using the same velocity value (resolving the discrepancy noted by Gros) as follows:

$A_Z(v) = \frac {1.124 \times 1.26} {3.1} \,L_Z$	MKM.3

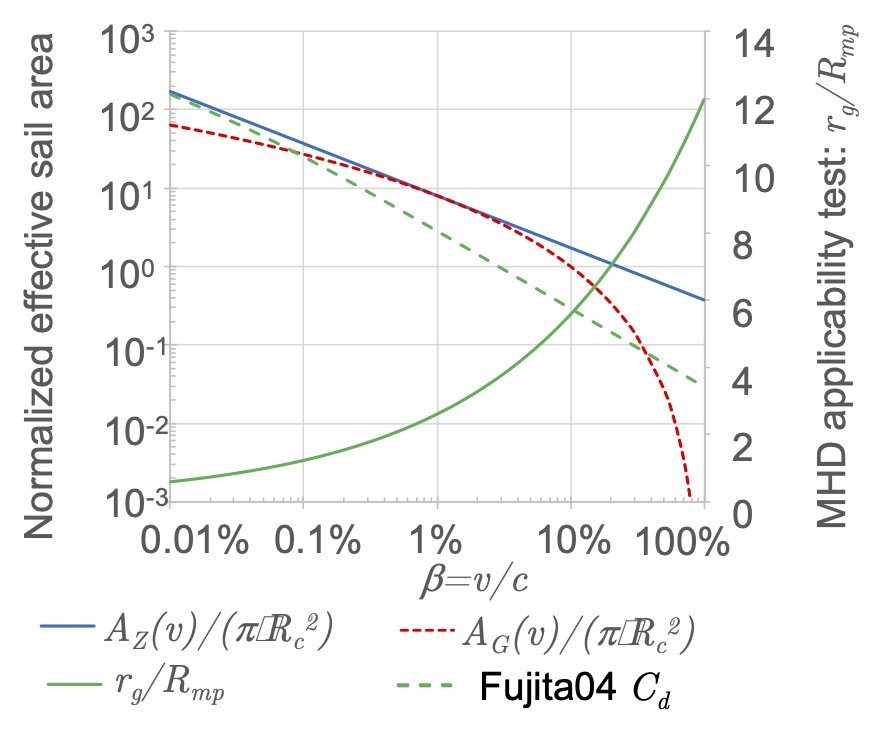
Magsail MHD and kinematic model effective sail area

The figure shows the normalized effective sail area normalized by the coil area $\pi R_c^2$ for the MKM case from Gros of equation MKM.1 and for Zubrin from equation MKM.3 for $I \approx I_G$, $R_c$=100 km, and $n_p$=0.1 cm^{−3} for the G-cloud on approach to Alpha Centauri corresponding to ISM density $\rho_{im}=1.67\times10^{-22}$ kg/m^{3} consistent with that from Freeland plotted versus the spacecraft velocity relative to the speed of light $\beta =v/c$. A good fit occurs for these parameters, but for different values of $R_c$ and $I$ the fit can vary significantly. Also plotted is the MHD applicability test of ion gyroradius divided by magnetopause radius $r_g/R_{mp}$ <1 from equation MHD.4 on the secondary axis. Note that MHD applicability occurs at $v/c$ < 1%. For comparison, the 2004 Fujita $C_d$ as a function of $r_g/R_{mp}$ from the MHD applicability test section is also plotted. Note that the Gros model predicts a more rapid decrease in effective area than this model at higher velocities. The normalized values of $A_G(v)$ and $A_Z(v)$ track closely until $\beta = v/c \approx$ 10% after which point the Zubrin magsail model of Equation MS.4 becomes increasingly optimistic and equation MKM.2 is applicable instead. Since the models track closely up to $\beta \approx$ 10%, with the kinematic model underestimating effective sail area for smaller values of $\beta$ (hence underestimating force), equation MKM.1 is an approximation for both the MHD and kinematic region. The Gros model is pessimistic for $\beta$ < 0.1%.

Gros used the analytic expression for the effective reflection area $A_G(v)$ from equation MKM.3 for explicit solution for the required distance $x_f$ m to decelerate to final velocity $v_f \approx 0.013 c$ m/s from given an initial velocity $v_0$ m/s for a spacecraft mass $m_{tot}$ kg as follows:

$x_{f}= \frac {m_{tot} \, [g(v_0)-g(v_f)] }{0,081 \, m_p \, n_p \pi \, R_c^2}$	MKM.4

where $g(v)=ln^{-2}(\frac {v \, I_G}{c \, I})$. When $v_f$=0 the above equation is defined in as $x_{max}$, which enabled a closed form solution of the velocity at a distance $x, v(x)$ in with numerical integration required to compute the time required to decelerate. Equation (16) The optimal current that minimized $x_{max}$ as $I_{opt}=e \beta_0 I_G$ where $\beta_0=v_0/c$. In 2017 Crowl optimized coil current for the ratio of effective area $A(v)$ over total mass $m_{tot}$ and derived the result $I_{opt}=e^3 \, \beta_0 I_G$. That paper used results from Gros for the stopping distance $x_{max}$ and time to decelerate.

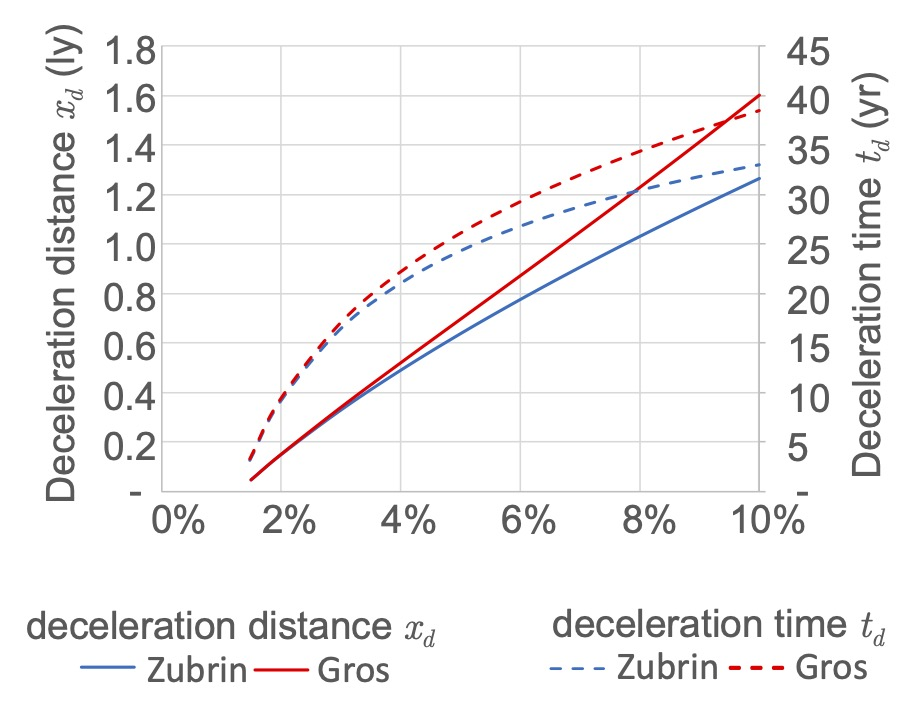
Magsail ISM deceleration distance and time comparison

The figure plots the distance traveled while decelerating $x_d$ and time required to decelerate $t_d$ given a starting relative velocity $\beta_0 = v_0/c$ and a final velocity $v_f=0.013 c$ m/s consistent with that from Freeland for the same parameters above. Equation CMC.1 gives the magsail mass $M_s$ as 97 tonnes assuming payload mass $M_p$ of 100 tonnes using the same values used by Freeland of $J_e$ = 10^{11} A/m^{2} and $\delta_c$=6,500 kg/m^{3} for the superconducting coil. Equation MS.4 gives Force for the magsail multiplied by $C_d$=4 for the Andrews/Zubrin model to align with equation MHD.3 definition of force from the Gros model. Acceleration is force divided by mass, velocity is the integral of acceleration over the deceleration time interval $t_d$ and deceleration distance traveled $x_d$ is the integral of the velocity over $t_d$. Numerical integration resulted in the lines plotted in the figure with deceleration distance traveled plotted on the primary vertical axis on the left and time required to decelerate on the secondary vertical axis on the right. Note that the MHD Zubrin model and the Gros kinematic model predict nearly identical values of deceleration distance up to $\beta_0$~ 5% of c, with the Zubrin model predicting less deceleration distance and shorter deceleration time at greater values of $\beta_0$. This is consistent with the Gros model predicting a smaller effective area $A(v)$ at larger values of $\beta_0$. The value of the closed form solution for deceleration distance $x_f$ from MKM.4 for the same parameters closely tracks the numerical integration result.

==== Specific designs and mission profiles ====
Dana Andrews and Robert Zubrin first proposed the magnetic sail concept in 1988 for interstellar travel for acceleration by a fusion rocket, coasting and then deceleration via a magsail at the destination that could reduce flight times by 40–50 years In 1989 details for interplanetary travel were reported In 1990 Andrews and Zubrin reported on an example for solar wind parameters one AU away from the Sun, with $n_i = 5 \times 10^{6}$ m^{−3} with only protons as ions, apparent wind velocity $u_{sw}$=500 km/s the field strength required to resist the dynamic pressure of the solar wind is 50 nT from equation MHD.2. With radius $R_c$=100 km and magnetospheric bubble of $L$=500 km (310 mi) reported a thrust of 1980 newtons and a coil mass of 500 tonnes. For the above parameters with the correction factor of 3.1 applied to equation MS.4 yields the same thrust and equation CMC.1 yields the same coil mass. Results for another 4 solar wind cases were reported, but the MHD applicability test of equation MHD.5 fails in these cases.

In 2015, Freeland documented a use case with acceleration away from Earth by a fusion drive with a magsail used for interstellar deceleration on approach to Alpha Centaturi as part of a study to update Project Icarus with $R_c$=260 km, an initial $R_{mp}$ of 1,320 km and ISM density $\rho_{im}=1.67\times10^{-22}$ kg/m^{3}, almost identical to the n(H I) measurement of 0.098 cm^{−3} by Gry in 2014. The Freeland study predicted deceleration from 5% of light speed in approximately 19 years. The coil parameters $J_e$=10^{11} A/m^{2}, $r_{sc}$= 5 mm, $\rho_{sc}$=6,500 kg/m^{3}, resulted in an estimated coil mass of $M_c(phy)$=1,232 tonnes. Although the critical current density $J_e$ was based upon a 2000 Zubrin NIAC report projecting values through 2020, the assumed value is close to that for commercially produced YBCO coated superconductor wire in 2020. The mass estimate may be optimistic since it assumed that the entire coil carrying mass is superconducting while 2020 manufacturing techniques place a thin film on a non-superconducting substrate. For the interstellar medium plasma density $\rho_{im}$=1.67×10^{−22} with an apparent wind velocity 5% of light speed, the ion gyroradius is 570 km and thus the design value for $R_{mp}$ meets the MHD applicability test of equation MHD.5. Equation MFM.3 gives the required coil current as $I_c$~7,800 kA and from equation CMC.1 $M_c(min)$= 338 tonnes; however, but the corresponding superconducting wire minimum radius from equation CMC.3 is $r_c(min)$ =1 mm, which would be insufficient to handle the decelerating thrust force of $F_{MS}$ ~ 100,000 N predicted by equation MS.4 and hence the design specified $r_{sc}$= 5 mm to meet structural requirements. In a complete design, the mass of infrastructure, including coil shielding to maintain critical temperature and survive abrasion in outer space, must also be included. Appendix A estimates these as 90 tonnes for wire shielding and 50 tonnes for the spools and other magsail infrastructure. Freeland compared this magsail deceleration design with one where both acceleration and deceleration were performed by a fusion engine and reported that the mass of such a "dirty Icarus" design was over twice that of a magsail used for deceleration. An Icarus design published in 2020 used a Z-pinch fusion drive in an approach called Firefly that dramatically reduced mass of the fusion drive and made fusion only drive performance for acceleration and deceleration comparable to the fusion for acceleration and magsail for deceleration design.

In 2017, Gros reported numerical examples for the Magsail kinematic model that used different parameters and coil mass models than those used by Freeland. That paper assumed hydrogen ion (H I) number densities of 0.05-0.2 cm^{−3} (9×10^{−23} - 3×10^{−22} kg/m^{3}) for the warm local clouds and about 0.005 cm^{−3} (9×10^{−23} kg/m^{3}) for voids of the local bubble. Patches of cold interstellar clouds with less than 200 AU may have large densities of neutral hydrogen up to 3000 cm^{−3}, which would not respond to a magnetic field. For a high speed mission to Alpha Centauri with initial velocity before deceleration $v_0=c/10$ using a coil mass of 1500 tons and a coil radius of $R$=1600 km, the estimated stopping distance $x_{max}$ was 0.37 light years and the total travel time of 58 years with 1/3 of that being deceleration.

In 2017, Crowl documented a design for a mission starting near the Sun and destined for Planet nine approximately 1,000 AU distant that employed the Magsail kinematic model. The design accounted for the Sun's gravity as well as the impact of elevated temperature on the superconducting coil, composed of meta-stable metallic hydrogen, which has a mass density of 3,500 kg/m^{3} about half that of other superconductors. The mission profile used the Magsail to accelerate away from 0.25 to 1.0 AU from the Sun and then used the Magsail to brake against the Local ISM on approach to Planet nine for a total travel time of 29 years. Parameters and coil mass models differ from those used by Freeland.

Another mission profile uses a magsail oriented at an attack angle to achieve heliocentric transfer between planets moving away from or toward the Sun. In 2013 Quarta and others used Kajimura 2012 simulation results that described the lift (steering angle) and torque to achieve a Venus to Earth transfer orbit of 380 days with a coil radius of $R_c$~1 km with characteristic acceleration $a_c$=1 mm/s^{2}. In 2019 Bassetto and others used the Quarta "thick" magnetopause model and predicted a Venus to Earth transfer orbit of approximately 8 years for a coil radius of $R_c$~1 km. with characteristic acceleration $a_c$=0.1 mm/s^{2}. In 2020 Perakis used the Magsail kinematic model with a coil radius of $R_c$=350 m, current $I_c$=10^{4} A and spacecraft mass of 600 kg that changed attack angle to accelerate away from the Earth orbit and decelerate to Jupiter orbit within 20 years.

=== Mini-magnetospheric plasma propulsion (M2P2) ===
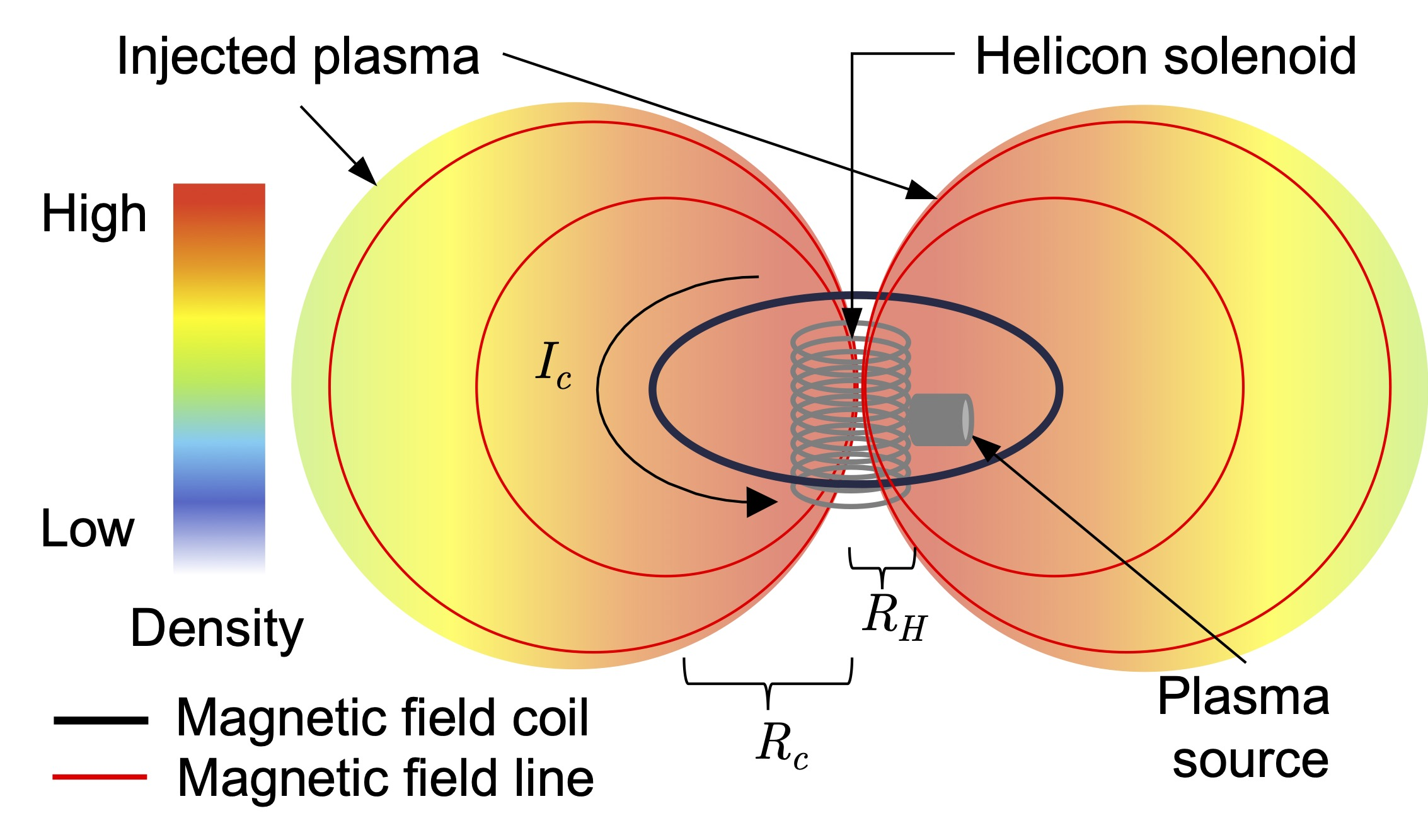
Winglee M2P2 schematic

In 2000, Winglee, Slough and others proposed a design order to reduce the size and weight of a magnetic sail well below that of the magsail and named it mini-magnetospheric plasma propulsion (M2P2) that reported results adapted from a simulation model of the Earth's magnetosphere. The calculates speeds of 50 to 80 km s−1 could enable spacecraft:

- To travel out of the solar system
- To travel between the planets for low power requirements of ~1 kW per 100 kg of payload and ~0.5 kg fuel consumption per day for acceleration periods of several days to a few weeks.

The figure based upon Winglee, Hajiwara, Arita, and Funaki illustrates the M2P2 design, which was the basis of the subsequent Magneto plasma sail (MPS) design. Starting at the center with a solenoid coil of radius $R_H$ of $N_t$=1,000 turns carrying a radio frequency current that generates a helicon wave that injects plasma fed from a source into a coil of radius $R_c$ that carries a current of $I_c$, which generates a magnetic field. The excited injected plasma enhances the magnetic field and generates a miniature magnetosphere around the spacecraft, analogous to the heliopause where the Sun injected plasma encounters the interstellar medium, coronal mass ejections or the Earth's magnetotail. The injected plasma created an environment that analysis and simulations showed had a magnetic field with a falloff rate of $1/r$ as compared with the classical model of a $1/r^3$ falloff rate, making the much smaller coil significantly more effective based upon analysis and simulation. The pressure of the inflated plasma along with the stronger magnetic field pressure at a larger distance due to the lower falloff rate would stretch the magnetic field and more efficiently inflate a magnetospheric bubble around the spacecraft.

Parameters for the coil and solenoid were $R_H$=2.5 cm and for the coil $R_c$= 0.1 m, 6 orders of magnitude less than the magsail coil with correspondingly much lower mass. An estimate for the weight of the coil was 10 kg and 40 kg for the plasma injection source and other infrastructure. Reported results from Figure 2 were $B_0 \approx$ ×10^{−3} T at $R_{mp} \approx$ 10 km and from Figure 3 an extrapolated result with a plasma injection jet force $F_{jet} \approx$10^{−3} N resulting in a thrust force of $F_{M2P2} \approx$ 1 N. The magnetic-only sail force from equation MHD.3 is $F_w$=3×10^{−11} N and thus M2P2 reported a thrust gain of 4×10^{10} as compared with a magnetic field only design. Since M2P2 injects ionized gas at a $m_{in}$ mass flow rate (kg/s) it is viewed as a propellant and therefore has a specific impulse (s) $I_{sp}=F_{M2P2}/m_{in}/g_0$ where $g_0$ is the acceleration of Earth's gravity. Winglee stated $m_{in}$=0.5 kg/day and therefore $I_{sp}$=17,621. The equivalent exhaust velocity $v_e=g_0 \, I_{sp}$ is 173 km/s for 1 N of thrust force. Winglee assumed total propellant mass of 30 kg and therefore propellant would run out in 60 days.

In 2003, Khazanov published MagnetoHydroDynamic (MHD) and kinetic studies that confirmed some aspects of M2P2 but raised issues that the sail size was too small, and that very small thrust would result and also concluded that the hypothesized $1/r$ magnetic field falloff rate was closer to $1/r^2$. The plasma density plots from Khazanov indicated a relatively high density inside the magnetospheric bubble as compared with the external solar wind region that differed significantly from those published by Winglee where the density inside the magnetospheric bubble was much less than outside in the external solar wind region.

A detailed analysis by Toivanen and others in 2004 compared a theoretical model of Magsail, dubbed Plasma-free Magnetospheric Propulsion (PFMP) versus M2P2 and concluded that the thrust force predicted by Winglee and others was over ten orders of magnitude optimistic since the majority of the solar wind momentum was delivered to the magnetotail and current leakages through the magnetopause and not to the spacecraft. Their comments also indicated that the magnetic field lines may not close near enough to the coil to achieve significant transfer of force. Their analysis made an analogy to the Heliospheric current sheet as an example in astrophysics where the magnetic field could falloff at a rate of between $1/r$ and $1/r^2$. They also analyzed current sheets reported by Winglee from the magnetopause to the spacecraft in the windward direction and a current sheet in the magnetotail. Their analysis indicated that the current sheets needed to pass extremely close to the spacecraft to impart significant force could generate significant heat and render this leverage impractical.

In 2005, Cattell and others published comments regarding M2P2 that included a lack of magnetic flux conservation in the region outside the magnetosphere that was not considered in the Khazanov studies. Their analysis concluded in Table 1 that Winglee had significantly underestimated the required sail size, mass, and required magnetic flux. Their analysis asserted that the hypothesized $1/r$ magnetic field falloff rate was not possible.

The expansion of the magnetic field using injected plasma was demonstrated in a large vacuum chamber on Earth, but quantification of thrust was not part of the experiment. The accompanying presentation has some good animations that illustrate physical principles described in the report. A 2004 Winglee paper focused on usage of M2P2 for electromagnetic shielding. Beginning in 2003, the Magneto plasma sail design further investigated the plasma injection augmentation of the magnetic field, used larger coils and reported significantly more modest gains.

=== Magnetoplasma sail (MPS) ===
In 2003 Funaki and others proposed an approach similar to the M2P2 design and called it the MagnetoPlasma Sail (MPS) that started with a coil $R_c$=0.2 m and a magnetic field falloff rate of $f_o$=1.52 with injected plasma creating an effective sail radius of $L$=26 km and assumed a conversion efficiency that transferred a fraction of the solar wind momentum to the spacecraft. Simulation results indicated a significant increase in magnetosphere size with plasma injection as compared to the Magsail design, which had no plasma injection. Analysis showed how adjustment of the MPS steering angle created force that could reach the outer planets. A satellite trial was proposed. Preliminary performance results were reported but later modified in subsequent papers.

Many MPS papers have been published on the magnetic sail contributing to the understanding of general physical principles of an artificial magnetosphere, its magnetohydrodynamic model, and the design approach for computing the magnetopause distance for a given magnetic field source are documented in the linked sections of this article.

In 2004 Funaki and others analyzed MPS cases where $R_c$=10 m and $R_c$=100 m as summarized in Table 2 predicting a characteristic length $L$ of 50 and 450 km producing significant thrust with mass substantially less than the Magsail and hence significant acceleration. This paper detailed the MHD applicability test of equation MHD.5 that the characteristic length must be greater than the ion gyroradius $r_g$ to effectively transfer solar wind momentum to the spacecraft. In 2005 Yamakawa and others further described a potential trial.

An analogy with the Earth's magnetosphere and magnetopause in determining the penetration of plasma irregularities into the magnetopause defines the key parameter of a local kinetic plasma beta as the ratio of the dynamic pressure $p_{dyn}$ of the injected plasma over the magnetic pressure $p_{dyn}$ as follows

$\beta_k = \frac {p_{dyn} }{p_{mag} }= \frac {\rho_{l} u_{l}^2}{B_{l} ^2 /\mu_0}$	MPS.1

where $\rho_l$ kg/m^{3} is the local plasma density, $u_l$ m/s is the local velocity of the plasma and $B_l$ T is the local magnetic field flux density. Simulations have shown that the kinetic beta is smallest near the field source, at magnetopause and the bow shock.

The kinetic $\beta_k$ differs from the thermal plasma beta $\beta_i=p_{plasma}/p_{mag}$ which is the ratio of the plasma thermal pressure to the magnetic pressure, with terms: $p_{plasma}=n \, k_B \,T$ is the plasma pressure with $n$ the number density, $k_B$ the Boltzmann constant and $T$ the ion temperature; and $p_{mag} = B^2/(2 \mu_0)$ the magnetic pressure for magnetic field flux density $B$ and $\mu_0$ vacuum permeability. In the context of the MPS, $\beta_k$ determines the propensity of the injected plasma flow to stretch the magnetic field while $\beta_i$ specifies the relative energy of the injected plasma.

In 2005 Funaki and others published numerical analysis showing $f_0$=1.88 for $\beta_k$=0.1. In 2009 Kajimura published simulation results with $\beta_k$=5 and $\beta_i$ ranging from 6 to 20 that the magnetic field falloff rate $f_0$ with argon and xenon plasma injected into the polar region was $f_0$=2.1 and with argon plasma injected into the equatorial region was $f_0$=1.8.

If $\beta_k>1$ then the Injection of a high-velocity, high-density plasma into a magnetosphere as proposed in M2P2 freezes the motion of a magnetic field into the plasma flow and was believed to inflate the magnetosphere. However experiments and numerical analysis determined that the solar wind cannot compress the magnetosphere and momentum transfer to the spacecraft is limited since momentum is transferred to injected plasma flowing out of the magnetosphere, similar to another criticism of M2P2.

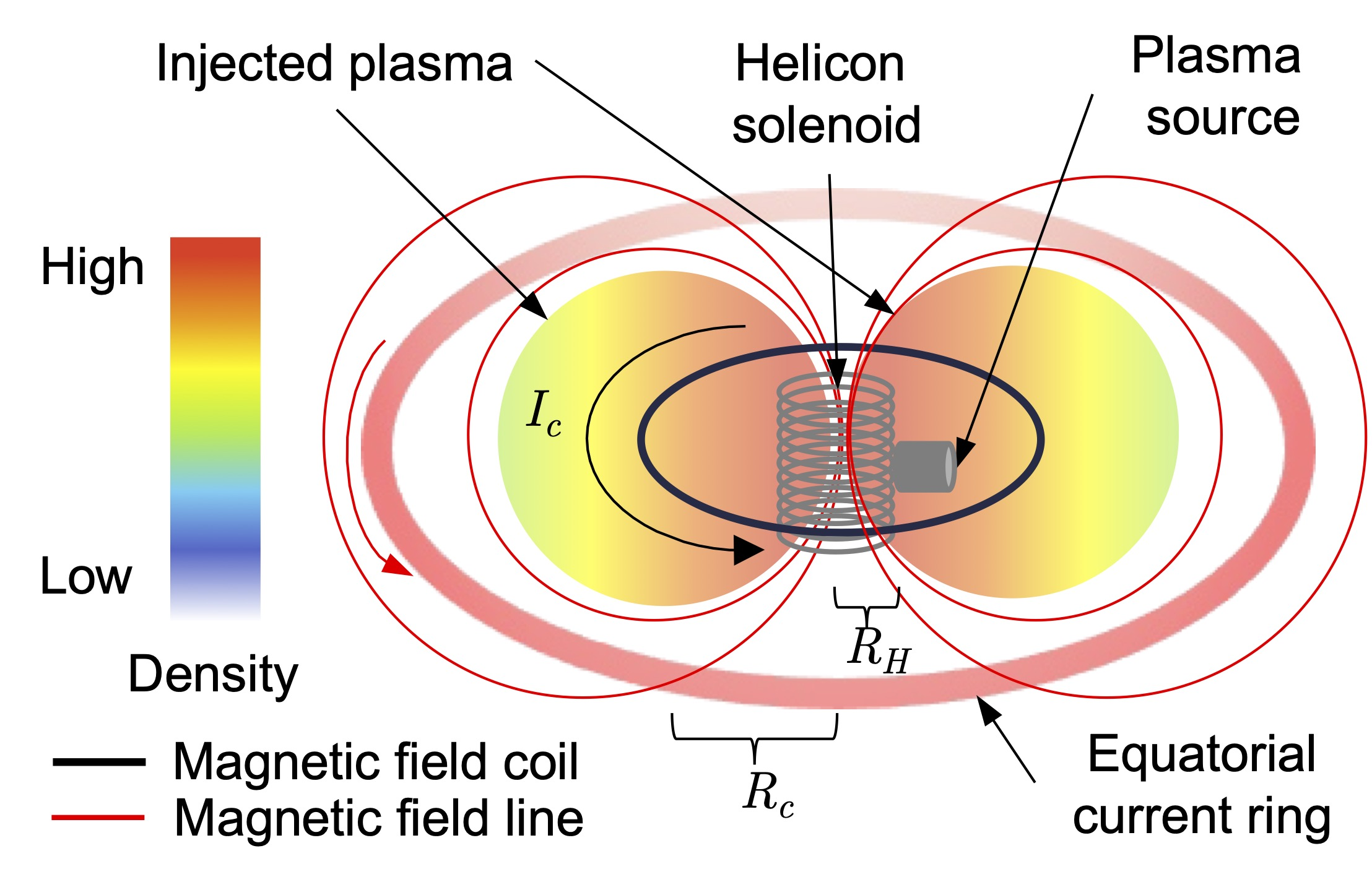
Magnetoplasma sail (MPS) schematic

An alternative is to reduce the plasma injection velocity and density to result in $\beta_k<1$ to achieve a plasma in equilibrium with the inflated magnetic field and therefore induce an equatorial diamagnetic current in the same direction as the coil current as shown in the figure, thereby increasing the magnetic moment of the MPS field source and consequently increasing thrust. In 2013 Funaki and others published simulation and theoretical results regarding how characteristics of the injected plasma affected thrust gain through creation of an equatorial ring current. They defined thrust gain for MPS as $G_{MPS}=F_{MPS}/F_{mag}$: the ratio of the force generated by low beta plasma injection $F_{MPS}$ divided by that of a pure magnetic sail $F_{mag}$ from equation MFM.5 with $f_o =3$ and $C_{SO}=0.5$ for $r_g\leq L$ or from equation GKM.1 for $r_g>L$. They reported $G_{MPS}$ of approximately 40 for magnetospheres less than the MHD applicability test and 3.77 for a larger magnetosphere where MHD applicability occurred, larger than values reported in 2012 of 20 and 3.3, respectively. Simulations revealed that optimum thrust gain occurred for $\beta_k<1$ and $\beta_i \approx 10$.

In 2014 Arita, Nishida and Funaki published simulation results indicating that plasma injection created an equatorial ring current and that the plasma injection rate had a significant impact on thrust performance, with the lowest value simulated having the best performance of a thrust gain $G_{MPS}$ of 3.77 with $\beta_i \approx 25$. They also reported that MPS increased the height of the magnetosphere by a factor of 2.6, which is important since it increases the effective sail blocking area.

In 2014 Ashida and others documented Particle In Cell (PIC) simulation results for a kinematic model for cases where $r_g >> L$ where MHD is not applicable. Equation (12) of their study included the additional force of the injected plasma jet $F_{jet}$ consisting of momentum and static pressure of ions and electrons and defined thrust gain as $F_{MPS}/(F_{mag}+F_{jet})$, which differs from the definition of a term by the same name in other studies. It represents the gain of MPS over that of simply adding the magnetic sail force and the plasma injection jet force. For the values cited in the conclusion, $F_{MPS}/F_{mag}$ is 7.5 in the radial orientation.

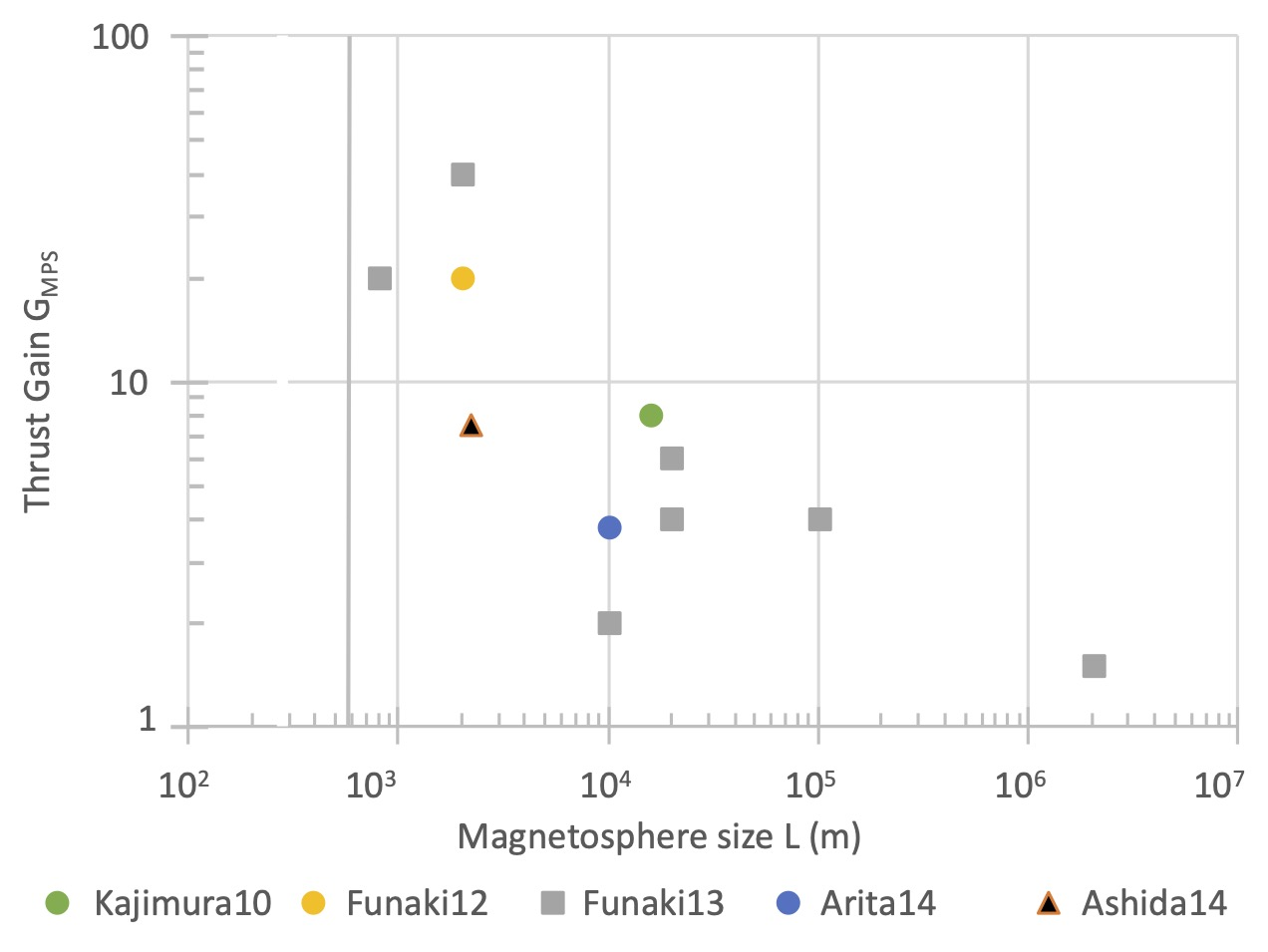
Summary of MPS thrust gain results

Since a number of results were published by different authors at different times, the figure summarizes the reported thrust gain $G_{MPS}$ versus magnetosphere size (or characteristic length $L$) with the source indicated in the legend as follows for simulation results Arita14, Ashida14, Funaki13, and Kajimura10. Simulation results require significant compute time, for example it took 1024 CPUs 4 days to simulate the simplest case and 4096 CPUs one week to simulate a more complex case. A thrust gain between 2 and 10 is common with the larger gains with a magnetic nozzle injecting plasma in one direction in opposition to the solar wind. The MHD applicability test of equation MHD.5 for the solar wind is $L \approx$72 km. Therefore, the estimated force of the MPS is that of equation MHD.3 multiplied by the empirically determined thrust gain $G_{MPS}$ from the figure multiplied by the percentage thrust loss $T_{loss}$ from equation MHD.6

$F_{MPS}= G_{MPS} \, (1-T_{loss}) \, C_d\ \rho \frac{u^2}{2} \pi L^2, \, \, r_g \le L$	MPS.2

For example, using solar wind parameters $\rho$=8×10^{−21} kg/m^{3} and $u$=500 km/s then $r_g$=72 km and $B_{mp}$=4×10^{−8} T. With $L$=10^{5} m for $f_o$=3 then $r_g < L$ and $T_{loss}\approx$ 11% from equation MHD.6. The magnetic field only force with a coil radius of $R_c$=6,300 m and coil current $I_c$=1.6×10^{6} A yields $B_0$=1.6×10^{−4} T from equation MFM.2 and with $C_d$=5 the magnetic force only is 175 N from equation MFM.5. Determining $G_{MPS} \approx$4 from the figure at $L$=10^{5} m as the multiplier for the magnetic-only force then the MPS force $F_{MPS} \approx$700 N.

Since MPS injects ionized gas at a rate of $m_{in}$ that can be viewed as a propellant it has a specific impulse $I_{sp}=F_{MPS}/m_{in}/g_0$ where $g_0$ is the acceleration of Earth's gravity. Funaki and Arita stated $m_{in}$=0.31 kg/day. Therefore $I_{sp}$=28,325 s per newton of thrust force. The equivalent exhaust velocity $v_e=g_0 \, I_{sp}$ is 278 km/s per newton of thrust force.

In 2015 Kajimura and others published simulation results for thrust performance with plasma injected by a magnetic nozzle, a technology used in VASIMR. They reported a thrust gain $G_{MPS}$ of 24 when the ion gyroradius $r_g$ (see equation MHD.5) was comparable to the characteristic length $L$, at the boundary of the MHD applicability test. The optimal result occurred with a thermal $\beta_i \approx 1$ with some decrease for higher values of thermal beta.

In 2015 Hagiwara and Kajimura published experimental thrust performance test results with plasma injection using a magnetoplasmadynamic thruster (aka MPD thruster or MPD Arcjet) in a single direction opposite the solar wind direction and a coil with the axial orientation. This meant that $F_{jet}$ provided additional propulsive force. Density plots explicitly show the increased plasma density upwind of the bow shock originating from the MPD thruster. They reported that $F_{MPS}>>F_{mag}+F_{jet}$ showing how MPS inflated the magnetic field to create more thrust than the magnetic sail alone plus that of the <<text gap here>>. The conclusion of the experiment was that the thrust gain $G_{MPS}$ was approximately 12 for a scaled characteristic length of $L$ = 60 km. In the above figure, note the significant improvement in thrust gain at $L$ = 60 km.as compared with only plasma injection.

In this example, using solar wind parameters $\rho$=8×10^{−21} kg/m^{3} and $u$=500 km/s then $r_g$=72 km and $B_{mp}$=4×10^{−8} T. With $L$=60 km for $f_o$=3 then $r_g \approx L$ and $T_{loss}\approx$ 28% from equation MHD.6. The magnetic field only force with a coil radius of $R_c$=2,900 m and coil current $I_c$=1.6×10^{6} A yields $B_0$=3.5×10^{−4} T from equation MFM.2 and with $C_d$=5 the magnetic force only is 51 N from equation MFM.5. Given $G_{MPS}$=12 as the multiplier for the magnetic only force then the MPS force $F_{MPS} \approx$611 N.

In 2017 Ueno published a design proposing use of multiple coils to generate a more complex magnetic field to increase thrust production. In 2020 Murayama and others published additional experimental results for a multi-pole MPD thruster. In 2017 Djojodihardjo published a conceptual design using MPS for a small (~500 kg) Earth observation satellite.

In 2020 Peng and others published MHD simulation results for a magnetic dipole with plasma injection operating in Low Earth orbit at 500 km within the Earth's Ionosphere where the ion number density is approximately 10^{11} m^{−3}. As reported in Figure 3, the magnetic field strength initially falls off as 1/r and then approaches 1/r^{2} at larger distances from the dipole. The radius of the artificial mini-magnetosphere could extend up to 200 m for this scenario. They reported that the injected plasma reduced magnetic field fall off rate and created of a drift current, similar to earlier reported MPS results for the solar wind.

=== Plasma magnet (PM) ===
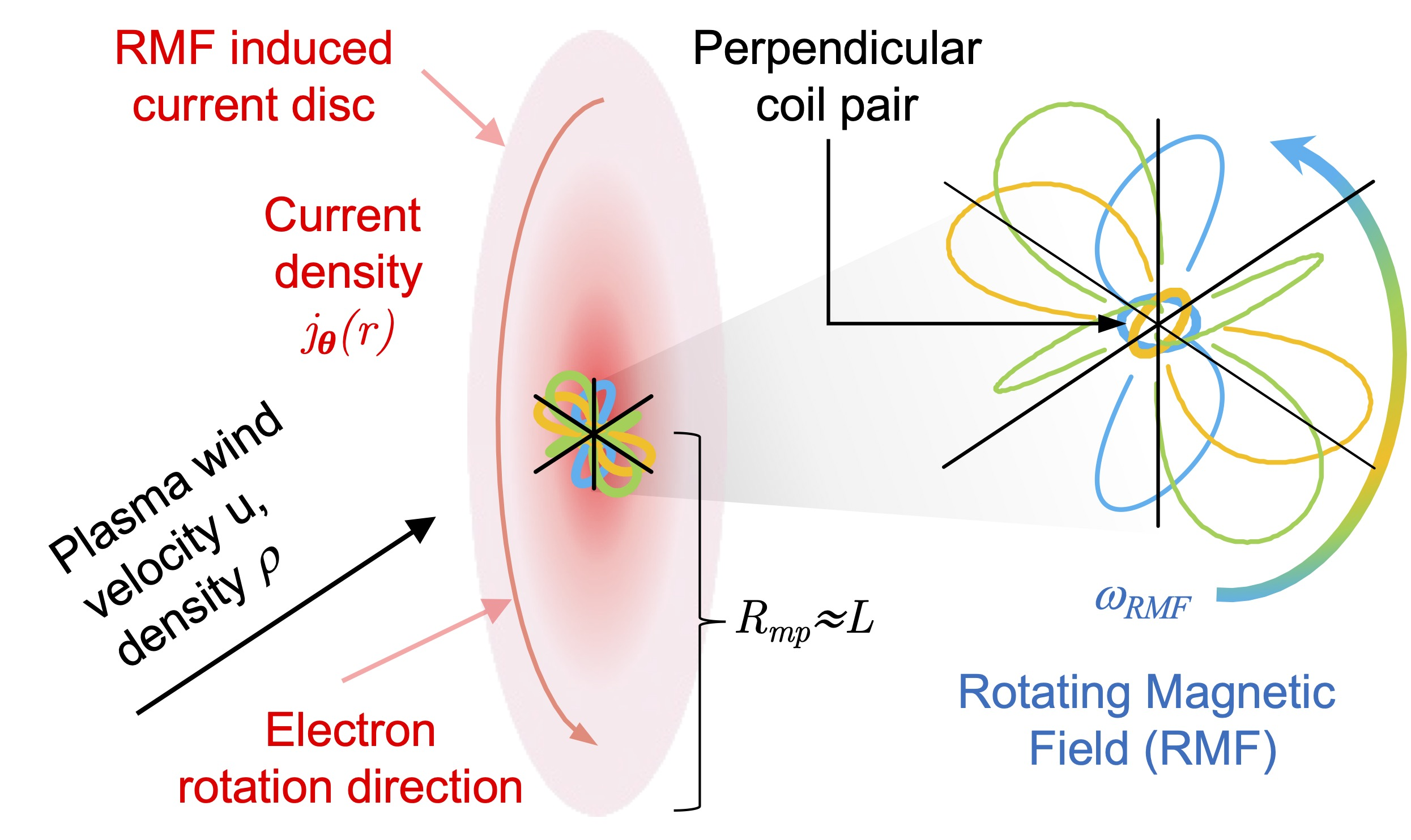
Plasma magnet principles of operation

The plasma magnet (PM) sail design introduced a different approach to generate a static magnetic dipole as illustrated in the figure. As shown in the detailed view on the right the field source is two relatively small crossed perpendicularly oriented antenna coils each of radius $R_c$ (m), each carrying a sinusoidal alternating current (AC) with the total current of $I_c$ (A) generated by an onboard power supply. The AC current applied to each coil is out of phase by 90° and consequently generates a rotating magnetic field (RMF) with rotational frequency (s^{−1}) $\omega_{RMF}$ chosen that is fast enough that positive ions do not rotate but the less massive electrons rotate at this speed. The figure illustrates rotation using color coded contours of constant magnetic strength, not magnetic field lines. In order to inflate the magnetospheric bubble the thermal plasma beta $\beta_t$ must be high and initially a plasma injection may be necessary, analogous to inflating a balloon when small and internal tension is high. After initial inflation, protons and rotating electrons are captured from the plasma wind through the leaky magnetopause and as shown in the left create a current disc shown as transparent red in the figure with darker shading indicating greatest density near the coil pair and extending out to the magnetopause radius R_{mp}, which is orders of magnitude larger than the coil radius R_{c} (figure not drawn to scale). See RMDCartoon.avi for an animation of this effect. The induced current disc carries a direct current $I_{cd}$ orders of magnitude larger than the input alternating current $I_c$ and forms a static dipole magnetic field oriented perpendicular to the current disc reaching a standoff balance with the plasma wind pressure at distance $R_{mp} \approx L$ at the magnetopause boundary according to the MHD model of an artificial magnetosphere.

The magnetic field falloff rate was assumed in 2001 and 2006 to be $f_o$ =1. However, as described by Khazanov in 2003 and restated by Slough, Kirtley and Pancotti in 2011 and Kirtley and Slough in a 2012 NIAC report that $f_o$=2 as demanded by conservation of magnetic flux. Several MPS studies concluded that $f_o$ is closer to 2. The falloff rate $f_o$ is a critical parameter in the determination of performance.

The RMF-induced rotating disc of electrons has current density (A m^{−2}) $j_\theta(r)$ at distance r from the antenna for $f_o=1$ and for $f_o=2$, which states that flux conservation requires this falloff rate, consistent with a criticism of M2P2 by Cattell as follows:

$j_\theta(r,f_o)=\frac{2 f_o \, B(R_0) \, R_0^{f_o} }{\mu_0 \, r^{f_o+1} } \, \, ,r>R_0$	PM.1

where $B(R_0)$ T is the magnetic field flux density at radius $R_0 \approx R_c$ m near the antenna coils. Note that the current density is highest at $r=R_0$ and falls off at a rate of $f_o+1$. A critical condition for the plasma magnet design provides a lower bound on the RMF frequency $\omega_{RMF}$ rad/s as follows so that electrons in the plasma wind are magnetized and rotate but the ions are not magnetized and do not rotate:

$\omega_{RMF}>\omega_{ci} = \frac {Z \, e \, B(R_0)}{m_i}$	PM.2

where $\omega_{ci}$ is the ion gyrofrequency (s^{−1}) in the RMF near the antenna coils, $Z$ is charge number of the ion, $e$ is the elementary charge, and $m_i$ kg is the (average) mass of the ion(s). Specifying the magnetic field near the coils at radius $R_0$ is critical since this is where the current density is greatest. Choosing a magnetic field at magnetopause yields a lower value of $\omega_{RMF}$ but ions closer to the coils will rotate. Another condition is that $\omega_{RMF}$ be small enough such that collisions are extremely unlikely.

The required power to generate the RMF $P_{RMF}$ is derived by integrating the product of the square of the current density from equation PM.1 and the resistivity of the plasma $\eta_p$ from $R_0$ to $R_{mp}$ with the result as follows:

$P_{RMF}\approx \frac {4 \, \pi \, \eta_p}{\mu_0^2} \, B(R_0)^2 \, R_0 \, \frac{f_o^2}{2f_o-1}$	PM.3

where $\eta_p$ is the Spitzer resistivity (W m) of the plasma of ~1.2×10^{−3} $T_e^{-3/2}$ where $T_e$ is the electron temperature assumed to be 15 eV, the same result for $f_o=1$ and for $f_o=2$.

Starting with the definition of plasma wind force from equation MFM.5, noting that $P_w=F_w u$ rearranging and recognizing that equation PM.3 gives the solution for $B(R_0)$, which can be substituted and then using equation MHD.2 for $B_{mp}$ yields the following expression

$P_w = \frac{C_d}{2\, C_{SO} } \rho \, u^3 \, \pi \, R_0^2 \, \biggl(\frac {P_{RMF} }{u^2\, R_0 \, \rho \, \mu_0} \biggr)^{1/f_o} \biggl(\frac {\mu_0^2}{4 \pi \eta_p} \frac {2f_o-1}{f_o^2} \biggr)^{1/f_o}$	PM.4

which when multiplied by $C_d/2$ with $C_SO=1$ is the same as for $f_o=1$ Note that solution for $P_{RMF}$ and $R_0$ must also satisfy equation MHD.3, to which the comments following regarding a "tremendous leverage of power" do not address.

Note that a number of the examples cited in assume a magnetopause radius $R_{mp}$ that do not meet the MHD applicability test of equation MHD.5. From the definition of power in physics a constant force is power divided by velocity, the force generated by the plasma magnet (PM) sail is as follows from equation PM.4

$F_{PM} = \frac {P_w}{u} = \frac{C_d}{2\, C_{SO} } \rho \, u^2 \, \pi \, R_0^2 \, \biggl(\frac {P_{RMF} }{ u^2 \, R_0 \, \rho \, \mu_0} \biggr)^{1/f_o} \biggl(\frac {\mu_0^2}{4 \pi \eta_p} \frac {2f_o-1}{f_o^2} \biggr)^{1/f_o}$	PM.5

Comparing the above with Equation (MFM.6), note the dependence on plasma mass density $\rho$ is of the same form $\rho ^{1-1/f_o}$. Note from Equation PM.5 that as the falloff rate $f_o$ increases that the force derived from the plasma wind decreases, or to maintain the same force $P_{RMF}$ and/or $R_0$ must increase to maintain the same force $F_{PM}$.

Equation CMC.2 gives the mass for each physical coil of radius $R_c$ m. Since the RMF requires alternating current and semiconductors are not efficient at higher frequencies, aluminum was specified with mass density $\delta_c$ = 2,700 kg/m^{3}. Estimates of the coil mass are optimistic by a factor of $4 \pi$ since only one coil was sized and the coil circumference was specified as $R_c$ instead of $2 \pi R_c$.

The coil resistance is the product of coil material resistivity (Ω m) $\eta_c$ (e.g., ~3×10^{−8} Ωm for aluminum) and the coil length $2 \pi R_c$ divided by the coil wire cross sectional area where $r_c$ is the radius of the coil wire as follows:

$\Omega_c = \frac{\eta_c 2 \pi R_c}{\pi r_c^2} = \frac {2 \eta_c R_c}{r_c^2}$	PM.6

Some additional power must compensate for resistive loss but it is orders of magnitude less than $P_{RMF}$. The peak current carried by a coil is specified by the RMF power and coil resistance from the definition of electrical power in physics as follows:

$I_c = \sqrt{\frac {P_{RMF} }{\Omega_c} }$	PM.7

The current induced in the disc by the RMF $I_{ic}$ is the integral of the current density $j(r,f_o)$ from equation PM.1 on the surface of the disc with inner radius $R_c$ and outer radius $R_{MP}$ with result:

$$I_{ic} = \frac {2 f_o \pi \, B(R_c)}{\mu_0} \begin{cases} R_c \ln(R_{mp}/R_0) &\text{, }f_o{=1} \\ 1-R_c/R_{mp} & \text{, }f_o{=2}\end{cases}$$	PM.8

the same result for $f_o$=1.

Laboratory experiments validated that the RMF creates a magnetospheric bubble, electron temperature near the coils increases indicating presence of the rotating disc of electrons and that thrust was generated. Since the scale of a terrestrial experiment is limited, simulations or a flight trial was recommended. Some of these concepts adapted to an ionospheric plasma environment were carried on in the plasma magnetoshell design.

In 2022 Freeze, Greason and others published a detailed design for a plasma magnet based sail for a spacecraft named Wind Rider that would use solar wind force to accelerate away from near Earth and decelerate against the magnetosphere of Jupiter in a spaceflight trial mission called Jupiter Observing Velocity Experiment (JOVE). This design employed a pair of superconducting coils each with radius $R_c$ of 9 m, an alternating current of $I_c$ of 112 A with $\omega_{RMF}/(2\pi)$ and a falloff rate of $f_o=1$. A transit time to Jupiter of 25 days was reported for a 21 kg spacecraft design launched in a 16 U Cubesat format.

Using $f_o$=1 creates very optimistic performance numbers, but since Slough changed this to $f_o$=2 in 2011 and 2012, the case of $f_o=1$ is not compared in this article. An example for $f_o$=2 using solar wind parameters $\rho$=8×10^{−21} kg/m^{3}, $u$=500 km/s then $r_g$=72 km and $B_{mp}$=4×10^{−8} T with $R_{mp}$=10^{5} m results in $r_g < L$ where MHD applicability occurs. With a coil radius of $R_c$=1,000 m yields $B_0$=4×10^{−4} T from equation MFM.2. The required RMF power from equation PM.3 is 13 kW with a required AC coil current $I_c$=10 A from equation PM.3 resulting in an induced current of $I_{ic}$=2 kA from equation PM.7 . With $C_d$=5 the plasma magnet force from equation PM.3 is 197 N. The magnetic force only for the above parameters is 2.8 N from equation MFM.5 and therefore the plasma magnet thrust gain is 71. The performance comparison section gives and optimistic estimate using constant acceleration for $f_o$=2 results in a transit time of ~100 days.

=== Plasma magnetoshell (PMS) ===
A 2011 paper by Slough and others and a 2012 NIAC report by Kirtley investigated use of the plasma magnet technology with 1/r^{2} magnetic field falloff rate for use in the ionosphere of a planet as a braking mechanism in an approach dubbed Plasma magnetoshell (PMS). The magnetoshell creates drag by ionizing neutral atoms in a planet's ionosphere then magnetically deflecting them. A tether attaching the plasma magnet coils to the spacecraft transfers momentum such that orbital insertion occurs. Analytical models, laboratory demonstrations and mission profiles to Neptune and Mars were described.

In 2017, Kelly described using a single-coil magnet with 1/r^{3} magnetic field falloff rate and more experimental results. In 2019 Kelly and Little published simulation results for magnetoshell performance scaling. A magnet with radius $R_c$=1 m was tethered to a spacecraft with batteries for 1,000 seconds of operation (longer than aerocapture designs). The simulations assumed a magnet mass $M_c$=1,000 kg and total magnetoshell system mass of 1,623 kg, suitable for a Cassini–Huygens or Juno size orbiter. The planet's mass and atmosphere atomic composition and density determine a threshold velocity where magnetoshell operation is feasible. Saturn and Neptune have a hydrogen atmosphere and a threshold velocity of approximately 22 km/s. In a Neptune mission a $\Delta v$=6 km is required for a 5,000 kg spacecraft and must average 50 kN for the maneuver duration. The model overestimates performance for N_{2} (Earth, Titan) and CO_{2} (Venus, Mars) atmospheres since multiple ion species are created and more complex interactions occur. Furthermore, the relatively lower mass of Venus and Mars reduces the threshold velocity below that of feasible magnetoshell operation. The paper states that aerocapture technologies are mature enough for these mission profiles.

In 2021, Kelly and Little published further details for use of drag-modulated plasma aerocapture (DMPA) that when compared to Adaptable Deployable Entry and Placement Technology (ADEPT) for drag-modulated aerocapture (DMA) to Neptune that could deliver 70% higher orbiter mass and experience 30% lower stagnation heating.

=== Beam powered magsail (BPM) ===
A beam-powered of M2P2 variant, MagBeam was proposed in 2011. In this design a magnetic sail is used with beam-powered propulsion, by using a high-power particle accelerator to fire a beam of charged particles at the spacecraft. The magsail would deflect this beam, transferring momentum to the vehicle, that could provide higher acceleration than a solar sail driven by a laser, but a charged particle beam would disperse in a shorter distance than a laser due to the electrostatic repulsion of its component particles. This dispersion problem could potentially be resolved by accelerating a stream of sails which then in turn transfer their momentum to a magsail vehicle, as proposed by Jordin Kare.

== Performance comparison ==
The table below compares performance measures for the magnetic sail designs with the following parameters for the solar wind (sw) at 1 AU: velocity $u_{sw}$= 500 km/s, number density $n_i$= 5×10^{6} m^{−3}, ion mass $m_i$ = 1.67×10^{−27} kg a proton mass, resulting in mass density $\rho_{sw}= m_i n_i$ = 8.4×10^{−21} kg/m^{3}, and coefficient of drag $C_d$=5 where applicable. Equation MHD.2 gives the magnetic field at magnetopause as $B_{mp}$≈ 36 nT, equation MHD.5 gives the ion gyroradius $r_g$≈ 72 km for $C_{Li}$=2. Table entries in boldface are from a cited source as described in the following:

Equation MS.4 determines force for the Magsail (MS) divided by the Freeland correction factor 3.1, equation PM.5 defines the force for the plasma magnet (PM) with the assumed magnetic field falloff rate $f_o$=2. The force for the magnetic sail alone $F_{mag}$ is from equation MFM.5. Thrust gain $G_T$ for the magneto plasma sail (MPS) is the simulation and/or experimentally determined value with force defined equation MPS.2 to account for thrust loss due to operation in a kinematic region. The last column headed MPS+MPD adds a magnetoplasma dynamic thruster (MPD) that has a higher thrust gain as determined by experiment and simulation. Further details are in the section for the specific design. For designs other than MPS and MPS+MPD, the thrust gain $G_T$ is the achieved force from the first row divided by the force of a magnetic sail alone in the second row. The magnetopause distance $R_{mp} \approx L$ and the coil radius $R_c$ are design parameters. Equation MFM.1 with $r=R_{mp}$ defines the magnetic field near the coil(s) as $B_0=B(R_0)=B_{mp}(R_{mp}/R_0)^{1/f_o}$.

The superconducting coil designs used a critical current density $J_c$=2×10^{6} A/m to account for warmer temperatures in the solar system. The plasma magnet uses AC power for the rotating magnetic field, P_{RMF} as specified in Equation PM.3 and cannot use a superconducting coil and assumed an aluminum coil with material density $\delta_c$ = 2,700 kg/m^{3} and coil wire radius $r_c$=5 mm. All other designs assumed a superconducting coil with material density $\delta_c$ =6,500 kg/m^{3}, coil wire radius $r_c$=5 mm, and critical current $\max I_c \approx$1.6 ×10^{6} A, above which the coil becomes a normal conductor. The magnetopause distance $R_{mp} \approx L$ and coil radius $R_c$ for superconducting-coil based designs were adjusted to meet this critical current constraint. The values for the plasma magnet used a value of $R_c$ for $f_o$=2 selected to minimize time to velocity and distance. The MPS values for $R_{mp} \approx L$ and $R_c$ were chosen to match the thrust gain from simulation and scaled experimental results and meet the superconducting-coil critical current constraint.

Equation CMC.2 gives the physical coil mass $M_c(phy)$ assuming a coil wire radius $r_c$=5 mm. Equation PM.7 gives the plasma magnet alternating current $I_c$. Equation MFM.3 gives the direct current $I_c$ with $C_0$=2 for all other designs. The plasma magnet RMF uses the input alternating current $I_c$ (kA) to rotate electrons in captured plasma to create an induced direct current disc carrying $I_{ic}$ kA as defined in equation PM.8.

Superconducting coils do not require continuous power (except possibly for cooling); however, the plasma magnet design does, as specified in equation PM.3. An estimate for the plasma magnet power supply mass assumes ~3 kg/W for nuclear power in space. Other mass was assumed to be 10 tonnes for MS and 1 tonne for PM and MPS. Acceleration $a$ is the thrust force $F$ from the first row divided by the total mass (coil plus other). An optimistic approximation is constant acceleration $a$, for which the time to reach a target velocity V of 10% of the solar wind velocity is $T_V \approx V/a$ and time to cover a specified distance $D$ ≈ 7.8×10^{8} km (approximate distance from Earth to Jupiter) is $T_D \approx \sqrt{ 2D/a}$ . For comparison purposes the time for a Hohmann transfer from Earth orbit to Jupiter orbit is 2.7 years (almost 1,000 days) but that would allow orbital insertion whereas a magnetic sail would do a flyby unless the magnetosphere and gravity of Jupiter could provide deceleration. Another comparison is the New Horizons interplanetary space probe with a 30 kg payload that flew by Jupiter after 405 days on its way to Pluto.

Parameter	Description	Magsail	PM, f_{o}=2	MPS	MPS+MPD	Units
$F$	Thrust force	644	197	700	611	N
$F_{mag}$	Magnetic Force	644	2.8	175	51	N
$f_o$	Falloff rate	**3**	**2**	**2**	**2**	
$G_T$	Thrust gain	1	71	**4**	**12**	
$L, R_{mp}$	Magneto-pause	**520**	100	100	60	km
$R_c$	Coil radius	**100,000**	1,000	6,300	2,900	m
$B(R_c)$	Coil field	2.5×10^{−6}	4×10^{−4}	1.6×10^{−4}	3.5×10^{−4}	T
$I_c$	Coil current	405	0.01	1,593	1,624	kA
$I_{ic}$	Induced current	—	2	—	—	kA
$P_O$	Required power	—	13	—	—	kW
$M_c$	Coil mass	**474**	4	30	14	tonnes
$M_O$	Other mass	10	5.3	1	1	tonnes
$a$	Acceleration	0.0013	0.021	0.023	0.042	m/s^{2}
$T_V$	Time to velocity	435	27	26	14	days
$T_D$	Time to distance	396	99	96	71	days

The best time to velocity $T_V$ and distance $T_D$ performance occurs for the PM and MPS designs due primarily to much reduced coil and other mass. As described in the M2P2 section, several criticisms asserted that the falloff rate $f_o$=1 was questionable and hence it was not included in this table. Simulations and experiments as described in the MPS section showed that $f_o$=2 is valid with injection of plasma to inflate the magnetic field in a manner similar to M2P2. As described in the PM section, plasma is not injected but instead captured to achieve a falloff rate of $f_o$=2, with calculations assuming $f_o$=1 being very optimistic. The classic Magsail (MS) design generates the most thrust force and has considerable mass but still has relatively good time performance. Parameters for the other designs were chosen to yield comparable time performance subject to the constraints previously described. As described above and further detailed in the section for the respective design, this article contains the equations and parameters to compute performance estimates for different parameter choices.

== Criticisms ==
In 1994 Vulpetti published a critical review regarding viability of space propulsion based on solar wind momentum flux. The paper highlighted technology challenges in terms of the magnetic field source, energy required and interaction between the solar wind and the spacecraft's magnetic field, summarizing that these issues were not insurmountable. The major unresolved issue is spacecraft and mission design that account for the potentially highly variable solar wind velocity and plasma density that could complicate maneuvers by a spacecraft employing magnetic sail technology. Some means of modulating thrust is necessary. If the mission objective is to rapidly escape the solar system then the paper states that this is less of an issue.

In 2006, Bolonkin published a paper that questioned the theoretical viability of a Magsail and described common mistakes. Equation (2) states that the magnetic field of electrons rotating in the large coil was greater than and opposed the magnetic field generated by the current in the coil and hence no thrust would result. In 2014 Vulpetti published a rebuttal that summarized plasma properties, in particular the fact that plasma is quasi-neutral and noted in equation (B1) that the Bolonkin paper equation (2) assumed that the plasma had a large net negative electrical charge. The plasma charge varies statistically over short intervals and the maximum value has negligible impact on Magsail performance. Furthermore, he argued that observations by many spacecraft have observed compression of a magnetic field by dynamic (or ram) pressure that did not depend on particle charges.

In 2017, Gros published results that differed from prior magsail work. A major result was the Magsail kinetic model of equation MKM.2 that is a curve fit to numerical analysis of proton trajectories impacted by a large current carrying superconducting coil. The curve fit scaling relation for the effective sail area $A(v)$ was logarithmic cubed with argument $c I / (v I_G)$ with $I$ the loop current, $I_G$ the curve fit parameter, $v$ the ship velocity and $c$ the speed of light. This differed from the power law scaling $A(v) \sim (v/c)^\alpha$ of prior work. The Gros paper could not trace back this difference to underlying physical arguments and noted that the results are inconsistent, stating that the source for these discrepancies was unclear. Appendix B questioned whether a bow shock will form if the initial spacecraft velocity $v_0$ is large, for example for deceleration after interstellar travel, since the predicted effective sail area $A_G(v)$ is small in this case. One difference is that this analysis used the coil radius $R_c$ for computation of the ion gyroradius as compared with prior work use of the magnetopause radius $R_{mp}$

== Fictional uses in popular culture ==
Magnetic sails have become a popular trope in many works of science fiction although the solar sail is more popular:

1. The ancestor of the magsail, the Bussard magnetic scoop, first appeared in science-fiction in Poul Anderson's 1967 short story To Outlive Eternity, which was followed by the novel Tau Zero in 1970.
2. The magsail appears as a crucial plot device in The Children's Hour, a Man-Kzin Wars novel by Jerry Pournelle and S.M. Stirling (1991).
3. It also features prominently in the science-fiction novels of Michael Flynn, particularly in The Wreck of the River of Stars (2003); this book is the tale of the last flight of a magnetic sail ship when fusion rockets based on the Farnsworth-Hirsch Fusor have become the preferred technology.
4. GURPS Spaceships features both solar sails and magnetic sails as possible methods of spacecraft propulsion.

Although not referred to as a "magnetic sail", the concept was used in the novel Encounter with Tiber by Buzz Aldrin and John Barnes as a braking mechanism to decelerate starships from relativistic speed.

== See also ==
- Electric sail – Proposed spacecraft propulsion device
- Electrodynamic tether – Long conducting wires which can act as electrical motors or generators interacts with magnetosphere in similar manner to magsail
- MagBeam (Magnetized beamed plasma propulsion) – a beam-powered variant of mini-magnetospheric plasma propulsion (M2P2).
- Spacecraft propulsion – Method used to accelerate spacecraft – Other methods of spacecraft propulsion used to change the velocity of spacecraft and artificial satellites.
