= Solar power in space =

- Solar panels on spacecraft, covers using solar power on spacecraft
- Space-based solar power, is the concept using spacecraft in space for Earth power.
