= Luna Ring =

Speculative engineering project

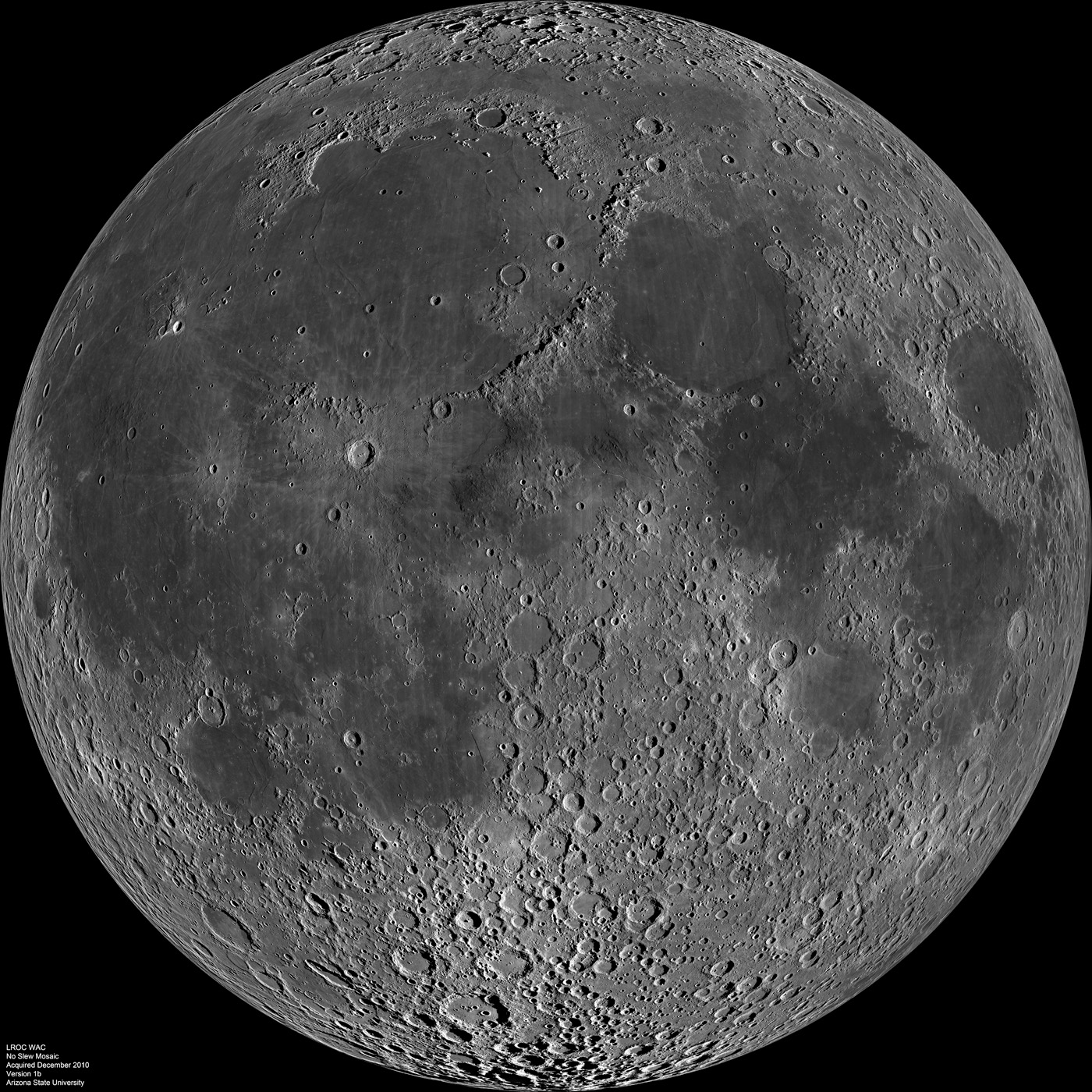
The near side of the moon, from where energy would be beamed to Earth, according to the Luna Ring project.

Luna Ring is a speculative engineering project which consists of a series of solar generators, disposed around the equator of the Moon, that could send the generated electric energy back to the Earth via microwaves from the near side of the Moon. The project was proposed by Japanese construction firm Shimizu Corporation, after the 2011 Tōhoku earthquake and tsunami destroyed the Fukushima Daiichi Nuclear Power Plant, creating public opposition against nuclear electric energy. Until then, Japan had relied heavily on nuclear power.

== Construction ==
The construction of a concrete ring on the Moon's equator to support the solar panels would be performed by robots that would be teleguided from Earth. Then, the solar panels would be placed on the concrete layer, and connected to microwave and laser transmitting stations. The energy sent to Earth that way could be captured by receiving stations all through the day. The fact that the ring would surround the entire moon would mean that at least half of it would always be lit by the sun, resulting in constant electric production.

In 2013, Shimizu Corporation stated that the construction of the Luna Ring could start as early as 2035. However, the practical drawbacks of putting such a technically vast and complex project into place could hamper its construction, even if it could pave the way for simpler projects in clean energy production.

== See also ==
- Space-based solar power
