= Peter Glaser =

Czechoslovak-born American scientist and aerospace engineer (1923-2014)

Peter Edward Glaser
- Born: September 5, 1923; Žatec, Czechoslovakia
- Died: May 29, 2014 (aged 90); Cambridge, Massachusetts, U.S.
- Occupation: Aerospace engineer
- Known for: Patented the concept of solar-power satellite
- Spouse: Eva F. Graf
- Children: 3

Peter Edward Glaser (September 5, 1923 – May 29, 2014) was a Czechoslovak-born American scientist and aerospace engineer. He served as Vice President, Advanced Technology (1985–94), was employed at Arthur D. Little, Inc., Cambridge, MA (1955–94); subsequently he served as a consultant to the company (1994–2005). He was president of Power from Space Consultants (1994–2005). Glaser retired in 2005.

== Professional ==
Glaser's areas of professional activity have included solar and arc imaging furnaces, high temperature research, solar power satellites, solar heating and cooling, photovoltaic conversion, rural electrification systems using renewable resources, lunar surface missions, commercial space power, remote sensing, extra-vehicular activity on the Moon, launch site selection, space station habitation module appliances, advanced space transportation devices, space-based sensor systems to identify carbon dioxide-induced climate changes, space station portable contamination detectors, spacesuit gloves and boot soles, extravehicular dust protection, power relay satellites, and high-altitude long-endurance aircraft using wireless power transmission.

Glaser headed the Design Department of Werner Textile Consultants (1949–53). After his graduate studies Glaser spent his entire full-time professional career with Arthur D. Little, Inc. Glaser's professional papers and some of his personal papers (32 cubic feet in 96 boxes) are on deposit with Massachusetts Institute of Technology Library Archives.

=== Projects ===
He was project manager for the Apollo 11 Lunar Ranging Retroreflector Array installed on the lunar surface of July 20, 1969, and two other arrays installed on subsequent missions — the only science experiments still in operation on the Moon. He was responsible for the Lunar Heat Flow Probes and the Lunar Gravimeter which were operational during the Apollo program, and the Initial Blood Storage Experiment flown on the Space Shuttle Columbia (STS-61-C) in January 1986, to explore gravitational effects on human blood cells. In 1968 he presented the concept for, and in 1973 was granted the US patent on, the Solar Power Satellite to supply power from space for use on the Earth.

=== Memberships, offices, and advisory positions ===
Glaser served as consultant to the National Research Council (1960–62), a member of its board of assessment of the National Institute of Standards and Technology program (1993–96), and panel member (1994–95). He served as an advisor to NASA (1963–67) and as a member of its Advisory Council (1986), the Task Force on Space Goals, and the Lunar Energy Enterprise Case Study task force (1988–89). He served as a member of the Materials Advisory Board of the National Academy of Sciences (1958) of its Study Group on Solar Energy (1971–85). He was a member of the Solar Power Satellite Advisory Panel of the Office of Technology Assessment of the United States Congress (1980–81).

Glaser was a fellow of the American Association for the Advancement of Science and of the American Institute of Aeronautics and Astronautics. He was a member of the American Solar Energy Society and served as its president (1967–72). He was a member of the International Solar Energy Society and served as its President (1968–69). He was a member of the American Astronautical Society and served on the board of directors (1977–84). In 1978 he formed the SUNSAT Energy Council, an NGO associated with the United Nations Economic and Social Council, and served as its president (1978–94) and chairman (1994–2000). He was a member of the International Astronautical Federation and chaired the Space Power Committee (1984–89). Glaser was a member of the National Space Society, serving on the Board of Advisors (1990–94), as director (1994–97), and on the Board of Governors (1997–2005). He was a member of the Management Advisory Board of the Center for Space Power of the Texas A&M University System (1990–94). He was a member of the senior Advisory Board of the Space Studies Institute (1990–2005). He was a member of the United Societies in Space and served as a regent. Glaser was a voting member of the Engineering Council of Columbia University (1984) and an advisor to Space Power Research, Japan (1998–2005). He was a member of the American Society of Mechanical Engineers, of the International Academy of Astronautics, and of the American Society for Macro Engineering. He was a member of the International Institute of Refrigeration (1959–72).

=== Publication activity ===
Glaser has published more than 800 scientific books and papers.

Glaser was Editor-in-Chief of the Journal of Solar Energy (1972–85) and a member of the editorial board (1985–93). He was Associate Editor of Space Power Journal (1980–86). He sat on the editorial boards of Space Policy, Space Power, Journal of Practical Applications in Space, and Solar Energy. He was guest editor of the special issue of Space Policy on "Space Solar Power." He contributed to Standard Handbook of Powerplant Engineering (1998).

Glaser was editor of The Lunar Surface Layer (1964), Thermal Imaging Techniques (1964), Solar Power Satellites — The Emerging Energy Option (1993), Solar Power Satellites — A Space Energy System for Earth, 2nd ed. (1998), and Solar Power Systems in Space.

== Honors ==
Glaser was awarded the Carl F. Kayan Medal in 1974 by Columbia University for contributions to the field of engineering. He received the Farrington Daniels Award from the International Solar Energy Society in 1983. In 1993 the International Astronautical Federation established the Peter Glaser Plenary Lecture to be given at the Annual Congresses. He was inducted into the Space Technology Hall of Fame of the Space Foundation in 1996.

== Personal ==
Peter Glaser was born in Žatec, Czechoslovakia (now in the Czech Republic) to Hugo and Helen (Weiss) Glaser. Peter Edward Glaser was named, in his middle name, after his great-uncle Eduard Glaser, the 19th-century explorer of southern Arabia, including Sheba. Glaser emigrated to the US in 1948; he was naturalized as a US citizen in 1954. He married Eva F. Graf on October 16, 1955. Further family information here.

=== Education ===
Glaser earned a diploma from Leeds College of Technology in 1943, a diploma from Charles University in Prague in 1947, and Master of Science (1951) and of Doctor of Philosophy (1955) degrees from Columbia University.

=== Military service ===
During World War II, Glaser served in the Free Czechoslovak Army. He received a commendation from Czech President Edvard Beneš for personal bravery.

=== Archaeology ===
Glaser's avocation was the archaeology of southern Arabia. He was given ownership of Eduard Glaser's personal collection of Arabian artifacts. However, this collection remained in Czechoslovakia when he immigrated to the US, and as of his death the Czech Republic's government had refused to relinquish it to him. The collection consists of 99 items, including ceremonial daggers, hand-carved water vessels, a stone lantern from the palace of the Queen of Sheba, antique vases, porcelain and ceramic objets d'art, and hand-woven textiles. Glaser testified before the Helsinki Commission about the Czech government's resistance to restoring personal property which that government holds.
