= Shimizu Corporation =

Architectural, civil engineering and general constructing firm in Japan

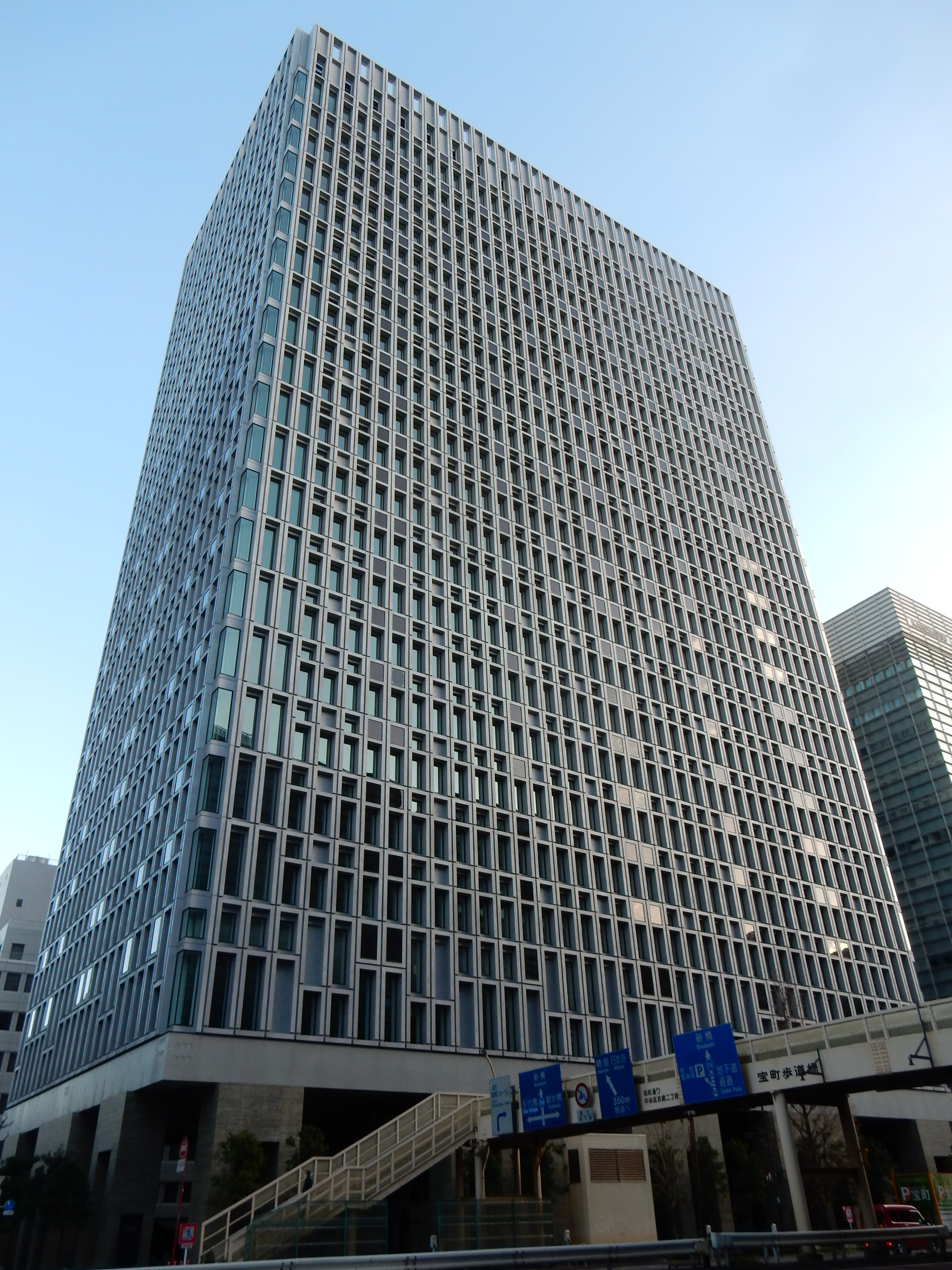
- Headquarters in Tokyo, Japan
- Native name: 清水建設株式会社
- Romanized name: Shimizu Kensetsu kabushiki gaisha
- Type: Public KK
- Traded as: TYO: 1803; NAG: 1803; Nikkei 225 component (TYO)
- ISIN: JP3358800005
- Industry: Heavy construction; Engineering; Project Management
- Founded: 1804; 222 years ago); Edo (present day Tokyo)
- Founder: Shimizu Kisuke I
- Headquarters: 2-16-1 Kyobashi, Chuo-ku, Tokyo 104-8370, Japan
- Area served: Worldwide
- Key people: Kazuyuki Inoue (Representative director and President); Motoaki Shimizu (director, current representative of Shimizu family)
- Products: Civil engineering; Construction; Design; Real estate
- Revenue: ▲$ 15.043 billion USD (FY 2012) (¥ 1,416 billion JPY) (FY 2012)
- Net income: ▲$ 62.69 million USD (FY 2012) (¥ 5.901 billion JPY) (FY 2012)
- Owner: Shimizu family (12.46%); Mitsui Fudosan (1.08%); Nisshin Seifun Group (0.38%); Mitsubishi Estate (0.35%); Asahi Industries (0.01%); Toei Company (0.01%); Tobu Railway (0.01%); ANA Holdings (0.01%)
- Number of employees: 17,229 (As of April 1, 2023)
- Website: shimz.co.jp

Shimizu Corporation (清水建設株式会社, Shimizu Kensetsu kabushiki gaisha) is an architectural, civil engineering and general contracting firm. It has annual sales of approximately US$15 billion and has been widely recognized as one of the top 5 contractors in Japan and among the top 20 in the world.

It is a family business listed in the Tokyo and Osaka stock exchanges and a constituent of the Nikkei 225 index.

== History ==
=== Architectures ===
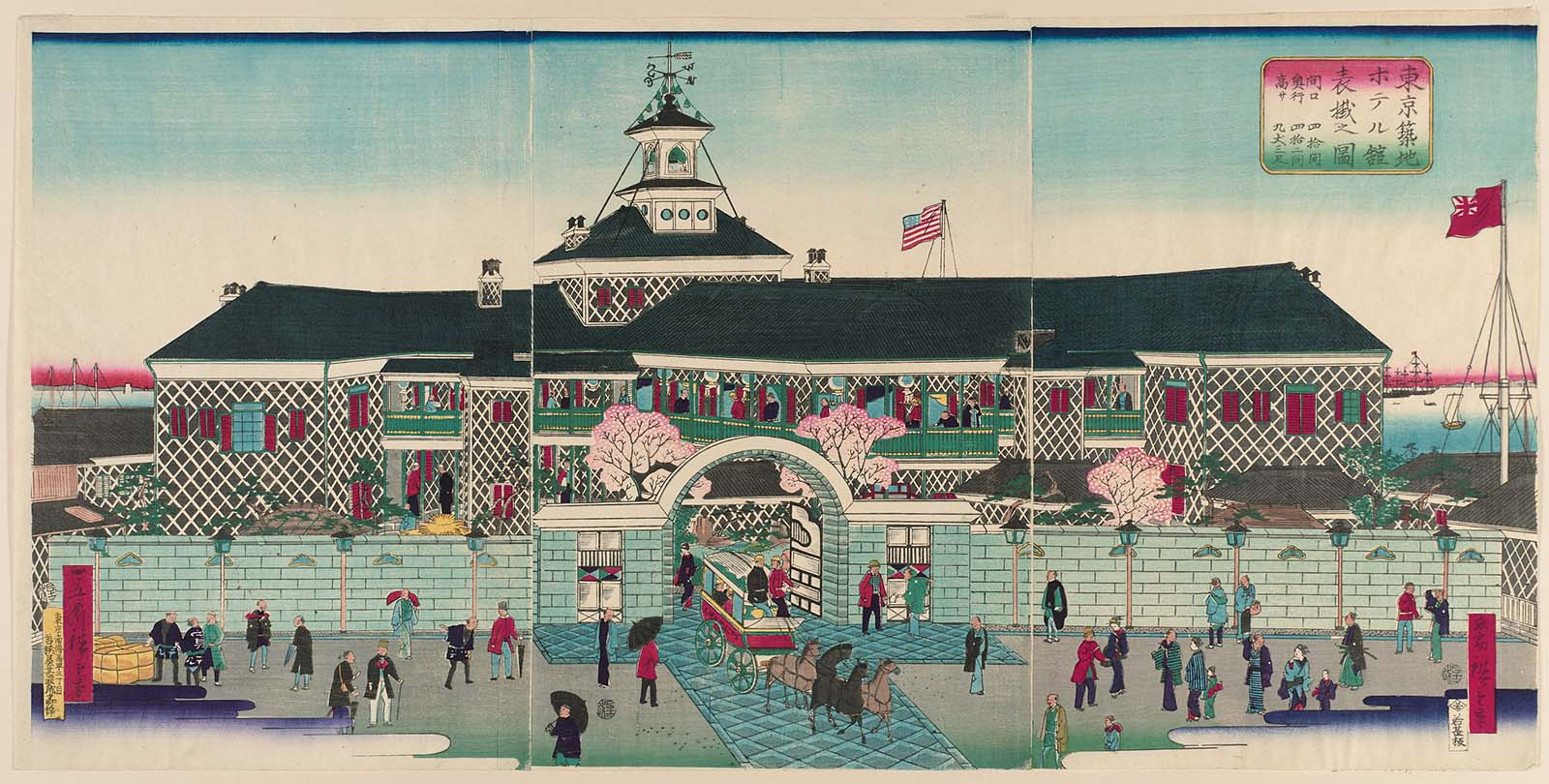
Tskige Hotel was the first hotel for Westerners opened in 1868.

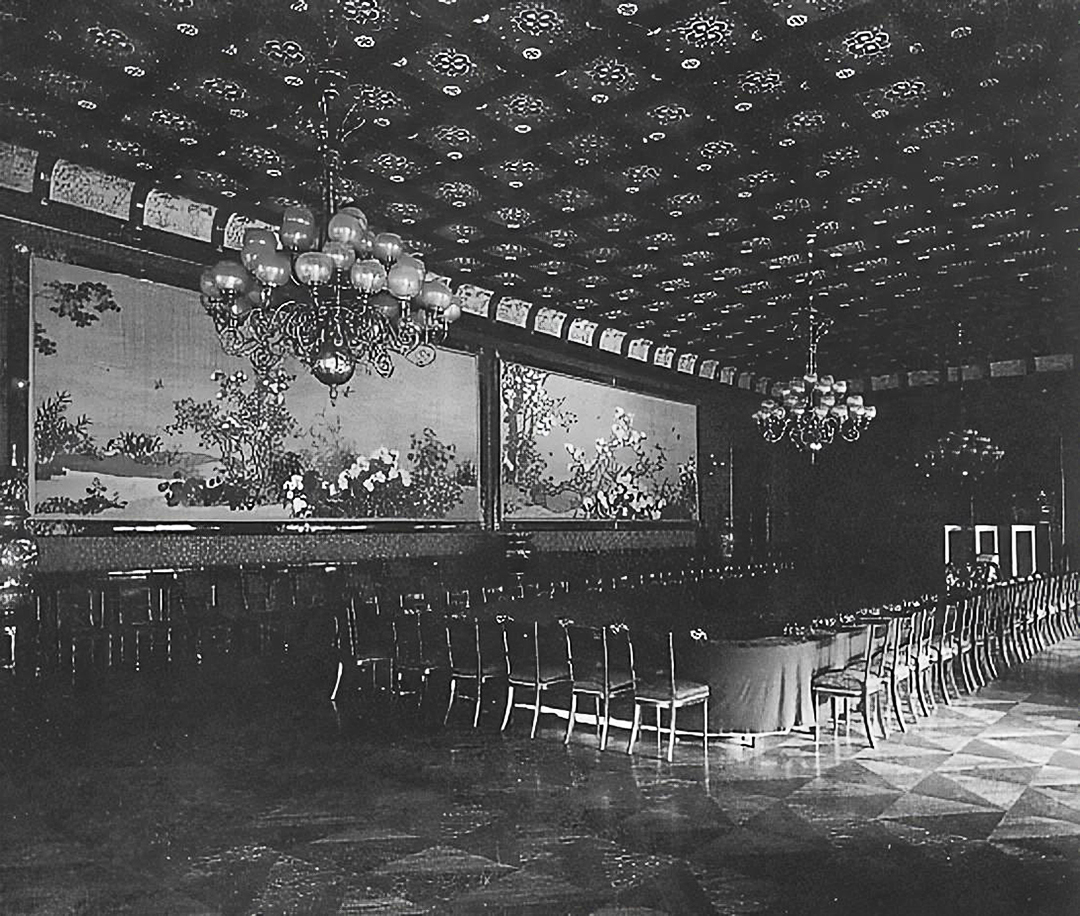
Second Meiji Palace rebuilt in 1888, after having burnt down in 1873

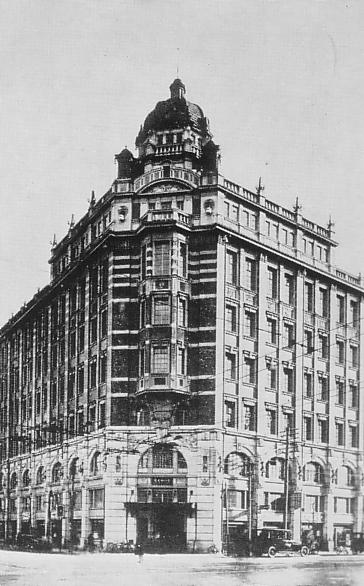
The first Dai-ichi Life building designed by Tatsuno Kingo in 1921

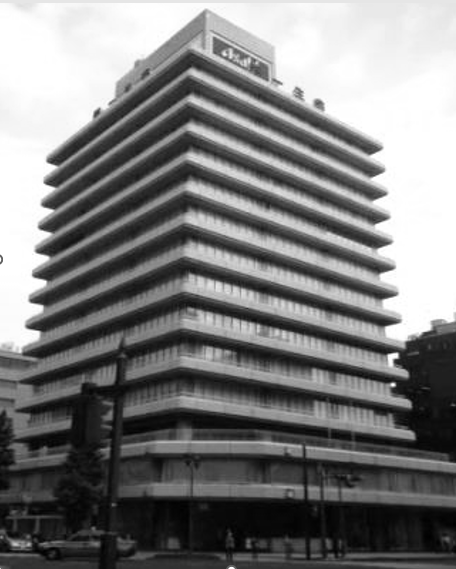
Daiichi-Life building (1971)

=== List of the Presidents ===
1. Shimizu Kisuke (1804 - 1859) - Founder
2. Shimizu Kisuke, Formerly Fujisawa Seishichi (1859 - 1891) - Step son of Kisuke
3. Shimizu Mitsunosuke (1881 - 1887)
4. Shimizu Mitsunosuke, formerly Shimizu Kisaburo (1887 - 1915)
5. Shimizu Teikichi (1915 - 1940) - Step brother of the father Mitsunosuke.
6. Shimizu Yasuo (1940 - 1966) - the son of Teikichi, the heir of Kisaburo
7. Yoshikawa Seiichi (1966 - 1972)
8. Noji Kiichi (1972 - 1981)
9. Yoshino Teruzo (1981年 - 1989)
10. Imamura Harusuke (1990 - 1999)
11. Nomura Tetsuya (1999 - 2007)
12. Miyamoto Yoichi (2007 - 2016)

== About Shimizu ==
The company is named after its founder Kisuke Shimizu, who was born in Koba Village, Etchu (now part of Toyama), and has nothing to do with the former city Shimizu in Shizuoka Prefecture. Kisuke Shimizu formed the company in Edo (now Tokyo) in 1804. The company has been headquartered there ever since.

Shimizu Corporation is an international general contractor, publicly listed on the Tokyo Stock Exchange, the Nagoya Stock Exchange and the Osaka Securities Exchange and is a constituent of the Nikkei 225 stock index. It has a network spanning Asia, Europe, North America, the Middle East and Africa.

== Services offered ==
- Planning & Consulting
- Development & Financing
- Design
- Construction
- Facility Management
- Maintenance
- Renovation
- Engineering & Technology
- Research & Development

== Notable constructions ==
Japan

- Yoyogi National Gymnasium
- Tokyo Bay Aqua-Line - Aqua-Line tunnel and Umihotaru (an artificial island used as a rest station on the Aqua-Line)
- JR Hakata City
- Haneda Airport runway D
- Fukuoka Airport Cargo Terminal
- Mode Gakuen Cocoon Tower
- Tokyu Kabukicho Tower

Asia

- Bãi Cháy Bridge
- Singapore MRT
- Singapore Changi Airport Terminal 3
- Malaysia–Singapore Second Link
- Bính Bridge
- Line 1 (Ho Chi Minh City Metro)
- Jakarta MRT North–South Line
- Trinity Tower
- Metro Manila Subway
- Plaridel Bypass Road
- Davao City Bypass Construction Project
- Luzhou Line (Taipei Metro)
- THSR Tainan Station

== Dream Megaproject Concepts ==
- Lunar Solar Power Generation - Luna Ring (generation of electricity using a belt of solar cells around the lunar equator)
- TRY2025 The Environmental Island - Green Float (botanical city concept)
- Shimizu Mega-City Pyramid (a massive pyramid over Tokyo Bay)
- Inter Cell City (a sustainable, environmentally conscious city)
- Space Hotel (space tourism)
- Lunar Bases
- Urban Geo-Grid Plan (coordination of facilities above ground and underground for increased efficiency)
- Desert Aqua-Net Plan (desert canals)
- Ocean Spiral (underwater city)

== See also ==
- Space-based solar power
- Desert greening
- Seasteading
