= David Criswell =

American astronomer (1941–2019)

David R. Criswell (July 17, 1941 – September 10, 2019) was the Director of the Institute for Space Systems Operations (ISSO) at the University of Houston. ISSO is the operational agent for the Houston Partnership for Space Exploration.

Criswell received a Bachelor of Science degree in 1963 (graduating cum laude) and a Master of Science degree in Physics in 1964 from the University of North Texas, in Denton, Texas. In 1968, he received a Doctorate degree in space physics and Astronomy from Rice University in Houston, Texas.

He was an active member of the Power from Space Committee of the International Astronautical Federation and participated in IAF and United Nations Summits dealing with supplying energy to Earth. He also served on the Board of Governors of the National Space Society, a non-profit space advocacy organization in Washington, D.C.

== Views on exploiting lunar resources ==
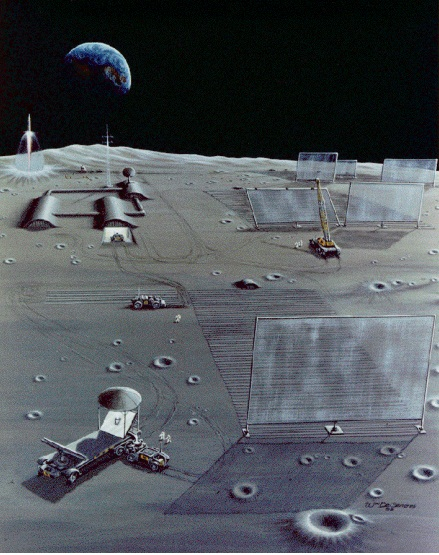
Solar power plant on the moon with microwave phased arrays

For over thirty years, Criswell was an advocate for obtaining solar power from the Moon. He proposed the large-scale construction of solar collectors on the lunar surface, using local lunar materials. The solar energy would be converted to microwave energy and transmitted to Earth.

Criswell envisioned that this energy source would spur an unprecedented amount of global economic growth (Gross World Product increasing by a factor of 10), while having a positive environmental impact (fossil fuel-burning power plants would be decommissioned). He pointed out that lunar-solar energy would not generate nuclear waste, and is not a finite resource (in the sense that fossil fuels are a finite resource).

He estimated that a 1 GigaWatt demo of the lunar-solar power generation system could be built over a 10-year period for approximately $60 billion in 1990 dollars. (For comparison, the 1.65 GW Benban Solar Park in Egypt cost $4 billion in 2019; however, Benban's delivered power is 430 MW compared to the 1 GW demo which would deliver a full 1 GW.)

In short, Criswell believed that lunar-solar energy is the only viable option for generating the massive amounts of electrical power that would be needed to raise the standard of living in third-world nations to that of first-world nations.

He once said, from the University of Houston, that "We are already well beyond what the biosphere can provide. We have to go outside to get something else."

== See also ==
- Future energy development
- Solar power satellite
- In-Situ Resource Utilization
