= Space-based solar power =

Concept of collecting solar power in outer space and distributing it to Earth

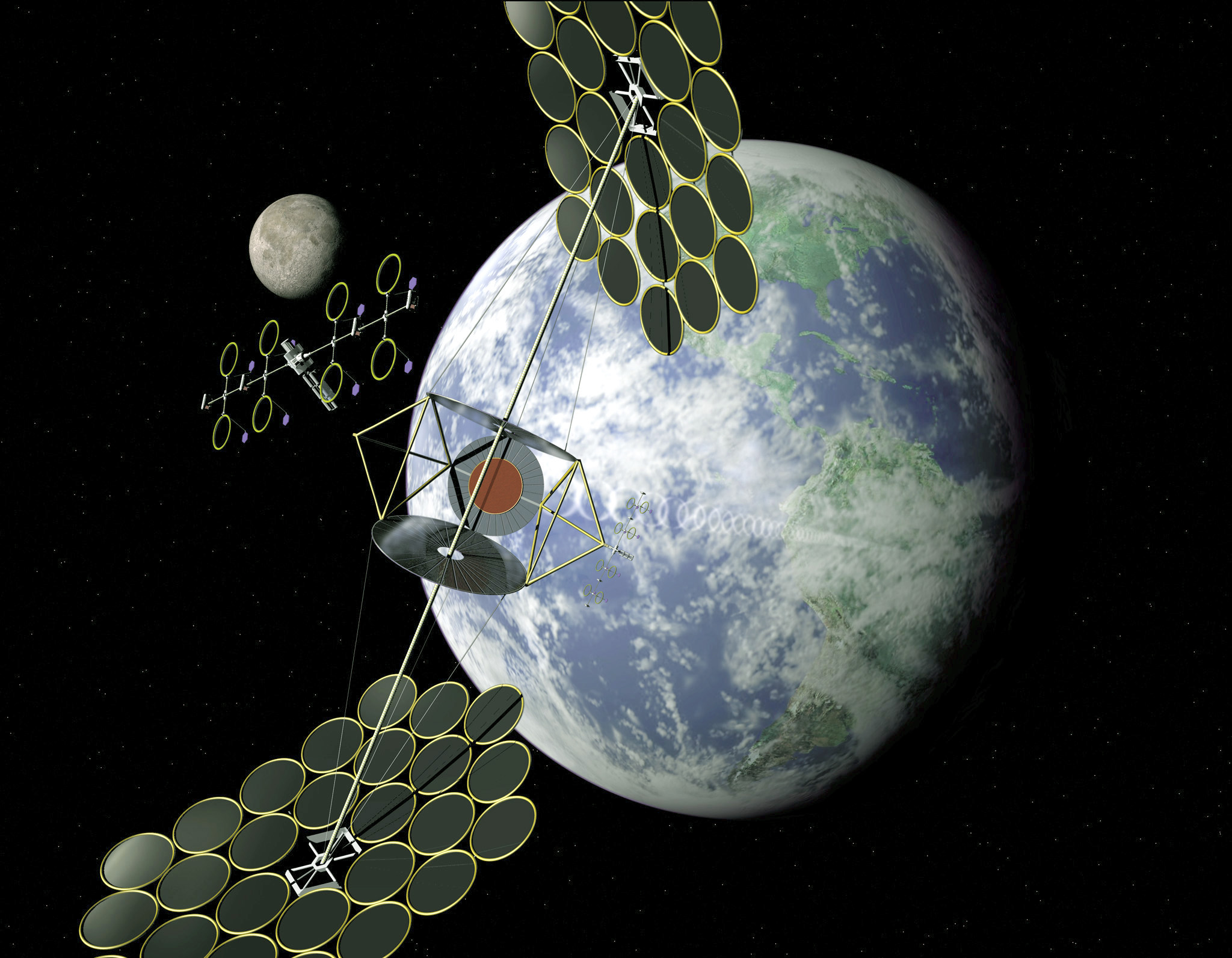
NASA Integrated Symmetrical Concentrator SPS concept

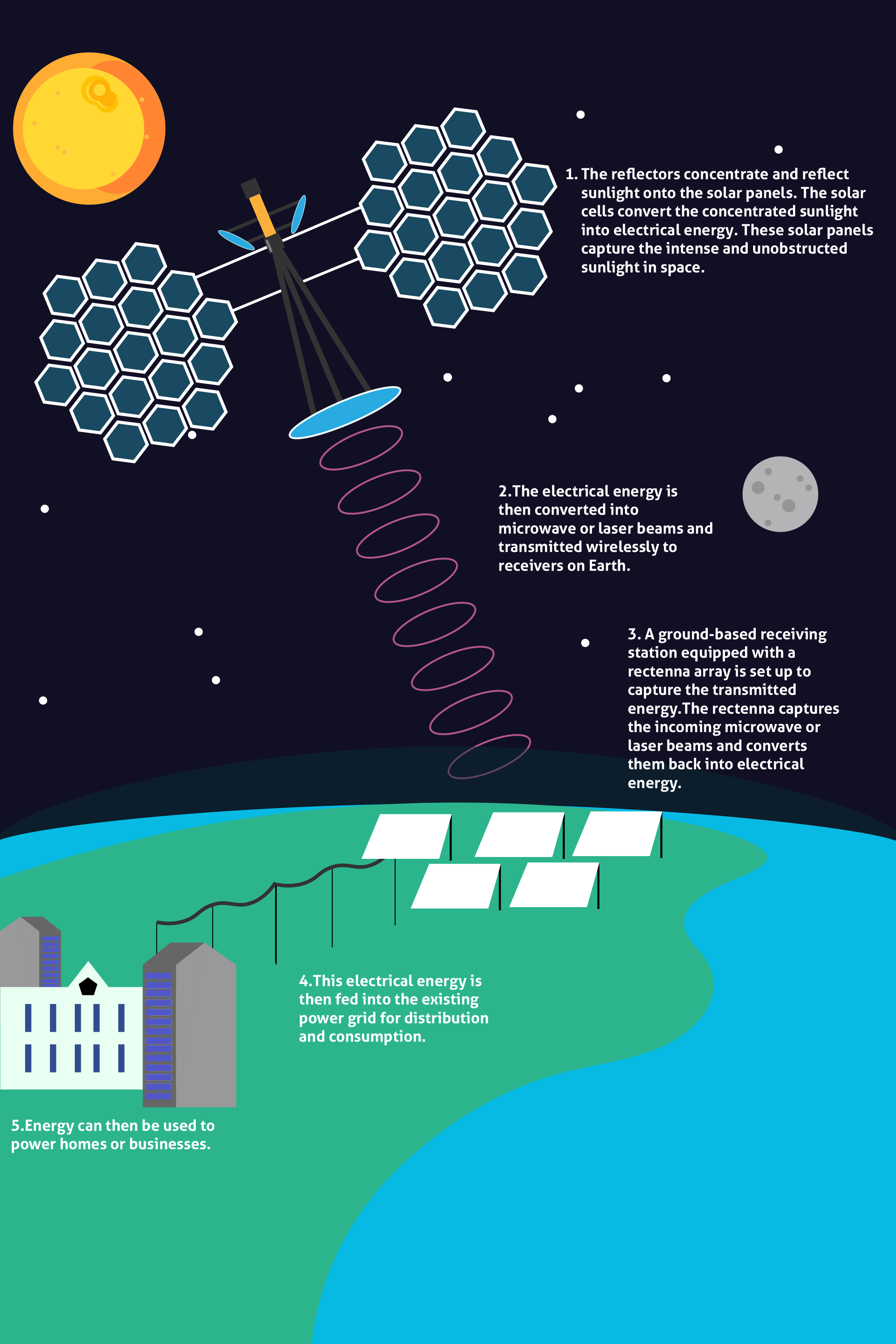
A step by step diagram on space based solar power.

Space-based solar power (SBSP or SSP) is the concept of collecting solar power in outer space with solar power satellites (SPS) and distributing it to Earth. Its advantages include a higher collection of energy due to the lack of reflection and absorption by the atmosphere, the possibility of very little night, and a better ability to orient to face the Sun. Space-based solar power systems convert sunlight to some other form of energy (such as microwaves) which can be transmitted through the atmosphere to receivers on the Earth's surface.

In the 1970s, groups like the L5 Society promoted space-based solar power for civilian energy. They soon recognized the technology potential as a directed energy weapon for ballistic missile defense. This dual-use shaped the 1980s Strategic Defense Initiative (SDI)—whose prominent architects, including physicist Lowell Wood, were early L5 members. Orbital power generation and directed-energy transmission continue to receive funding for modern missile defense such as for the 2025 Golden Dome program.

In May 2020, the US Naval Research Laboratory conducted its first test of solar power generation in a satellite. In August 2021, the California Institute of Technology (Caltech) announced that it planned to launch a SBSP test array by 2023, and at the same time revealed that Donald Bren and his wife Brigitte, both Caltech trustees, had been since 2013 funding the institute's Space-based Solar Power Project, donating over $100 million. Caltech's MAPLE project successfully demonstrated beaming power to earth in 2023. MAPLE transmitted an effective isotropic radiated power (EIRP) of 3.2 watts (+35 dBm), far below the kilowatts typical of commercial communications satellites. The amount of power detected on the ground was about -45 dBm, or less than a tenth of a microwatt.

== History ==
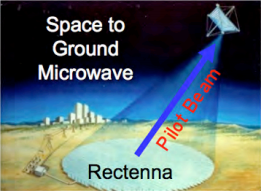
A laser pilot beam guides the microwave power transmission to a rectenna

In 1941, science fiction writer Isaac Asimov published the science fiction short story "Reason", in which a space station transmits energy collected from the Sun to various planets. Solar panels on spacecraft have been in use since 1958, when Vanguard I used them to power one of its radio transmitters; however, the term (and acronyms) above are generally used in the context of large-scale transmission of energy for use on Earth. The SBSP concept, originally known as satellite solar-power system (SSPS), was first described in November 1968. In 1973 Peter Glaser was granted U.S. patent number 3,781,647 for his method of transmitting power over long distances (e.g. from an SPS to Earth's surface) using microwaves from a large antenna (up to one square kilometer) on the satellite to a much larger one, now known as a rectenna, on the ground.

Glaser then was a vice president at Arthur D. Little, Inc. NASA signed a contract with ADL to lead four other companies in a broader study in 1974. They found that, while the concept had several major problems – chiefly the expense of putting the required materials in orbit and the lack of experience on projects of this scale in space – it showed enough promise to merit further investigation and research.

=== Concept development and evaluation ===
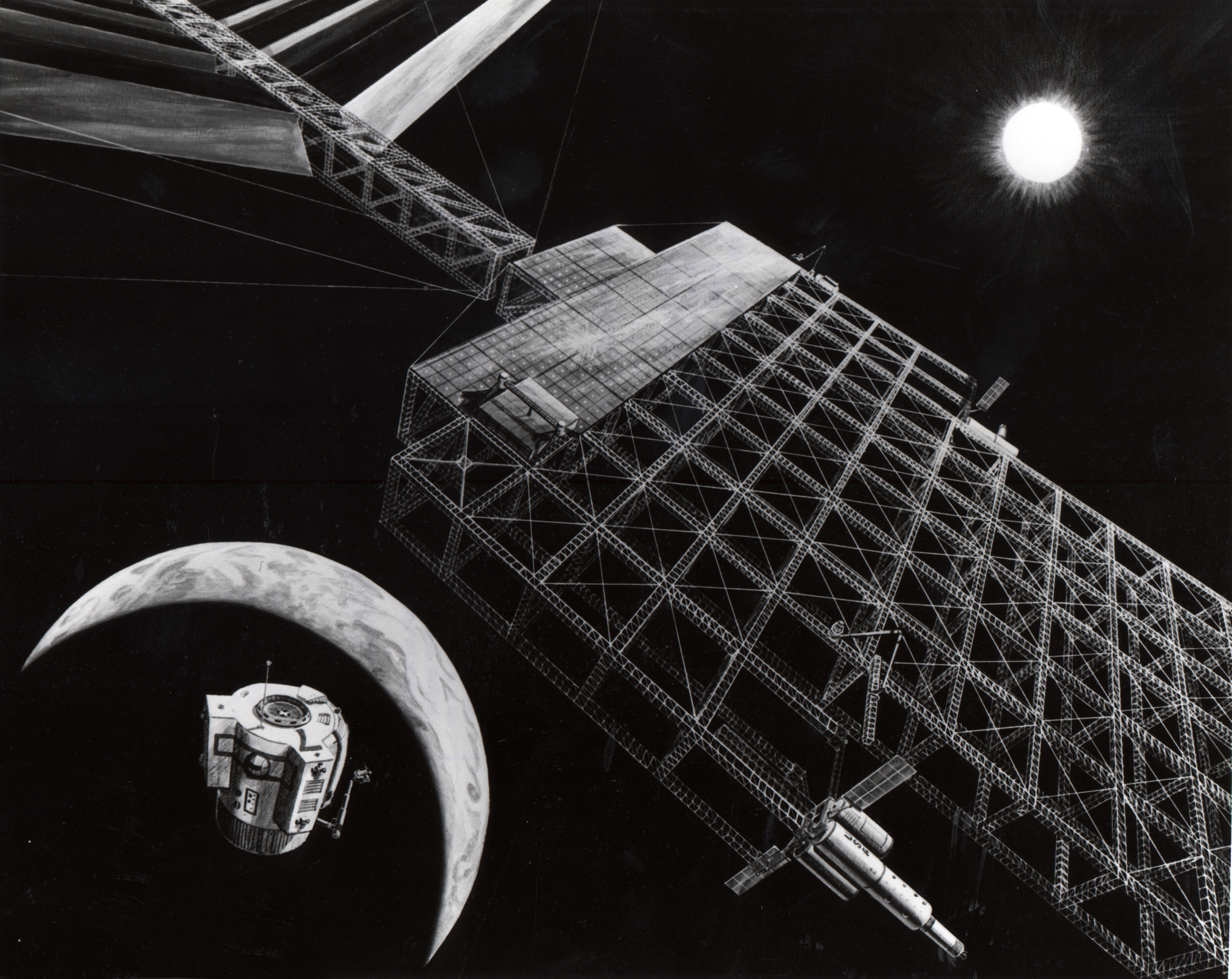
Artist's concept of a solar power satellite in place. Shown is the assembly of a microwave transmission antenna. The solar power satellite was to be located in a geosynchronous orbit, 35,786 kilometres (22,236 mi) above the Earth's surface. NASA 1976

Between 1978 and 1986, the Congress authorized the Department of Energy (DoE) and NASA to jointly investigate the concept. They organized the Satellite Power System Concept Development and Evaluation Program. The study remains the most extensive performed to date (budget $50 million). Several reports were published investigating the engineering feasibility of such a project. They include:

- Resource Requirements (Critical Materials, Energy, and Land)
- Financial/Management Scenarios
- Public Acceptance
- State and Local Regulations as Applied to Satellite Power System Microwave Receiving Antenna Facilities
- Student Participation
- Potential of Laser for SBSP Power Transmission
- International Agreements
- Centralization/Decentralization
- Mapping of Exclusion Areas For Rectenna Sites
- Economic and Demographic Issues Related to Deployment
- Some Questions and Answers
- Meteorological Effects on Laser Beam Propagation and Direct Solar Pumped Lasers
- Public Outreach Experiment
- Power Transmission and Reception Technical Summary and Assessment
- Space Transportation

==== Discontinuation ====
The project was not continued with the change in administrations after the 1980 United States elections. The Office of Technology Assessment concluded that "Too little is currently known about the technical, economic, and environmental aspects of SPS to make a sound decision whether to proceed with its development and deployment. In addition, without further research an SPS demonstration or systems-engineering verification program would be a high-risk venture."

Besides cost, SBSP also introduces several technological hurdles, including the problem of transmitting energy from orbit. Since wires extending from Earth's surface to an orbiting satellite are not feasible with current technology, SBSP designs generally include the wireless power transmission with its associated conversion inefficiencies, as well as land use concerns for antenna stations to receive the energy at Earth's surface. The collecting satellite would convert solar energy into electrical energy, power a microwave transmitter or laser emitter, and transmit this energy to a collector (or microwave rectenna) on Earth's surface. Contrary to appearances in fiction, most designs propose beam energy densities that are not harmful if human beings were to be inadvertently exposed, such as if a transmitting satellite's beam were to wander off-course. But the necessarily vast size of the receiving antennas would still require large blocks of land near the end users. The service life of space-based collectors in the face of long-term exposure to the space environment, including degradation from radiation and micrometeoroid damage, could also become a concern for SBSP.

As of 2020, SBSP is being actively pursued by Japan, China, Russia, India, the United Kingdom, the US, and the European Space Agency.

In 2008, Japan passed its Basic Space Law which established space solar power as a national goal. JAXA has a roadmap to commercial SBSP.

In 2015, the China Academy for Space Technology (CAST) showcased its roadmap at the International Space Development Conference. In February 2019, Science and Technology Daily (科技日报, Keji Ribao), the official newspaper of the Ministry of Science and Technology of the People's Republic of China, reported that construction of a testing base had started in Chongqing's Bishan District. CAST vice-president Li Ming was quoted as saying China expects to be the first nation to build a working space solar power station with practical value. Chinese scientists were reported as planning to launch several small- and medium-sized space power stations between 2021 and 2025. In December 2019, Xinhua News Agency reported that China plans to launch a 200-tonne SBSP station capable of generating megawatts (MW) of electricity to Earth by 2035.

In 1997, NASA conducted its "Fresh Look" study to examine the modern state of SBSP feasibility. In assessing "What has changed" since the DOE study, NASA asserted that the "US National Space Policy now calls for NASA to make significant investments in technology (not a particular vehicle) to drive the costs of ETO [Earth to Orbit] transportation down dramatically. This is, of course, an absolute requirement of space solar power."

Conversely, Pete Worden of NASA claimed that space-based solar is about five orders of magnitude more expensive than solar power from the Arizona desert, with a major cost being the transportation of materials to orbit. Worden referred to possible solutions as speculative and not available for decades at the earliest.

On November 2, 2012, China proposed a space collaboration with India that mentioned SBSP, "may be Space-based Solar Power initiative so that both India and China can work for long term association with proper funding along with other willing space faring nations to bring space solar power to earth."

=== Exploratory Research and Technology program ===
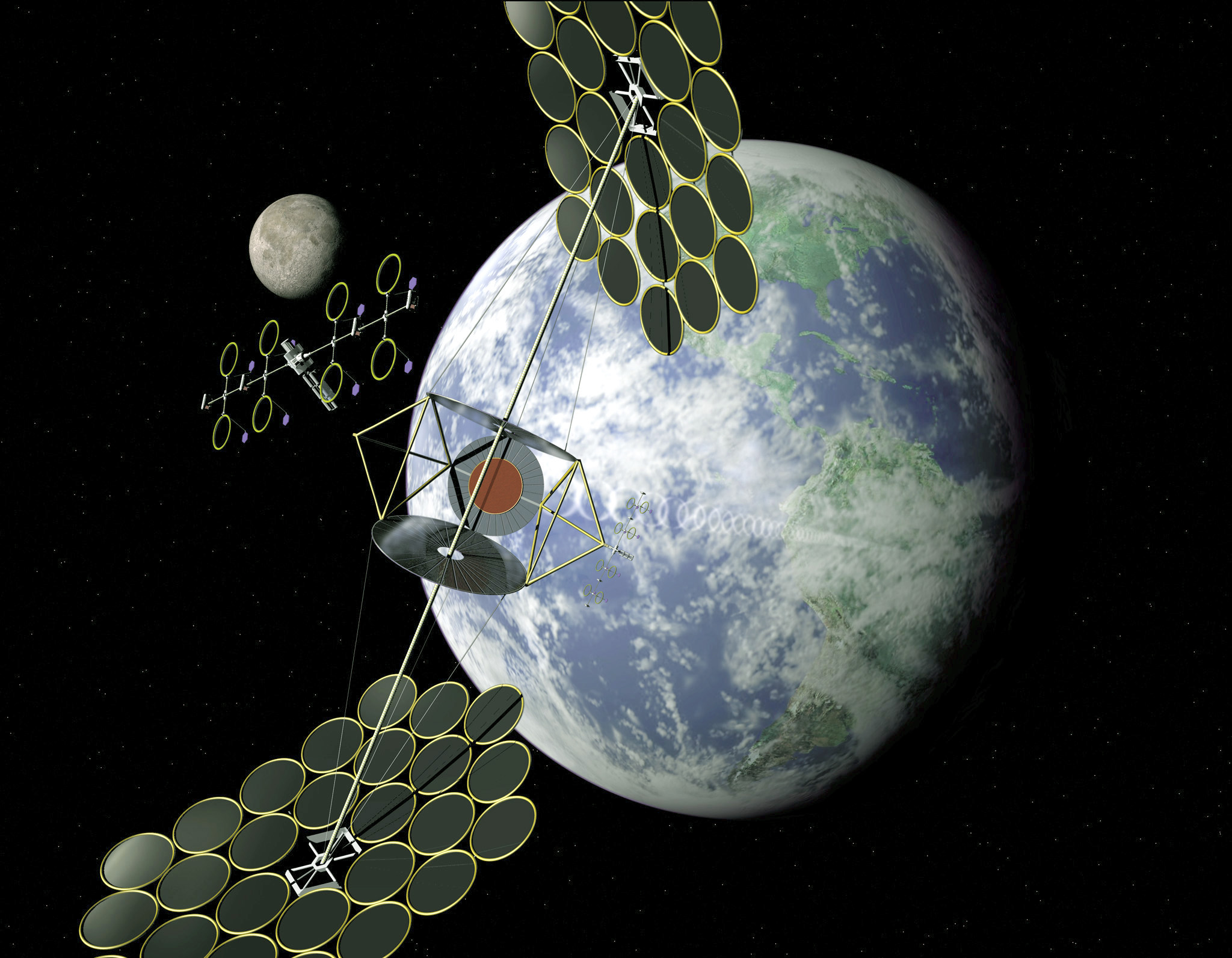
SERT Integrated Symmetrical Concentrator SPS concept.NASA

In 1999, NASA initiated its Space Solar Power Exploratory Research and Technology program (SERT) for the following purposes:

- Perform design studies of selected flight demonstration concepts.
- Evaluate studies of the general feasibility, design, and requirements.
- Create conceptual designs of subsystems that make use of advanced SSP technologies to benefit future space or terrestrial applications.
- Formulate a preliminary plan of action for the U.S. (working with international partners) to undertake an aggressive technology initiative.
- Construct technology development and demonstration roadmaps for critical space solar power (SSP) elements.

SERT went about developing a solar power satellite (SPS) concept for a future gigawatt space power system, to provide electrical power by converting the Sun's energy and beaming it to Earth's surface, and provided a conceptual development path that would utilize current technologies. SERT proposed an inflatable photovoltaic gossamer structure with concentrator lenses or solar heat engines to convert sunlight into electricity. The program looked both at systems in Sun-synchronous orbit and geosynchronous orbit. Some of SERT's conclusions:

- The increasing global energy demand is likely to continue for multiple decades resulting in new power plants of all sizes being built.
- The environmental impact of those plants and their impact on world energy supplies and geopolitical relationships can be problematic.
- Renewable energy is a compelling approach, both philosophically and in engineering terms.
- Many renewable energy sources are limited in their ability to affordably provide the base load power required for global industrial development and prosperity, because of inherent land and water requirements.
- Based on their Concept Definition Study, space solar power concepts may be ready to reenter the discussion.
- Solar power satellites should no longer be envisioned as requiring unimaginably large initial investments in fixed infrastructure before the emplacement of productive power plants can begin.
- Space solar power systems appear to possess a number of significant environmental advantages when compared to alternative approaches.
- The economic viability of space solar power systems depends on multiple factors and the successful development of various new technologies (not least of which is the availability of much lower cost access to space than has been available); however, the same can be said of other advanced power technologies options.
- Space solar power may well emerge as a serious candidate among the options for meeting the energy demands of the 21st century.
- Launch costs in the range of $100–$200 per kilogram of payload from low Earth orbit to Geosynchronous orbit are needed if SPS is to be economically viable.

=== Japan Aerospace Exploration Agency ===
The May 2014 IEEE Spectrum magazine carried a lengthy article "It's Always Sunny in Space" by Susumu Sasaki. The article stated, "It's been the subject of many previous studies and the stuff of sci-fi for decades, but space-based solar power could at last become a reality—and within 25 years, according to a proposal from researchers at the Tokyo-based Japan Aerospace Exploration Agency (JAXA)."

JAXA announced on 12 March 2015 that they wirelessly beamed 1.8 kilowatts 50 meters to a small receiver by converting electricity to microwaves and then back to electricity. This is the standard plan for this type of power. On 12 March 2015 Mitsubishi Heavy Industries demonstrated transmission of 10 kilowatts (kW) of power to a receiver unit located at a distance of 500 meters (m) away.

=== Aetherflux ===
Aetherflux is a venture-funded company focused on beaming solar power, funded with US$50 million. It plans a constellation of small Low Earth Orbit satellites, using infrared lasers. Ground stations are about 5–10 m (16–33 ft) in diameter. It is partially supported this financial year by the US Department of Defense's Operational Energy Capability Improvement Fund (OECIF). Aetherflux pivoted to space-based data centers in December 2025.

== Advantages and disadvantages ==
=== Advantages ===
The SBSP concept is attractive because space has several major advantages over the Earth's surface for the collection of solar power:

- It is always solar noon in space and full sun.
- Collecting surfaces could receive much more intense sunlight, owing to the lack of obstructions such as atmospheric gasses, clouds, dust and other weather events. Consequently, the intensity in orbit is approximately 144% of the maximum attainable intensity on Earth's surface.
- A satellite could be illuminated over 99% of the time and be in Earth's shadow a maximum of only 72 minutes per night at the spring and fall equinoxes at local midnight. Orbiting satellites can be exposed to a consistently high degree of solar radiation, generally for 24 hours per day, whereas earth surface solar panels currently collect power for an average of 29% of the day.
- Power could be relatively quickly redirected directly to areas that need it most. A collecting satellite could possibly direct power on demand to different surface locations based on geographical baseload or peak load power needs.
- Reduced plant and wildlife interference.
- SBSP does not emit greenhouse gases unlike oil, gas, ethanol, and coal plants. Space based solar power also does not depend on or compete with scarce fresh water resources, unlike coal and nuclear plants.
- SBSP generates forty times more than solar panels, and bring almost zero percent of hazardous waste to our environment. It also allows for electricity to be generated continuously, twenty four hours a day, ninety nine percent of the year.
- If the clean energy that is provided from space-based solar power account for just five percent of our national energy consumption, our carbon footprint would be significantly reduced.

=== Disadvantages ===
The SBSP concept also has a number of problems:

- The large cost of launching a satellite into space.
- Microwave optic requires gigawatt scale to compensate for Airy disk beam spreading. Typically a 1 km disk in geosynchronous orbit transmitting at 2.45 GHz spreads out to 10 km at Earth distance.
- Inability to constrain power transmission inside tiny beam angles. For example, a beam of 0.002 degrees (7.2 arc seconds) is required to stay within a one kilometer receiving antenna target from geostationary altitude. The most advanced directional wireless power transfer systems as of 2019 spread their half power beam width across at least 0.9 arc degrees.
- Inaccessibility: Maintenance of an earth-based solar panel is relatively simple, but construction and maintenance on a solar panel in space would typically be done telerobotically. In addition to cost, astronauts working in GEO are exposed to unacceptably high radiation dangers and other risks, and cost about one thousand times more than the same task done telerobotically.
- The space environment is hostile; PV panels (if used) suffer about eight times the degradation they would on Earth (except at orbits that are protected by the magnetosphere).
- Space debris is a major hazard to large objects in space, particularly for large structures such as SBSP systems in transit through the debris below 2000 km. Already in 1978, astrophysicist Donald J. Kessler warned against a self-propagating collision cascade during the assembly of the SPS modules in LEO, which is now known as Kessler syndrome. Collision risk is much reduced in GEO since all the satellites are moving in the same direction at close to the same speed.
- The broadcast frequency of the microwave downlink (if used) would require isolating the SBSP systems away from other satellites. GEO space is already well used and would require coordinating with the ITU-R.
- The large size and corresponding cost of the receiving station on the ground. The cost has been estimated at a billion dollars for 5 GW by SBSP researcher Keith Henson.
- Energy losses during several phases of conversion from photons to electrons to photons back to electrons.
- Waste heat disposal in space power systems is difficult to begin with, but becomes intractable when the entire spacecraft is designed to absorb as much solar radiation as possible. Traditional spacecraft thermal control systems such as radiative vanes may interfere with solar panel occlusion or power transmitters.
- Decommissioning costs: The cost of deorbiting the satellites at the end of their service life to prevent them from exacerbating the orbital space debris problem due to impacts with asteroidal, cometary, and planetary debris is likely to be significant. While the future cost of imparting Delta-V is difficult to estimate, the amount of Delta-V that must be imparted to transfer a satellite from GEO to GTO is 1472 m/s^{2}. If, upon reentry, the disintegrating satellite would release hazardous chemicals into the Earth's atmosphere, then the additional expenses of disassembling the satellite and deorbiting the environmentally hazardous components within a space vehicle with downmass capabilities must be factored into the decommissioning costs.
- Since these systems would be in space, they obviously would not be able to be controlled hands-on. Researchers, will need to create a way to maintain these systems autonomously, which could create some technical issues.
- Research has also shown that an increase in population can increase congestion and ultimately could cause pieces of orbital debris, which was concluded from a test China had done with their satellite.

== Design ==
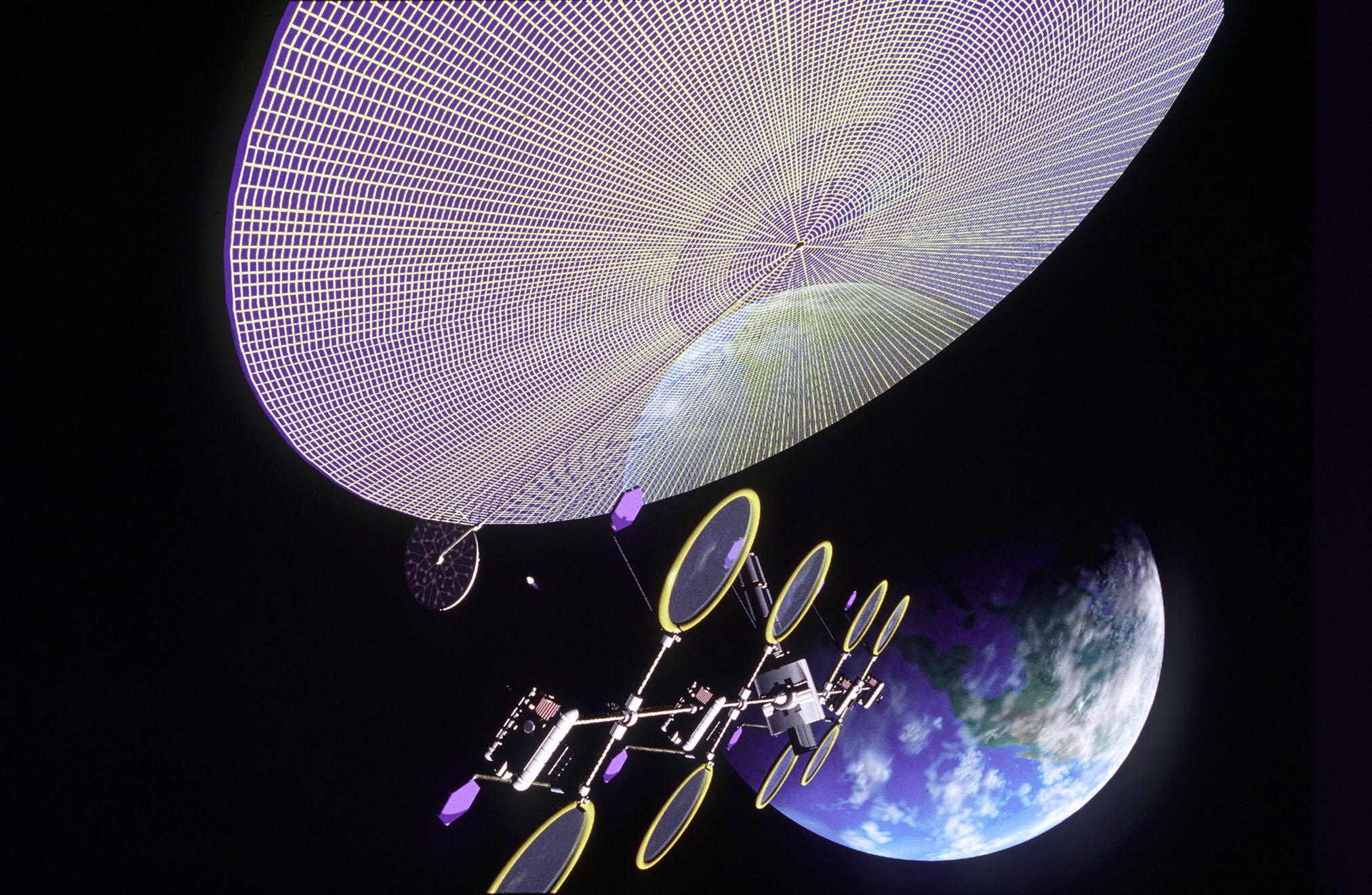
Artist's concept of a solar disk on top of a LEO to GEO electrically powered space tug.

Space-based solar power essentially consists of three elements:

1. collecting solar energy in space with reflectors or inflatable mirrors onto solar cells or heaters for thermal systems
2. wireless power transmission to Earth via microwave or laser
3. receiving power on Earth via a rectenna, a microwave antenna

The space-based portion will not need to support itself against gravity (other than relatively weak tidal stresses). It needs no protection from terrestrial wind or weather, but will have to cope with space hazards such as micrometeors and solar flares. Two basic methods of conversion have been studied: photovoltaic (PV) and solar dynamic (SD). Most analyses of SBSP have focused on photovoltaic conversion using solar cells that directly convert sunlight into electricity. Solar dynamic uses mirrors to concentrate light on a boiler. The use of solar dynamic could reduce mass per watt. Wireless power transmission was proposed early on as a means to transfer energy from collection to the Earth's surface, using either microwave or laser radiation at a variety of frequencies.

=== Microwave power transmission ===
William C. Brown demonstrated in 1964, during Walter Cronkite's CBS News program, a microwave-powered model helicopter that received all the power it needed for flight from a microwave beam. Between 1969 and 1975, Bill Brown was technical director of a JPL Raytheon program that beamed 30 kW of power over a distance of 1 mile (1.6 km) at 9.6% efficiency.

The beam does spread out due to diffraction. At 2.45 GHz, a one km phased array transmitting antenna at GEO spreads to about 10 km diameter to the first zero ring. The overall transmission efficiency is close to 50% depending on a number of factors.

Microwave power transmission of tens of kilowatts has been well proven by existing tests at Goldstone in California (1975) and Grand Bassin on Reunion Island (1997).

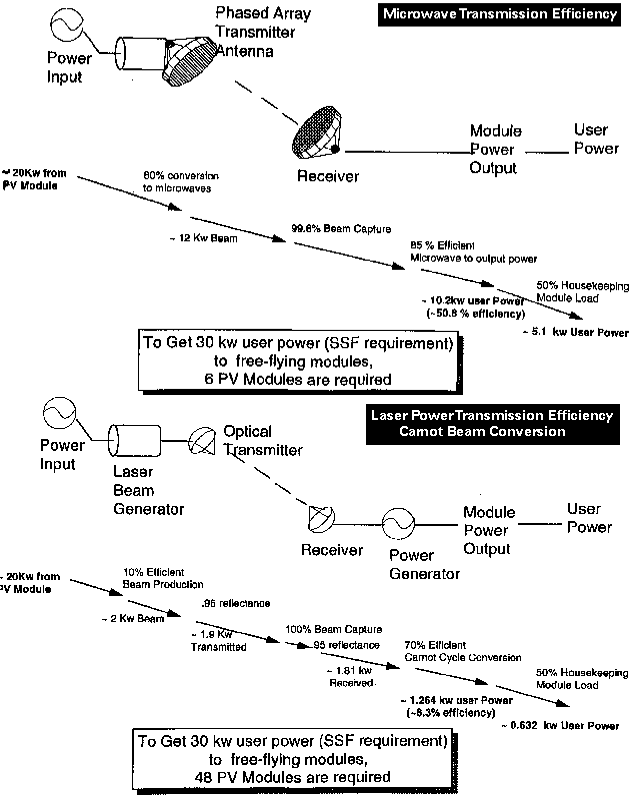
Comparison of laser and microwave power transmission. NASA diagram

More recently, microwave power transmission has been demonstrated, in conjunction with solar energy capture, between a mountaintop in Maui and the island of Hawaii (92 miles away), by a team under John C. Mankins. Technological challenges in terms of array layout, single radiation element design, and overall efficiency, as well as the associated theoretical limits are presently a subject of research, as it was demonstrated by the Special Session on "Analysis of Electromagnetic Wireless Systems for Solar Power Transmission" held during the 2010 IEEE Symposium on Antennas and Propagation. In 2013, a useful overview was published, covering technologies and issues associated with microwave power transmission from space to ground. It includes an introduction to SPS, current research and future prospects. Moreover, a review of current methodologies and technologies for the design of antenna arrays for microwave power transmission appeared in the Proceedings of the IEEE.

=== Laser power beaming ===
Laser power beaming was envisioned by some at NASA as a stepping stone to further industrialization of space. In the 1980s, researchers at NASA worked on the potential use of lasers for space-to-space power beaming, focusing primarily on the development of a solar-powered laser. In 1989, it was suggested that power could also be usefully beamed by laser from Earth to space. In 1991, the SELENE project (SpacE Laser ENErgy) had begun, which included the study of laser power beaming for supplying power to a lunar base. The SELENE program was a two-year research effort, but the cost of taking the concept to operational status was too high, and the official project ended in 1993 before reaching a space-based demonstration.

=== Laser Solar Satellites ===
Laser Solar Satellites are smaller in size, meaning that they have to work as a group with other similar satellites. There are a number of pros to Laser Solar Satellites, specifically regarding their lower overall costs in comparison to other satellites. While the cost is lower than other satellites, there are various safety concerns, and other concerns regarding this satellite. Laser-emitting solar satellites only need to venture about 400 km into space, but because of their small generation capacity, hundreds or thousands of laser satellites would need to be launched in order to create a sustainable impact. A single satellite launch can range from fifty to four hundred million dollars. Lasers could be helpful for the energy from the sun harvested in space, to be returned to Earth in order for terrestrial power demands to be met.

=== Orbital location ===
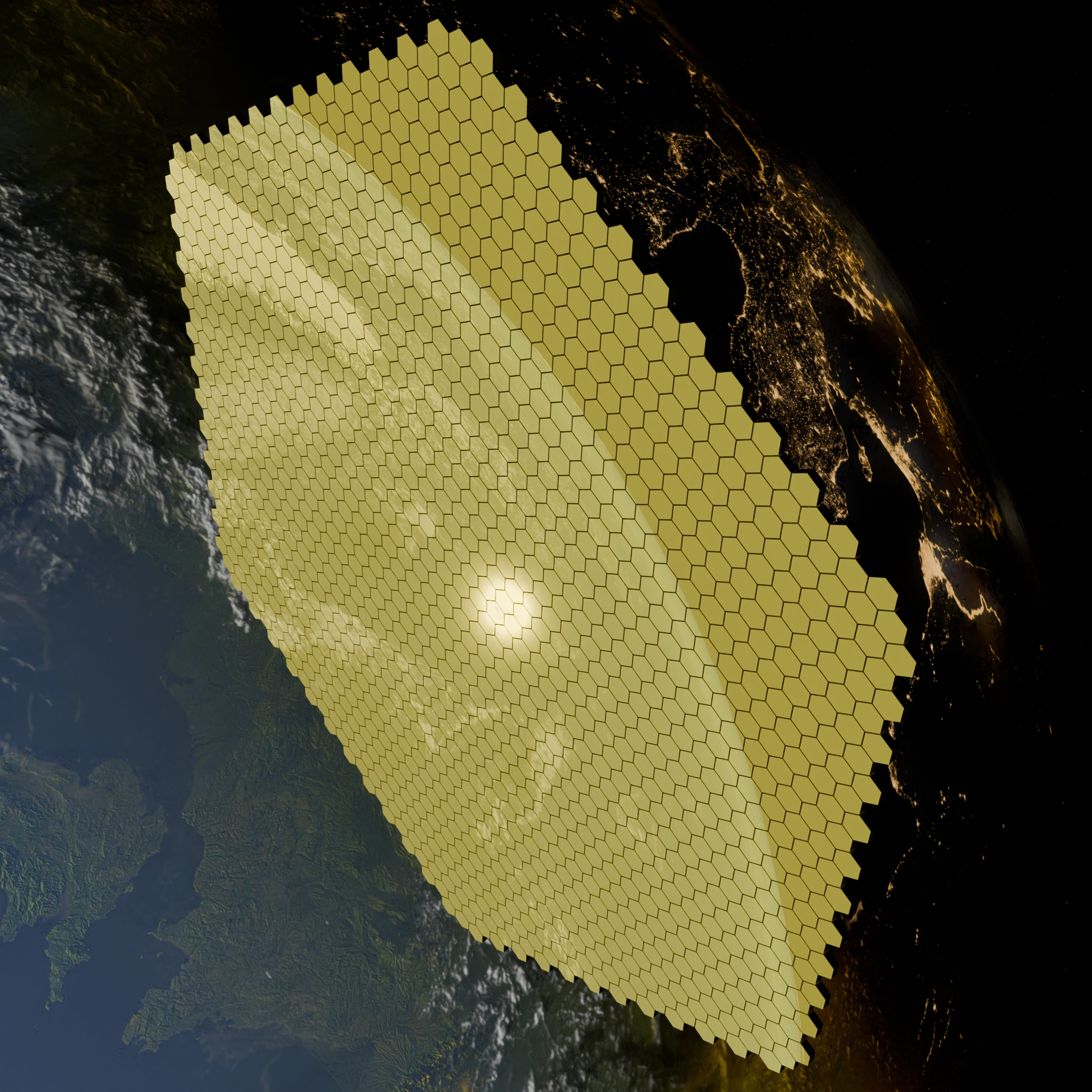
Design of a sun-synchronous orbit data center, they would orbit above the dawn / dusk transition of the planet.

The main advantage of locating a space power station in geostationary orbit is that the antenna geometry stays constant, and so keeping the antennas lined up is simpler. Another advantage is that nearly continuous power transmission is immediately available as soon as the first space power station is placed in orbit, LEO requires several satellites before they are producing nearly continuous power.

Power beaming from geostationary orbit by microwaves carries the difficulty that the required 'optical aperture' sizes are large. For example, the 1978 NASA SPS study required a 1 km diameter transmitting antenna and a 10 km diameter receiving rectenna for a microwave beam at 2.45 GHz. These sizes can be somewhat decreased by using shorter wavelengths, although they have increased atmospheric absorption and even potential beam blockage by rain or water droplets. Because of the thinned array curse, it is not possible to make a narrower beam by combining the beams of several smaller satellites. The large size of the transmitting and receiving antennas means that the minimum practical power level for an SPS will necessarily be high; small SPS systems will be possible, but uneconomic.

A collection of LEO (low Earth orbit) space power stations has been proposed as a precursor to GEO (geostationary orbit) space-based solar power.

=== Earth-based receiver ===
The Earth-based rectenna would likely consist of many short dipole antennas connected via diodes. Microwave broadcasts from the satellite would be received in the dipoles with about 85% efficiency. With a conventional microwave antenna, the reception efficiency is better, but its cost and complexity are also considerably greater. Rectennas would likely be several kilometers across.

=== In space applications ===
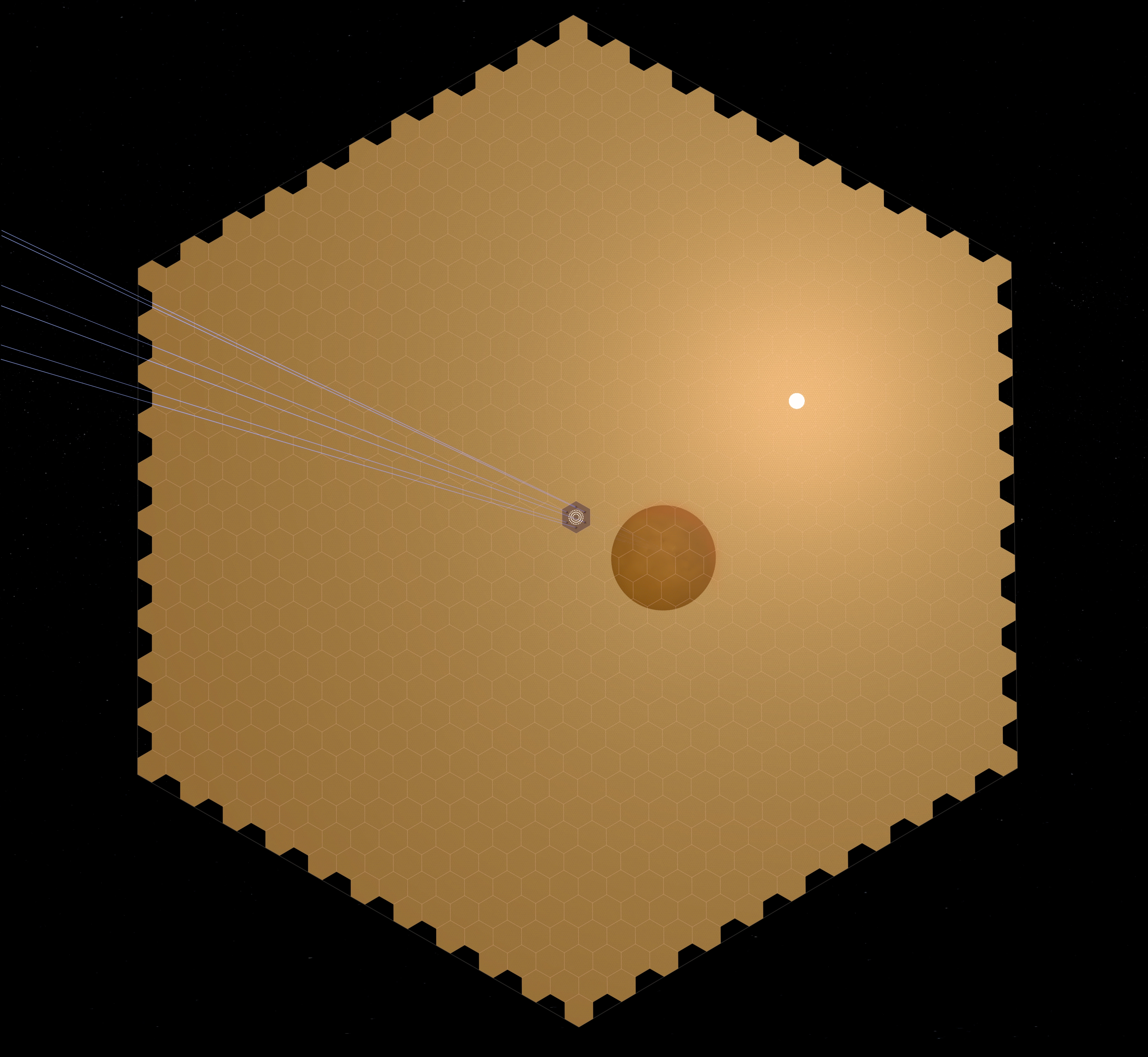
3D design of a Mars geostationary solar power system

A laser SBSP could also power a base or vehicles on the surface of the Moon or Mars, saving on mass costs to land the power source. A spacecraft or another satellite could also be powered by the same means. In a 2012 report presented to NASA on space solar power, the author mentions another potential use for the technology behind space solar power could be for solar electric propulsion systems that could be used for interplanetary human exploration missions.

== Launch costs ==
One problem with the SBSP concept is the cost of space launches and the amount of material that would need to be launched.

Much of the material launched need not be delivered to its eventual orbit immediately, which raises the possibility that high efficiency (but slower) engines could move SPS material from LEO to GEO at an acceptable cost. Examples include ion thrusters or nuclear propulsion. Infrastructure including solar panels, power converters, and power transmitters will have to be built in order to begin the process. This will be extremely expensive and maintaining them will cost even more.

To give an idea of the scale of the problem, assuming a solar panel mass of 20 kg per kilowatt (without considering the mass of the supporting structure, antenna, or any significant mass reduction of any focusing mirrors) a 4 GW power station would weigh about 80,000 metric tons, all of which would, in current circumstances, be launched from the Earth. This is, however, far from the state of the art for flown spacecraft, which as of 2015 was 150 W/kg (6.7 kg/kW), and improving rapidly. Lightweight designs could likely achieve 1 kg/kW, meaning 4,000 metric tons for the solar panels for the same 4 GW capacity station. Beyond the mass of the panels, overhead (including boosting to the desired orbit and stationkeeping) must be added.

Launch costs for 4 GW to LEO
	1 kg/kW	5 kg/kW	20 kg/kW
$1/kg (Minimum cost at ~$0.13/kWh power, 100% efficiency)	$4M	$20M	$80M
$2000/kg (ex: Falcon Heavy)	$8B	$40B	$160B
$10000/kg (ex: Ariane V)	$40B	$200B	$800B

To these costs must be added the environmental impact of heavy space launch missions, if such costs are to be used in comparison to earth-based energy production. For comparison, the direct cost of a new coal or nuclear power plant ranges from $3 billion to $6 billion per GW (not including the full cost to the environment from CO_{2} emissions or storage of spent nuclear fuel, respectively).

== Building from space ==
=== From lunar materials launched in orbit ===
Gerard O'Neill, noting the problem of high launch costs in the early 1970s, proposed building the SPS's in orbit with materials from the Moon. Launch costs from the Moon are potentially much lower than from Earth because of the lower gravity and lack of atmospheric drag. This 1970s proposal assumed the then-advertised future launch costing of NASA's space shuttle. This approach would require substantial upfront capital investment to establish mass drivers on the Moon. Nevertheless, on 30 April 1979, the Final Report ("Lunar Resources Utilization for Space Construction") by General Dynamics' Convair Division, under NASA contract NAS9-15560, concluded that use of lunar resources would be cheaper than Earth-based materials for a system of as few as thirty solar power satellites of 10 GW capacity each.

In 1980, when it became obvious NASA's launch cost estimates for the space shuttle were grossly optimistic, O'Neill et al. published another route to manufacturing using lunar materials with much lower startup costs. This 1980s SPS concept relied less on human presence in space and more on partially self-replicating systems on the lunar surface under remote control of workers stationed on Earth. The high net energy gain of this proposal derives from the Moon's much shallower gravitational well.

Having a relatively cheap per pound source of raw materials from space would lessen the concern for low mass designs and result in a different sort of SPS being built. The low cost per pound of lunar materials in O'Neill's vision would be supported by using lunar material to manufacture more facilities in orbit than just solar power satellites. Advanced techniques for launching from the Moon may reduce the cost of building a solar power satellite from lunar materials. Some proposed techniques include the lunar mass driver and the lunar space elevator, first described by Jerome Pearson. It would require establishing silicon mining and solar cell manufacturing facilities on the Moon.

=== On the Moon ===
Physicist Dr David Criswell suggests the Moon is the optimum location for solar power stations, and promotes lunar-based solar power. The main advantage he envisions is construction largely from locally available lunar materials, using in-situ resource utilization, with a teleoperated mobile factory and crane to assemble the microwave reflectors, and rovers to assemble and pave solar cells, which would significantly reduce launch costs compared to SBSP designs. Power relay satellites orbiting around earth and the Moon reflecting the microwave beam are also part of the project. A demo project of 1 GW starts at $50 billion. The Shimizu Corporation use a combination of lasers and microwaves for the Luna Ring concept, along with power relay satellites.

=== From an asteroid ===
Asteroid mining has also been seriously considered. A NASA design study evaluated a 10,000-ton mining vehicle (to be assembled in orbit) that would return a 500,000-ton asteroid fragment to geostationary orbit. Only about 3,000 tons of the mining ship would be traditional aerospace-grade payload. The rest would be reaction mass for the mass-driver engine, which could be arranged to be the spent rocket stages used to launch the payload. Assuming that 100% of the returned asteroid was useful, and that the asteroid miner itself could not be reused, that represents nearly a 95% reduction in launch costs. However, the true merits of such a method would depend on a thorough mineral survey of the candidate asteroids; thus far, we have only estimates of their composition. One proposal is to capture the asteroid Apophis into Earth orbit and convert it into 150 solar power satellites of 5 GW each or the larger asteroid 1999 AN10, which is 50 times the size of Apophis and large enough to build 7,500 5-gigawatt solar power satellites

== Safety ==
The potential exposure of humans and animals on the ground to the high power microwave beams is a significant concern with these systems. At the Earth's surface, a suggested SPSP microwave beam would have a maximum intensity at its center, of 23 mW/cm^{2}. While this is less than 1/4 the solar irradiation constant, microwaves penetrate much deeper into tissue than sunlight, and at this level would exceed the current United States Occupational Safety and Health Act (OSHA) workplace exposure limits for microwaves at 10 mW/cm^{2} At 23 mW/cm^{2}, studies show humans experience significant deficits in spatial learning and memory. If the diameter of the proposed SPSP array is increased by 2.5x, the energy density on the ground increases to 1 W/cm^{2}. (Note: An increase in space array diameter of 2.5x increases the array element count by 6.25x, which increases total power transmitted by this factor. In addition for a coherent microwave beam, the ground spot area decreases by 6.25x, therefore the power density on ground increases by 6.25^{2} = 40x. This increases the proposed 23 W/cm^{2} to about 1 W/cm^{2}) At this level, the median lethal dose for mice is 30–60 seconds of microwave exposure. While designing an array with 2.5x larger diameter should be avoided, the dual-use military potential of such a system is readily apparent.

With good array sidelobe design, outside the receiver may be less than the OSHA long-term levels as over 95% of the beam energy will fall on the rectenna. However, any accidental or intentional mis-pointing of the satellite could be deadly to life on Earth within the beam.

Exposure to the beam can be minimized in various ways. On the ground, assuming the beam is pointed correctly, physical access must be controllable (e.g., via fencing). Typical aircraft flying through the beam provide passengers with a protective metal shell (i.e., a Faraday Cage), which will intercept the microwaves. Other aircraft (balloons, ultralight, etc.) can avoid exposure by using controlled airspace, as is currently done for military and other controlled airspace. In addition, a design constraint is that the microwave beam must not be so intense as to injure wildlife, particularly birds. Suggestions have been made to locate rectennas offshore, but this presents serious problems, including corrosion, mechanical stresses, and biological contamination.

A commonly proposed approach to ensuring fail-safe beam targeting is to use a retrodirective phased array antenna/rectenna. A "pilot" microwave beam emitted from the center of the rectenna on the ground establishes a phase front at the transmitting antenna. There, circuits in each of the antenna's subarrays compare the pilot beam's phase front with an internal clock phase to control the phase of the outgoing signal. If the phase offset to the pilot is chosen the same for all elements, the transmitted beam should be centered precisely on the rectenna and have a high degree of phase uniformity; if the pilot beam is lost for any reason (if the transmitting antenna is turned away from the rectenna, for example) the phase control value fails and the microwave power beam is automatically defocused. Such a system would not focus its power beam effectively anywhere that did not have a pilot beam transmitter. The long-term effects of beaming power through the ionosphere in the form of microwaves has yet to be studied.

== Timeline ==
=== In the 20th century ===
- 1941: Isaac Asimov published the science fiction short story "Reason," in which a space station transmits energy collected from the sun to various planets using microwave beams. "Reason" was published in the "Astounding Science Fiction" magazine.
- 1968: Peter Glaser introduces the concept of a "solar power satellite" system with square miles of solar collectors in high geosynchronous orbit for collection and conversion of sun's energy into a microwave beam to transmit usable energy to large receiving antennas (rectennas) on Earth for distribution.
- 1973: Peter Glaser is granted United States patent number 3,781,647 for his method of transmitting power over long distances using microwaves from a large (one square kilometer) antenna on the satellite to a much larger one on the ground, now known as a rectenna.
- 1978–1981: The United States Department of Energy and NASA examine the solar power satellite (SPS) concept extensively, publishing design and feasibility studies.
- 1987: Stationary High Altitude Relay Platform a Canadian experiment
- 1995–1997: NASA conducts a "Fresh Look" study of space solar power (SSP) concepts and technologies.
- 1998: The Space Solar Power Concept Definition Study (CDS) identifies credible, commercially viable SSP concepts, while pointing out technical and programmatic risks.
- 1998: Japan's space agency begins developing a space solar power system (SSPS), a program that continues to the present day.
- 1999: NASA's Space Solar Power Exploratory Research and Technology program (SERT, see below) begins.
- 2000: John Mankins of NASA testifies in the U.S. House of Representatives, saying "Large-scale SSP is a very complex integrated system of systems that requires numerous significant advances in current technology and capabilities. A technology roadmap has been developed that lays out potential paths for achieving all needed advances — albeit over several decades.

=== In the 21st century ===
- 2001: NASDA (One of Japan's national space agencies before it became part of JAXA) announces plans to perform additional research and prototyping by launching an experimental satellite with 10 kilowatts and 1 megawatt of power.
- 2003: ESA studies
- 2007: The US Pentagon's National Security Space Office (NSSO) issues a report on October 10, 2007 stating they intend to collect solar energy from space for use on Earth to help the United States' ongoing relationship with the Middle East and the battle for oil. A demo plant could cost $10 billion, produce 10 megawatts, and become operational in 10 years.
- 2007: In May 2007, a workshop is held at the US Massachusetts Institute of Technology (MIT) to review the current state of the SBSP market and technology.
- 2010: Professors Andrea Massa and Giorgio Franceschetti announce a special session on the "Analysis of Electromagnetic Wireless Systems for Solar Power Transmission" at the 2010 Institute of Electrical and Electronics Engineers International Symposium on Antennas and Propagation.
- 2010: The Indian Space Research Organisation and US' National Space Society launched a joint forum to enhance partnership in harnessing solar energy through space-based solar collectors. Called the Kalam-NSS Initiative after the former Indian President Dr APJ Abdul Kalam, the forum will lay the groundwork for the space-based solar power program which could see other countries joining in as well.
- 2010: Sky's No Limit: Space-Based solar power, the next major step in the Indo-US strategic partnership? written by USAF Lt Col Peter Garretson was published at the Institute for Defence Studies and Analysis.
- 2012: China proposed joint development between India and China towards developing a solar power satellite, during a visit by former Indian President Dr APJ Abdul Kalam.
- 2015: The Space Solar Power Initiative (SSPI) is established between Caltech and Northrop Grumman Corporation. An estimated $17.5 million is to be provided over a three-year project for development of a space-based solar power system.
- 2015: JAXA announced on 12 March 2015 that they wirelessly beamed 1.8 kilowatts 50 meters to a small receiver by converting electricity to microwaves and then back to electricity.
- 2016: Lt Gen. Zhang Yulin, deputy chief of the [PLA] armament development department of the Central Military Commission, suggested that China would next begin to exploit Earth-Moon space for industrial development. The goal would be the construction of space-based solar power satellites that would beam energy back to Earth.
- 2016: A team with membership from the Naval Research Laboratory (NRL), Defense Advanced Projects Agency (DARPA), Air Force Air University, Joint Staff Logistics (J-4), Department of State, Makins Aerospace and Northrop Grumman won the Secretary of Defense (SECDEF) / Secretary of State (SECSTATE) / USAID Director's agency-wide D3 (Diplomacy, Development, Defense) Innovation Challenge with a proposal that the US must lead in space solar power. The proposal was followed by a vision video
- 2016: Citizens for Space-Based Solar Power has transformed the D3 proposal into active petitions on the White House Website "America Must Lead the Transition to Space-Based Energy"and Change.org "USA Must Lead the Transition to Space-Based Energy" along with the following video.
- 2016: Erik Larson and others from NOAA produce a paper "Global atmospheric response to emissions from a proposed reusable space launch system" The paper makes a case that up to 2 TW/year of power satellites could be constructed without intolerable damage to the atmosphere. Before this paper, there was concern that the NO_{x} produced by reentry would destroy too much ozone.
- 2016: Ian Cash of SICA Design proposes CASSIOPeiA (Constant Aperture, Solid State, Integrated, Orbital Phased Array) a new concept SPS Faculty Listing | Electrical and Computer Engineering
- 2017: NASA selects five new research proposals focused on investments in space. The Colorado School of Mines focuses on "21st Century Trends in Space-Based Solar Power Generation and Storage."
- 2019: Aditya Baraskar and Prof Toshiya Hanada from Space System Dynamic Laboratory, Kyushu University proposed Energy Orbit (E-Orbit), a small Space Solar Power Satellite constellation for power beaming between satellites in low earth orbit. A total of 1600 satellites to transmit 10 kilowatts of electricity in a 500 km radius at an altitude of 900 km.
- 2019: China creates a test base for SBSP, and announces plan to launch a working megawatt-grade 200-tonne SBSP station by 2035.
- 2020: US Naval Research Laboratory launches test satellite. Also the USAF has its Space Solar Power Incremental Demonstrations and Research Project (SSPIDR) planning to launch the ARACHNE test satellite. Arachne is due to launch in 2024.
- 2021: Caltech announces that it planned to launch a SBSP test array by 2023.
- 2022: The Space Energy Initiative in the UK announced to launch the first power station in space during the mid-2040s, to "provide 30 percent of the UK’s (greatly increased) electricity demand" and "to slash the UK’s dependence on fossil fuels" and foreign ties.
- 2022: The European Space Agency proposed a program called SOLARIS to operate Solar Power Satellites from 2030.
- 2023: On March 3, 2023, Caltech's MAPLE experiment (done by a team led by Ali Hajimiri) as a part of Space Solar Power Demonstrator (SSPD-1) demonstrates wireless power beaming in space for the first time by selectively directing power to two different receivers in space. Additionally, it beams "detectable power" to Earth.
- 2025: Researchers at King's College London estimate that by 2050 space based solar could provide Europe the majority of its renewable energy needs.

== Non-typical configurations and architectural considerations ==
The typical reference system-of-systems involves a significant number (several thousand multi-gigawatt systems to service all or a significant portion of Earth's energy requirements) of individual satellites in GEO. The typical reference design for the individual satellite is in the 1-10 GW range and usually involves planar or concentrated solar photovoltaics (PV) as the energy collector / conversion. The most typical transmission designs are in the 1–10 GHz (2.45 or 5.8 GHz) RF band where there are minimum losses in the atmosphere. Materials for the satellites are sourced from, and manufactured on Earth and expected to be transported to LEO via re-usable rocket launch, and transported between LEO and GEO via chemical or electrical propulsion. In summary, the architecture choices are:

- Location = GEO
- Energy Collection = PV
- Satellite = Monolithic Structure
- Transmission = RF
- Materials & Manufacturing = Earth
- Installation = RLVs to LEO, Chemical to GEO

There are several interesting design variants from the reference system:

Alternate energy collection location: While GEO is most typical because of its advantages of nearness to Earth, simplified pointing and tracking, small time in occultation, and scalability to meet all global demand several times over, other locations have been proposed:

- Sun Earth L1: Robert Kennedy III, Ken Roy & David Fields have proposed a variant of the L1 sunshade called "Dyson Dots" where a multi-terawatt primary collector would beam energy back to a series of LEO sun-synchronous receiver satellites. The much farther distance to Earth requires a correspondingly larger transmission aperture.
- Lunar surface: David Criswell has proposed using the Lunar surface itself as the collection medium, beaming power to the ground via a series of microwave reflectors in Earth Orbit. The chief advantage of this approach would be the ability to manufacture the solar collectors in-situ without the energy cost and complexity of launch. Disadvantages include the much longer distance, requiring larger transmission systems, the required "overbuild" to deal with the lunar night, and the difficulty of sufficient manufacturing and pointing of reflector satellites.
- MEO: MEO systems have been proposed for in-space utilities and beam-power propulsion infrastructures. For example, see Royce Jones' paper.
- Highly elliptical orbits: Molniya, Tundra, or Quazi Zenith orbits have been proposed as early locations for niche markets, requiring less energy to access and providing good persistence.
- Sun-sync LEO: In this near Polar Orbit, the satellites precess at a rate that allows them to always face the Sun as they rotate around Earth. This is an easy to access orbit requiring far less energy, and its proximity to Earth requires smaller (and therefore less massive) transmitting apertures. However disadvantages to this approach include having to constantly shift receiving stations, or storing energy for a burst transmission. This orbit is already crowded and has significant space debris.
- Equatorial LEO: Japan's SPS 2000 proposed an early demonstrator in equatorial LEO in which multiple equatorial participating nations could receive some power.
- Earth's surface: Narayan Komerath has proposed a space power grid where excess energy from an existing grid or power plant on one side of the planet can be passed up to orbit, across to another satellite and down to receivers.

Energy collection: The most typical designs for solar power satellites include photovoltaics. These may be planar (and usually passively cooled), concentrated (and perhaps actively cooled). However, there are multiple interesting variants.

- Solar thermal: Proponents of solar thermal have proposed using concentrated heating to cause a state change in a fluid to extract energy via rotating machinery followed by cooling in radiators. Advantages of this method might include overall system mass (disputed), eliminating degradation due to solar-wind damage, and radiation tolerance. One recent thermal solar power satellite design by Keith Henson and others has been visualized here. Thermal Space Solar Power concept A related concept is here: Beamed Energy Bootstrapping The proposed radiators are thin wall plastic tube filled with low pressure (2.4 kPa) and temperature (20 deg C) steam.
- Solar pumped laser: Japan has pursued a solar-pumped laser, where sunlight directly excites the lasing medium used to create the coherent beam to Earth.
- Stellaser: A hypothetical concept of a large laser where a star provides both the lasing energy and the lasing medium, producing a steerable energy beam of unrivaled power.
- Fusion decay: This version of a power-satellite is not "solar". Rather, the vacuum of space is seen as a "feature not a bug" for traditional fusion. Per Paul Werbos, after fusion even neutral particles decay to charged particles which in a sufficiently large volume would allow direct conversion to current.
- Solar wind loop: Also called a Dyson–Harrop satellite. Here the satellite makes use not of the photons from the Sun but rather the charged particles in the solar wind which via electro-magnetic coupling generate a current in a large loop.
- Direct mirrors: Early concepts for direct mirror re-direction of light to planet Earth suffered from the problem that rays coming from the sun are not parallel but are expanding from a disk and so the size of the spot on the Earth is quite large. Lewis Fraas has explored an array of parabolic mirrors to augment existing solar arrays.

Alternate satellite architecture: The typical satellite is a monolithic structure composed of a structural truss, one or more collectors, one or more transmitters, and occasionally primary and secondary reflectors. The entire structure may be gravity gradient stabilized. Alternative designs include:

- Swarms of smaller satellites: Some designs propose swarms of free-flying smaller satellites. This is the case with several laser designs, and appears to be the case with CALTECH's Flying Carpets. For RF designs, an engineering constraint is the thinned array problem.
- Free floating components: Solaren has proposed an alternative to the monolithic structure where the primary reflector and transmission reflector are free-flying.
- Spin stabilization: NASA explored a spin-stabilized thin film concept.
- Photonic laser thruster (PLT) stabilized structure: Young Bae has proposed that photon pressure may substitute for compressive members in large structures.

Transmission: The most typical design for energy transmission is via an RF antenna at below 10 GHz to a rectenna on the ground. Controversy exists between the benefits of Klystrons, Gyrotrons, Magnetrons and solid state. Alternate transmission approaches include:

- Laser: Lasers offer the advantage of much lower cost and mass to first power, however there is controversy regarding benefits of efficiency. Lasers allow for much smaller transmitting and receiving apertures. However, a highly concentrated beam has eye-safety, fire safety, and weaponization concerns. Proponents believe they have answers to all these concerns. A laser-based approach must also find alternate ways of coping with clouds and precipitation.
- Atmospheric waveguide: Some have proposed it may be possible to use a short pulse laser to create an atmospheric waveguide through which concentrated microwaves could flow.
- Nuclear synthesis: Particle accelerators based in the inner solar system (whether in orbit or on a planet such as Mercury) could use solar energy to synthesize nuclear fuel from naturally occurring materials. While this would be highly inefficient using current technology (in terms of the amount of energy needed to manufacture the fuel compared to the amount of energy contained in the fuel) and would raise obvious nuclear safety issues, the basic technology upon which such an approach would rely on has been in use for decades, making this possibly the most reliable means of sending energy especially over long distances - in particular, from the inner solar system to the outer solar system.

Materials and manufacturing: Typical designs make use of the developed industrial manufacturing system extant on Earth, and use Earth based materials both for the satellite and propellant. Variants include:

- Lunar materials: Designs exist for Solar Power Satellites that source >99% of materials from lunar regolith with small inputs of "vitamins" from other locations. Using materials from the Moon is attractive because launch from the Moon is in theory far less complicated than from Earth. There is no atmosphere, and so components do not need to be packed tightly in an aeroshell and survive vibration, pressure and temperature loads. Launch may be via a magnetic mass driver and bypass the requirement to use propellant for launch entirely. Launch from the Moon the GEO also requires far less energy than from Earth's much deeper gravity well. Building all the solar power satellites to fully supply all the required energy for the entire planet requires less than one millionth of the mass of the Moon.
- Self-replication on the Moon: NASA explored a self-replicating factory on the Moon in the early 1980s. More recently, Justin Lewis-Webber proposed a method of speciated manufacture of core elements based upon John Mankins SPS-Alpha design.
- Asteroidal materials: Some asteroids are thought to have even lower Delta-V to recover materials than the Moon, and some particular materials of interest such as metals may be more concentrated or easier to access.
- In-space/in-situ manufacturing: With the advent of in-space additive manufacturing, concepts such as SpiderFab might allow mass launch of raw materials for local extrusion.

Method of installation / Transportation of Material to Energy Collection Location: In the reference designs, component material is launched via well-understood chemical rockets (usually fully reusable launch systems) to LEO, after which either chemical or electrical propulsion is used to carry them to GEO. The desired characteristics for this system is high mass-flow at low total cost. Alternate concepts include:

- Lunar chemical launch: ULA has recently showcased a concept for a fully re-usable chemical lander XEUS to move materials from the Lunar surface to LLO or GEO.
- Lunar mass driver: Launch of materials from the lunar surface using a system similar to an aircraft carrier electromagnetic catapult. An unexplored compact alternative would be the slingatron.
- Lunar space elevator: An equatorial or near-equatorial cable extends to and through the lagrange point. This is claimed by proponents to be lower in mass than a traditional mass driver.
- Space elevator: A ribbon of pure carbon nanotubes extends from its center of gravity in Geostationary orbit, allowing climbers to climb up to GEO. Problems with this include the material challenge of creating a ribbon of such length (36,000 km!) with adequate strength, management of collisions with satellites and space debris, and lightning.
- MEO Skyhook: As part of an AFRL study, Roger Lenard proposed a MEO Skyhook. It appears that a gravity gradient-stabilized tether with its center of mass in MEO can be constructed of available materials. The bottom of the skyhook is close to the atmosphere in a "non-keplerian orbit". A re-usable rocket can launch to match altitude and speed with the bottom of the tether which is in a non-keplerian orbit (travelling much slower than typical orbital speed). The payload is transferred and it climbs the cable. The cable itself is kept from de-orbiting via electric propulsion and/or electromagnetic effects.
- MAGLEV launch / StarTram: John Powell has a concept for a high mass-flow system. In a first-gen system, built into a mountain, accelerates a payload through an evacuated MAGLEV track. A small on-board rocket circularizes the payload.
- Beamed energy launch: Kevin Parkin and Escape Dynamics both have concepts for ground-based irradiation of a mono-propellant launch vehicle using RF energy. The RF energy is absorbed and directly heats the propellant not unlike in NERVA-style nuclear-thermal. LaserMotive has a concept for a laser-based approach.

== Gallery ==
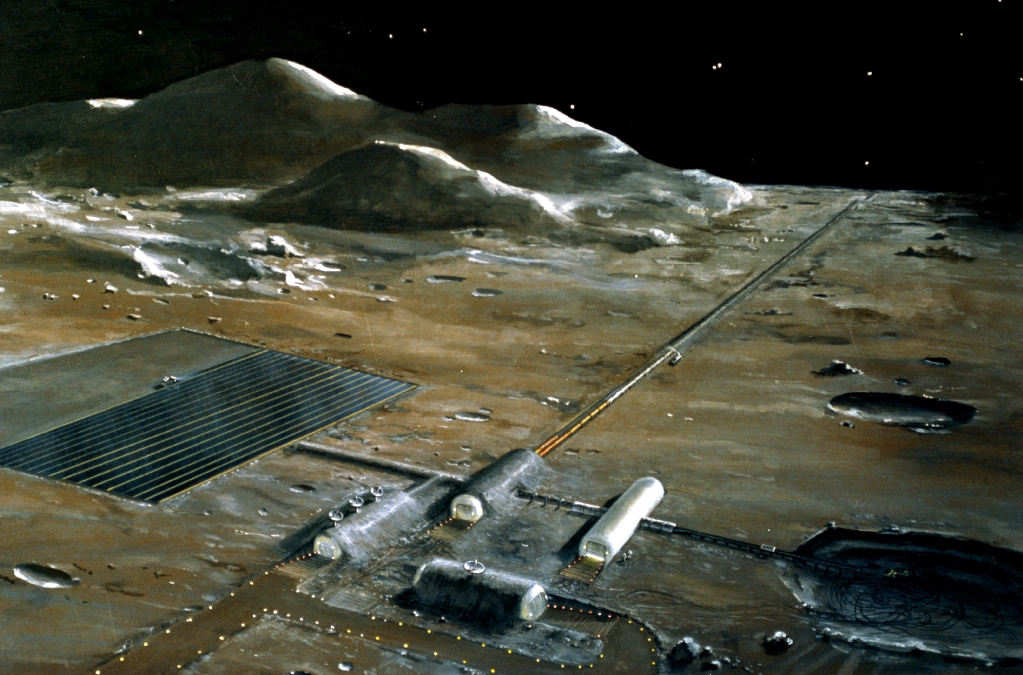
A Lunar base with a mass driver (the long structure that goes toward the horizon). NASA conceptual illustration

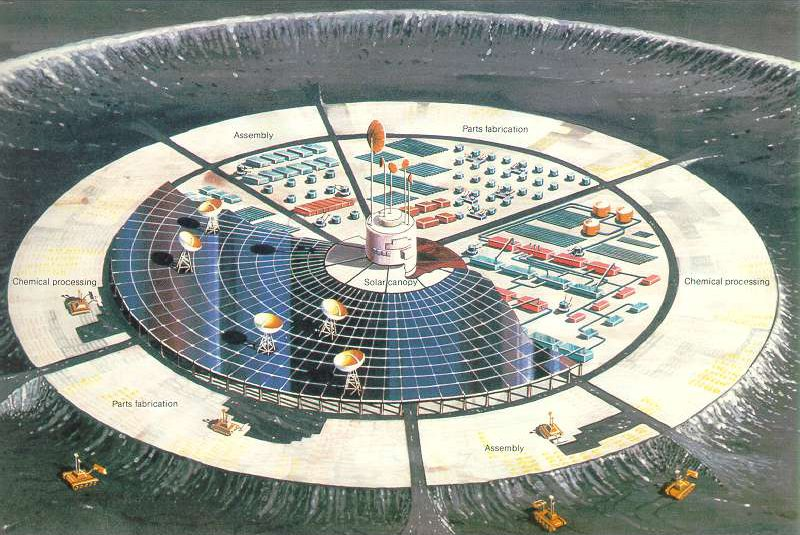
An artist's conception of a "self-growing" robotic lunar factory.

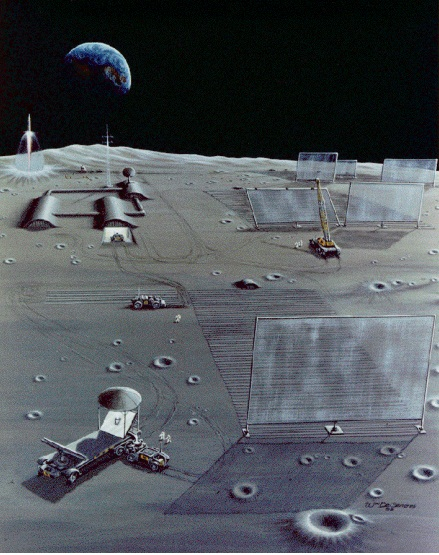
Microwave reflectors on the moon and teleoperated robotic paving rover and crane.

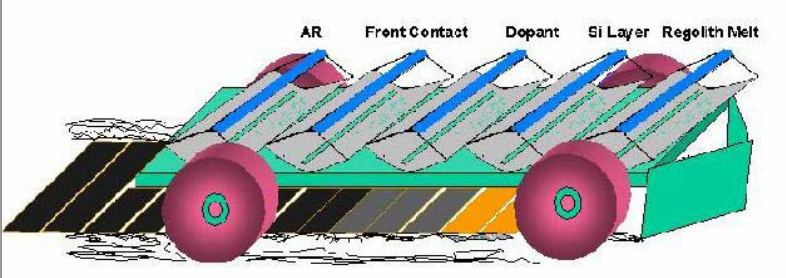
"Crawler" traverses Lunar surface, smoothing, melting a top layer of regolith, then depositing elements of silicon PV cells directly on surface

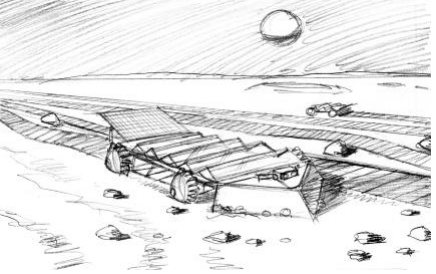
Sketch of the Lunar Crawler to be used for fabrication of lunar solar cells on the surface of the Moon.

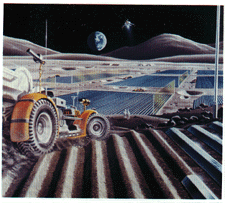
Shown here is an array of solar collectors that convert power into microwave beams directed toward Earth.

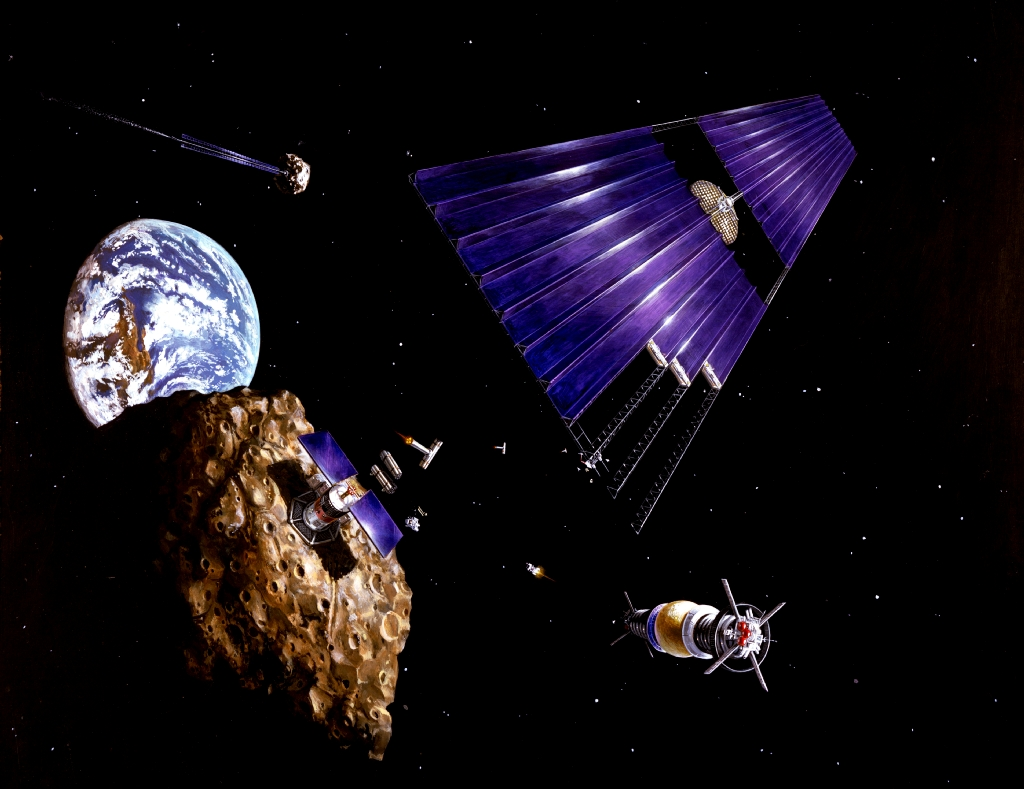
A solar power satellite built from a mined asteroid.

== See also ==
- Attitude dynamics and control – Process of controlling orientation of an aerospace vehicle
- Friis transmission equation – Formula in telecommunications engineering of antenna performance
- Future energy development – Methods bringing energy into production
- Orbital station-keeping – Maintenance of a particular orbit
- Project Earth (TV series) – 2008 television series
- Solaris SBSP – Space based solar power project
- Space-based data center
- Space mirror (climate engineering) – Artificial satellites designed to change the amount of solar radiation that impacts Earth
- Znamya – Russian orbital mirror experiments in the 1990s
