= Solaris (solar power) =

Space based solar power project

SOLARIS is a space-based solar power (SBSP) proposal of the European Space Agency (ESA).

The proposal calls for an in-orbit demonstration in approximately 2030, the first operational station in geostationary orbit by 2040 with subsequent stations added afterwards. Each modular solar panel would be almost one 1km wide, with ground receiving antennas about 6km wide each, generating up to a petawatt of power. The program is estimated to be able to supply between a 7th and a 3rd of Europe's current power demand, or 10% of its predicted demand by 2050.

At its November 2022 ministerial council meeting ESA sought funding of a three-year study into the proposal. Having successfully received that approval, in 2023 it commissioned Arthur D. Little and Thales Alenia Space Italy to independently develop "concept studies" for commercial-scale SBSP plants. The "economic, political, and technological feasibility" of continuing the project will be re-assessed at the next ministerial council, in 2025.

In preparation for the 2022 three-year study request, ESA separately commissioned consulting firms Frazer-Nash (UK) and Roland Berger (Germany) assess the potential of the scheme to support the European policy goal of a net-zero carbon economy by 2050:

The Frazer-Nash study estimated that the net present value of a European SBSP system from 2022 to 2070 would range between 149 billion and 262 billion euros ($150–264 billion). A central case of 54 “gigawatt-class” SBSP satellites would produce 601 billion euros in benefits in that period, primarily from avoided costs of producing energy terrestrially along with its carbon dioxide emissions, with 418 billion euros in costs to develop and operate the SBSP system.

The Roland Berger study concluded that a single SBSP satellite, based on an existing design, could cost as little as 8.1 billion euros to build and 7.5 billion euros to operate for 30 years, assuming “substantial advances” in key technologies. In a worst-case scenario without those advances, the same design would cost 33.4 billion euros to build and 31.1 billion euros to operate. Despite the uncertainty, it concluded SBSP “has strong potential to become a competitive renewable technology.”

Criticisms of SOLARIS and other SBSP schemes, even by their proponents, include challenges in at least three areas: whether it is possible to build the technology and logistics required to launch, remotely-assemble, and operate massive satellites; the "policy implications associated with beaming power from space"; and whether it is affordable. Important factors in increasing the feasibility of the proposal has been the recent rapidly decrease in launch cost, as well as advances in robotic manufacturing and wireless energy transfer. A 2022 tests in Germany for the SOLARIS program demonstrated the ability to wirelessly beam power across a distance of 36m, however there is "still a way to go" before it is possible to achieve the same from the distance of geostationary orbit. Earlier in the same year, both the China Academy of Space Technology and the NASA Office of Technology, Policy and Strategy had each approved studies and tests in components of similar schemes.
