= Dyson–Harrop satellite =

Hypothetical megastructure intended for power generation

A Dyson–Harrop satellite is a hypothetical megastructure intended for power generation using the solar wind. It is inspired by the Dyson sphere, but much harder to detect from another star system. The satellite develops a useful voltage potential by capturing positive ions against a solar sail for a net positive voltage, while draining off electrons on a long wire, and guiding flux electrons along a short wire into a charge receiver for a net negative voltage. The voltage difference between the charge receiver and the solar sail is used to power a laser or microwave transmitter for power transfer off-board the satellite.

The concept for the so-called Dyson–Harrop satellite begins with a long metal wire loop pointed at the Sun. This wire is charged to generate a cylindrical magnetic field that snags the electrons that make up half the solar wind. These electrons get funneled into a metal spherical receiver to produce a current, which generates the wire's magnetic field – making the system self-sustaining. Any current not needed for the magnetic field powers an infrared laser trained on satellite dishes back on Earth, designed to collect the energy. Earth's air does not absorb infra-red light, so the system would be highly efficient. Back on the satellite, the current has been drained of its electrical energy by the laser – the electrons fall onto a ring-shaped sail, where incoming sunlight can excite them enough to keep the satellite in orbit around the Sun.

A relatively small Dyson–Harrop satellite using a 1-centimetre-wide copper wire 300 metres long, a receiver 2 metres wide and a sail 10 metres in diameter, sitting at roughly the same distance from the Sun as the Earth, could generate 1.7 megawatts of power – enough for about 1000 family homes in the US. Larger sizes could produce far greater amounts of power, even exceeding the current usage of Earth. Satellites could be placed anywhere in the Solar System, and networks of satellites could combine to generate terawatts of power.
