= Rotovator =

Rotavator can mean:

- Momentum exchange tether § Rotavator, an alternative name for a tether propulsion apparatus, a proposed method of lifting materials into orbit using very long tethers attached to a rotating satellite
- Rotavator, an alternative name for a rotary tiller, a machine for digging earth, named from a manufacturer of such implements
