= Tethers Unlimited, Inc. =

Tethers Unlimited
- Type: Private
- Industry: Aerospace
- Founded: 1994
- Founder: Robert L. Forward, Robert P. Hoyt
- Headquarters: Bothell, WA, United States
- Key people: Robert P. Hoyt
- Products: space tethers, orbital robotic assembly and fabrication technologies
- Number of employees: ~50 (2019)
- Website: arka.org

Tethers Unlimited, Inc. (TUI) is an American private aerospace company headquartered near Seattle, Washington, which performs research and development of new products and technologies for space, sea, and air.

Founded in 1994 by Robert P. Hoyt and Robert L. Forward, Tethers Unlimited began developing products based on space tether technologies, including concepts for removal of space debris and momentum exchange tethers for launching payloads into higher orbits.

In 2007, in collaboration with Stanford University, the company launched the Multi-Application Survivable Tether (MAST) experiment to test the survivability of tethers in space. In 2016 it was reported by SpaceNews and Yahoo that the company's subdivision Firmamentum signed a deal with SSL to fly its in-space manufacturing technologies on SSL's Dragonfly program which is funded by NASA's Tipping point initiative.

In December 2018 it was reported that Tethers Unlimited delivered a Refabricator to the ISS that accepts plastic material and converts it into high-quality 3D printer filament, for the mission duration of October 2018 to April 2019.

On May 6, 2020 it was announced that Amergint Technologies acquired Tethers Unlimited, and Amergint and Tethers Unlimited are now subsidiaries of Arka (also based in Colorado).

== See also ==
- Made In Space, Inc.
- Varda Space Industries
- NewSpace
