= Planet Ring =

Planet Ring may refer to:

- Planet Ring (video game), a 2000 SEGA Dreamcast game
- Planetary ring or ringed planet, an astronomical phenomenon

== See also ==
- Orbital ring, a speculative mega-structure
