= Specific strength =

Ratio of strength to mass for a material

The specific strength is a material's (or muscle's) strength (force per unit area at failure) divided by its density. It is also known as the strength-to-weight ratio or strength/weight ratio or strength-to-mass ratio. In fiber or textile applications, tenacity is the usual measure of specific strength. The SI unit for specific strength is Pa⋅m^{3}/kg, or N⋅m/kg, which is dimensionally equivalent to m^{2}/s^{2}, though the latter form is rarely used. Specific strength has the same units as specific energy, and is related to the maximum specific energy of rotation that an object can have without flying apart due to centrifugal force.

Another way to describe specific strength is breaking length, also known as self support length: the maximum length of a vertical column of the material (assuming a fixed cross-section) that could suspend its own weight when supported only at the top. For this measurement, the definition of weight is the force of gravity at the Earth's surface (standard gravity, 9.80665 m/s^{2}) applying to the entire length of the material, not diminishing with height. This usage is more common with certain specialty fiber or textile applications.

The materials with the highest specific strengths are typically fibers such as carbon fiber, glass fiber, and various polymers, and these are frequently used to make composite materials (e.g. carbon fiber-epoxy). These materials, and others such as titanium, aluminium, magnesium, and high strength steel alloys, are widely used in aerospace and other applications where weight savings are worth the higher material cost.

Note that strength and stiffness are distinct. Both are important in design of efficient and safe structures.

== Calculations of breaking length ==
$$L=\frac{T_s}{\mathbf{g}\rho}$$

where L is the length, T_{s} is the tensile strength, ρ is the density, and g is the acceleration due to gravity (≈ 9.8 m/s^{2})

== Examples ==
Specific tensile strength of various materials
Material	Tensile strength (MPa)	Density (g/cm^{3})	Specific strength (kN·m/kg)	Breaking length (km)	Source
Concrete	2–5	2.30	5.22	0.44	
Polyoxymethylene; POM	69	1.42	49	4.95	
Rubber	15	0.92	16.3	1.66	
Copper	220	8.92	24.7	2.51	
Polypropylene; PP	25–40	0.90	28–44	2.8–4.5	
(Poly)acrylonitrile-butadiene-styrene; ABS	41–45	1.05	39–43		
Polyethylene terephthalate; polyester; PET	80	1.3–1.4	57–62		
Piano wire; ASTM 228 Steel	1590–3340	7.8	204–428		
Polylactic acid; polylactide; PLA	53	1.24	43		
Low carbon steel (AISI 1010)	365	7.87	46.4	4.73	
Stainless steel (304)	505	8.00	63.1	6.4	
Maraging steel (18Ni(350))	2450	8.2	298.78	29.7	
Brass	580	8.55	67.8	6.91	
Nylon	78	1.13	69.0	7.04	
Titanium	344	4.51	76	7.75	
CrMo Steel (4130)	560–670	7.85	71–85	7.27–8.70	
Aluminium alloy (6061-T6)	310	2.70	115	11.70	
Oak	90	0.78–0.69	115–130	12–13	
Inconel (X-750)	1250	8.28	151	15.4	
Magnesium alloy	275	1.74	158	16.1	
Aluminium alloy (7075-T6)	572	2.81	204	20.8	
Pine wood (American eastern white)	78	0.35	223	22.7	
Titanium alloy (Beta C)	1250	4.81	260	26.5	
Bainite	2500	7.87	321	32.4	
Reversibly Assembled Cellular Composite Materials	0.073	0.0072	10,139	1035	
Self-Reprogrammable Mechanical Metamaterials	0.01117	0.0103	1,084	111	
Balsa	73	0.14	521	53.2	
Carbon–epoxy composite	1240	1.58	785	80.0	
Spider silk	1400	1.31	1,069	109	
Silicon carbide fiber	3440	3.16	1,088	110	
Miralon carbon nanotube yarn C-series	1375	0.7–0.9	1,100	112	
Glass fiber	3400	2.60	1,307	133	
Basalt fiber	4840	2.70	1,790	183	
1 μm iron whiskers	14000	7.87	1,800	183	
Vectran	2900	1.40	2,071	211	
Carbon fiber (AS4)	4300	1.75	2,457	250	
Kevlar	3620	1.44	2,514	256	
Dyneema (UHMWPE)	3600	0.97	3,711	378	
Zylon	5800	1.54	3,766	384	
Carbon fiber (Toray T1100G)	7000	1.79	3,911	399	
Carbon nanotube (see note below)	62000	0.037–1.34	46,268–N/A	4716–N/A	
Colossal carbon tube	6900	0.116	59,483	6066	
Graphene	130500	2.090	62,453	6366	
Fundamental limit			9×10^{13}	9.2×10^{12}	

The data of this table is from best cases, and has been established for giving a rough figure.

Note: Multiwalled carbon nanotubes have the highest tensile strength of any material yet measured, with labs producing them at a tensile strength of 63 GPa, still well below their theoretical limit of 300 GPa. The first nanotube ropes (20 mm long) whose tensile strength was published (in 2000) had a strength of 3.6 GPa, still well below their theoretical limit. The density is different depending on the manufacturing method, and the lowest value is 0.037 or 0.55 (solid).

== Fundamental limit on specific strength ==
The null energy condition places a fundamental limit on the specific strength of any material. The specific strength is bounded to be no greater than c^{2} ≈ 9×10^{13} kN⋅m/kg, where c is the speed of light. This limit is achieved by electric and magnetic field lines, QCD flux tubes, and the fundamental strings hypothesized by string theory.

== Tenacity (textile strength) ==
Tenacity is the customary measure of strength of a fiber or yarn. It is usually defined as the ultimate (breaking) force of the fiber (in gram-force units) divided by the denier. Because denier is a measure of the linear density, the tenacity works out to be not a measure of force per unit area, but rather a quasi-dimensionless measure analogous to specific strength. A tenacity of $1$ corresponds to: $\frac{1 {\rm \, g} \cdot 9.80665 {\rm \, m s^{-2}}}{1 {\rm \, g}/9000 {\rm \, m}}=\frac{9.80665 {\rm \, m s^{-2}}}{1/9000 {\rm \, m}}=9.80665 {\rm \, m s^{-2}} \, 9000 {\rm \, m} = 88259.85 {\rm \, m^2 s^{-2}}$ Mostly Tenacity expressed in report as cN/tex.

== See also ==
- Specific modulus – Ratio of stiffness to mass for a material
- Space elevator – Proposed type of space transportation system
- Space tether – Load bearing cable connecting objects in space
