= Space fountain =

Extremely tall tower meant to launch spacecraft via pellets in vacuum tubes

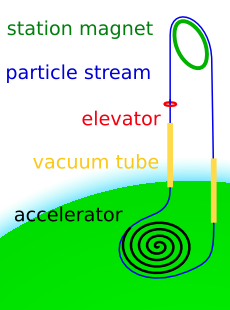
A model of a space fountain

A space fountain is a proposed form of an extremely tall tower extending into space. As known materials cannot support a static tower with this height, a space fountain has to be an active structure: A stream of pellets is accelerated upwards from a ground station. At the top it is deflected downwards. The necessary force for this deflection supports the station at the top and payloads going up the structure. A spacecraft could launch from the top without having to deal with the atmosphere. This could reduce the cost of placing payloads into orbit. Its largest downside is that the tower will re-enter the atmosphere if the accelerator fails and the stream stops. This risk could be reduced by several redundant streams.

The lower part of a pellet stream has to be in a vacuum tube to avoid excessive drag in the atmosphere. Similar to the top station, this tube can be supported by its own system of transferring momentum from a space-bound stream to a surface-bound stream. If the tube itself also accelerates the station-supporting stream, it would have to transfer additional momentum to an earth-bound stream in order to keep itself supported. The tube-supporting streams could also be designed to integrate with the station-supporting streams.

Unlike a space elevator, this concept does not need extremely strong materials anywhere, and unlike space elevators and orbital rings, it does not need a 40,000-kilometre (25,000 mi) long structure.

== See also ==
- Launch loop
- Mass driver
- Megascale engineering
- Non-rocket spacelaunch
- Orbital ring
- Space elevator
- Space gun
