= Yuri Artsutanov =

Russian engineer (1929–2019)

- Юрий Арцутанов
- Born: Yuri Nikolaevich Artsutanov; 5 October 1929; Leningrad, Russian SFSR, Soviet Union (now Saint Petersburg, Russia)
- Died: 1 January 2019 (aged 89)
- Education: Saint Petersburg State Institute of Technology
- Engineering career
- Discipline: Aerospace engineering

Yuri Nikolaevich Artsutanov (Russian: Ю́рий Никола́евич Арцута́нов; 5 October 1929 – 1 January 2019) was a Russian engineer born in Leningrad. He was one of the pioneers of the idea of a space elevator.

The February issue of the ISEC Newsletter is devoted to his life and place in history and features reminisces and photographs from his colleagues in the West, including his attendance at the 2010 ISEC Space Elevator conference.

== Biography ==
Artsutanov was a graduate of Leningrad Technological Institute. In 1960, he wrote an article "V Kosmos na Electrovoze (en. Into space with the help of an electric locomotive)", where he discussed the concept of the space elevator as an economic, safe and convenient way to access orbit and facilitate space exploration.

Artsutanov developed his idea independently from Konstantin Tsiolkovsky, who in 1895 proposed an idea of building an orbital tower. Artsutanov's concept was based on the linking of geosynchronous satellites to the ground with a cable. He suggested using the satellite as the base from which to construct the tower since a geosynchronous satellite will remain over a fixed point on the equator. By using a counterweight, a cable would be lowered from the geosynchronous orbit to the surface of Earth while the counterweight was extended from the satellite away from Earth, keeping the center of mass of the cable at the same height above the Earth. The ideas of Tsiolkovsky's compression-structure concept and Artsutanov's tension-structure concept differ in that a compression structure is well outside conceivable future capabilities, while the tension-structure is much easier to build and maintain, and is considered possible with near-future technologies.

Artsutanov later went on to propose other concepts involving space tethers, including the lunar space elevator, and using rotating tethers for space transportation.

== See also ==
- Arthur C. Clarke

== Sources ==
- Artsutanov, Yuri; V Kosmos na Electrovoze; Komsomolskaya Pravda, July 31, 1960
- English translation and recreation of original 1960 Russian article: http://images.spaceref.com/docs/spaceelevator/Artsutanov_Pravda_SE.pdf
