= Colossal carbon tube =

Tubular form of carbon

Colossal carbon tubes (CCTs) are a tubular form of carbon. In contrast to the carbon nanotubes (CNTs), colossal carbon tubes have much larger diameters ranging between 40 and 100 μm. Their walls have a corrugated structure with abundant pores, as in corrugated fiberboard, where the solid membranes have a graphite-like layered structure.

CCTs have technologically attractive properties such as ultra light-weight, extremely high strength, excellent ductility and high conductivity - which make them possibly suitable for clothing. They are excellent (10^{5} siemens per metre) electrical conductors, are 15 times stronger than the strongest carbon fiber (T1000), have 30 times the tenacity of Kevlar and are 224 times stronger than individual cotton fibers. The tubes exhibit an ultra low density comparable to that of carbon nanofoams.

CCTs have a tensile strength of 7 GPa, and a high specific strength (tensile strength per density), and a breaking length of 6,000 km. This exceeds the specific strength of the strongest carbon nanotube; this strength is sufficient to support a space elevator if retained in a fabricated macroscale structure.

CCTs conduct electricity and show some of the properties of semiconductors.
