= Robert P. Hoyt =

- Born: September 15, 1968 (age 57)
- Known for: Developing the SpiderFab
- Scientific career
- Fields: Physics and engineering

Robert P. Hoyt (born September 15, 1968) is a physicist and engineer who is known for his work developing the SpiderFab architecture for in-space additive manufacture of spacecraft as well as for his invention of the Hoytether. He also originated the MXER Tether concept, which combines momentum-exchange techniques with electrodynamic reboost propulsion to enable a bolo tether system to serve as a fully reusable in-space upper stage for boosting many payloads from LEO to GEO or lunar trajectories. He also has done work and collaborated with the late Robert L. Forward on electrodynamic space tethers for use for deorbiting space junk and interplanetary transport. He was one of the authors of a paper on using tethers for cis-lunar transportation. The Cooper Hewitt Smithsonian Design Museum included a Hoytether designed and fabricated by Hoyt in an exhibition on high-tech textiles.

In addition to his work on space tethers, Hoyt has pioneered methods for using additive manufacturing to create structures and components for spacecraft, both on the ground and in orbit, and has worked to develop self-fabricating satellites under funding from DARPA and NASA.
