= M5 fiber =

M5 fiber (polyhydroquinone-diimidazopyridine or PIPD) is a high-strength synthetic fiber first developed by the Dutch chemical firm AkzoNobel. It is produced in the United States by the Magellan Systems International, which became a division of DuPont.

== Preparation ==
M5 fiber is prepared by a condensation polymerization between tetraaminopyridine and dihydroxyterephthalic acid using diphosphorus pentoxide as a dehydrating agent. The polymer mixture is then heated and extruded to form brightly blue polymer fibers. The fibers are then washed extensively with water and base in order to remove the phosphoric acid generated by the hydration of diphosphorus pentoxide from the polymer.

Next the fiber is heated, to remove water, and exposed to controlled stress, enabling the intermolecular hydrogen bonds to be created, thus increasing the strength of the polymer by aligning the molecular structure of the fiber in a better configuration for tensile and compressive strength.

== Properties ==
M5 has a tensile strength of 4 GPa to 9.5GPa. Other aramids- (such as Kevlar and Twaron) or UHMWPE-fibres (such as Dyneema and Spectra) range from 2.2 to 3.9 GPa.

M5 has "very high levels" of fire resistance, flame retardancy, and chemical resistance, especially high for an organic fiber. It is less brittle than carbon fiber and will yield when stretched.
