= Momentum exchange tether =

Kind of space tether

A momentum exchange tether is a kind of space tether that could theoretically be used as a launch system, or to change spacecraft orbits. Momentum exchange tethers create a centripetal force on the end-masses of the system causing the object to experience the pseudo-force known as centrifugal force. While the tether system rotates, the objects on either end of the tether will experience continuous acceleration; the magnitude of the acceleration depends on the length of the tether and the rotation rate. Momentum exchange occurs when an end body is released during the rotation. The transfer of momentum to the released object will cause the rotating tether to lose energy, and thus, velocity and altitude. However, using electrodynamic tether thrusting, or ion propulsion the system can then re-boost itself with little or no expenditure of consumable reaction mass.

A non-rotating tether is a rotating tether that rotates exactly once per orbit so that it always has a vertical orientation relative to the parent body. A spacecraft arriving at the lower end of this tether, or departing from the upper end, will take momentum from the tether, while a spacecraft departing from the lower end of the tether, or arriving at the upper end, will add momentum to the tether.

In some cases, momentum exchange systems are intended to run as balanced transportation schemes where an arriving spacecraft or payload is exchanged with one leaving with the same speed and mass, and then no net change in momentum or angular momentum occurs.

== Tether systems ==
=== Tidal stabilization ===
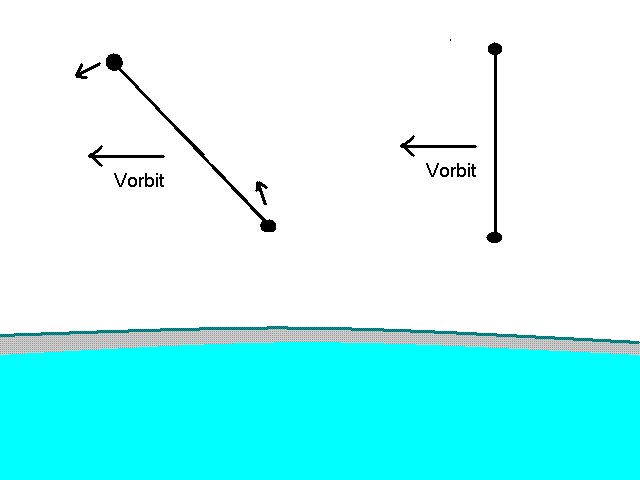
A rotating tether and a tidally stabilized tether in orbit

Gravity-gradient stabilization, also called "gravity stabilization" and "tidal stabilization", is a simple and reliable method for controlling the attitude of a satellite that requires no electronic control systems, rocket motors or propellant.

This type of attitude control tether has a small mass on one end, and a satellite on the other. Tidal forces stretch the tether between the two masses. There are two ways of explaining tidal forces. In one, the upper end mass of the system is moving faster than orbital velocity for its altitude, so centrifugal force makes it want to move further away from the planet it is orbiting. At the same time, the lower end mass of the system is moving at less than orbital speed for its altitude, so it wants to move closer to the planet. The end result is that the tether is under constant tension and wants to hang in a vertical orientation. Simple satellites have often been stabilized this way; either with tethers, or with how the mass is distributed within the satellite.

As with any freely hanging object, it can be disturbed and start to swing. Since there is no atmospheric drag in space to slow the swing, a small bottle of fluid with baffles may be mounted in the spacecraft to damp the pendulum vibrations via the viscous friction of the fluid.

=== Electrodynamic tethers ===
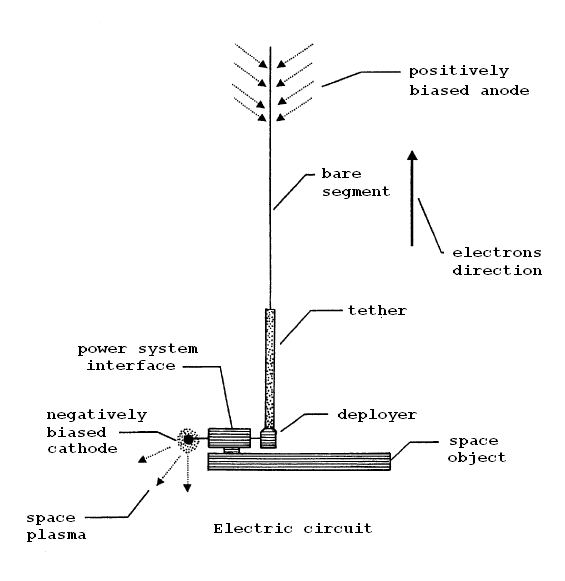
Electrons flow through the conductive structure of the tether to the power system interface, where it supplies power to an associated load, not shown. (Source: U.S. patent 6,116,544, "Electrodynamic Tether And Method of Use".)

In a strong planetary magnetic field such as around the Earth, a conducting tether can be configured as an electrodynamic tether. This can either be used as a dynamo to generate power for the satellite at the cost of slowing its orbital velocity, or it can be used to increase the orbital velocity of the satellite by putting power into the tether from the satellite's power system. Thus the tether can be used to either accelerate or to slow an orbiting spacecraft without using any rocket propellant.

When using this technique with a rotating tether, the current through the tether must alternate in phase with the rotation rate of the tether in order to produce either a consistent slowing force or a consistent accelerating force.

Whether slowing or accelerating the satellite, the electrodynamic tether pushes against the planet's magnetic field, and thus the momentum gained or lost ultimately comes from the planet.

== Sky-hooks ==
A sky-hook is a theoretical class of orbiting tether propulsion intended to lift payloads to high altitudes and speeds. Simple sky-hooks are essentially partial elevators, extending some distance below a base-station orbit and allowing orbital insertion by lifting the cargo. Most proposals spin the tether so that its angular momentum also provides energy to the cargo, speeding it up to orbital velocity or beyond while slowing the tether. Some form of propulsion is then applied to the tether to regain the angular momentum.

=== Bolo ===
A Bolo, or rotating tether, is a tether that rotates more than once per orbit and whose endpoints have a significant tip speed (~ 1–3 km/s or 2,200–6,700 mph or 3,600–10,800 km/h). The maximum speed of the endpoints is limited by the strength of the cable material, the taper, and the safety factor it is designed for.

The purpose of the Bolo is to either speed up, or slow down, a spacecraft that docks with it without using any of the spacecraft's on-board propellant and to change the spacecraft's orbital flight path. Effectively, the Bolo acts as a reusable upper stage for any spacecraft that docks with it.

The momentum imparted to the spacecraft by the Bolo is not free. In the same way that the Bolo changes the spacecraft's momentum and direction of travel, the Bolo's orbital momentum and rotational momentum is also changed, and this costs energy that must be replaced. The idea is that the replacement energy would come from a more efficient and lower cost source than a chemical rocket motor. Two possible lower cost sources for this replacement energy are an ion propulsion system, or an electrodynamic tether propulsion system that would be part of the Bolo. An essentially free source of replacement energy is momentum gathered from payloads to be accelerated in the other direction, suggesting that the need for adding energy from propulsion systems will be quite minimal with balanced, two-way, space commerce.

=== Rotovator ===
If the orbital velocity and the tether rotation rate are synchronized, in the rotovator concept the tether tip moves in a cycloid, and at the lowest point is momentarily stationary with respect to the ground, where it can "hook" a payload and swing it into orbit.)

Rotovators are rotating tethers with a rotational direction such that the lower endpoint of the tether is moving slower than the orbital velocity of the tether and the upper endpoint is moving faster. The word is a portmanteau derived from the words rotor and elevator.

If the tether is long enough and the rotation rate high enough, it is possible for the lower endpoint to completely cancel the orbital speed of the tether such that the lower endpoint is stationary with respect to the planetary surface that the tether is orbiting. As described by Moravec, this is "a satellite that rotates like a wheel". The tip of the tether moves in approximately a cycloid, in which it is momentarily stationary with respect to the ground. In this case, a payload that is "grabbed" by a capture mechanism on the rotating tether during the moment when it is stationary would be picked up and lifted into orbit; and potentially could be released at the top of the rotation, at which point it is moving with a speed significantly greater than the escape velocity and thus could be released onto an interplanetary trajectory. (As with the bolo, discussed above, the momentum and energy given to the payload must be made up, either with a high-efficiency rocket engine, or with momentum gathered from payload moving the other direction.)

On bodies with an atmosphere, such as the Earth, the tether tip must stay above the dense atmosphere. On bodies with reasonably low orbital speed (such as the Moon and possibly Mars), a rotovator in low orbit can potentially touch the ground, thereby providing cheap surface transport as well as launching materials into cislunar space. In January 2000, The Boeing Company completed a study of tether launch systems including two-stage tethers that had been commissioned by the NASA Institute for Advanced Concepts.

=== Earth launch assist bolo ===
Unfortunately an Earth-to-orbit rotovator cannot be built from currently available materials since the thickness and tether mass to handle the loads on the rotovator would be uneconomically large. A "watered down" rotovator with two-thirds the rotational speed, however, would halve the centripetal acceleration stresses.

Therefore, another trick to achieve lower stresses is that rather than picking up a cargo from the ground at zero velocity, a rotovator could pick up a moving vehicle and sling it into orbit. For example, a rotovator could pick up a Mach 12 aircraft from the upper atmosphere of the Earth and move it into orbit without using rockets, and could likewise catch such a vehicle and lower it into atmospheric flight. It is easier for a rocket to achieve the lower tip speed, so "single stage to tether" has been proposed. One such is called the Hyper-sonic Airplane Space Tether Orbital Launch (HASTOL). Either air breathing or rocket to tether could save a great deal of fuel per flight, and would permit for both a simpler vehicle and more cargo.

The company Tethers Unlimited, Inc. (founded by Robert Forward and Robert P. Hoyt) has called this approach "Tether Launch Assist". It has also been referred to as a space bolas. The company's goals have drifted to deorbit assist modules and marine tethers as in 2020 though.

Investigation of "Tether Launch Assist" concepts in 2013 have indicated the concept may become marginally economical in near future as soon as rotovators with high enough (~10 W/kg) power-to-mass ratio are developed.

=== Earth-to-Earth Skyhook ===
An Earth-to-Earth Skyhook, similar to the Earth launch assist bolo, would still require an aircraft to reach the upper atmosphere. However, instead of providing a launch assist, it would be used to transport the docked vehicle from one location on Earth to another. The aircraft would dock when the skyhook is nadir-pointing and release when the rotating-skyhook returns to the same orientation. In this scenario, the aircraft is transported to a different location while the skyhook remains in a similar energy state as before.

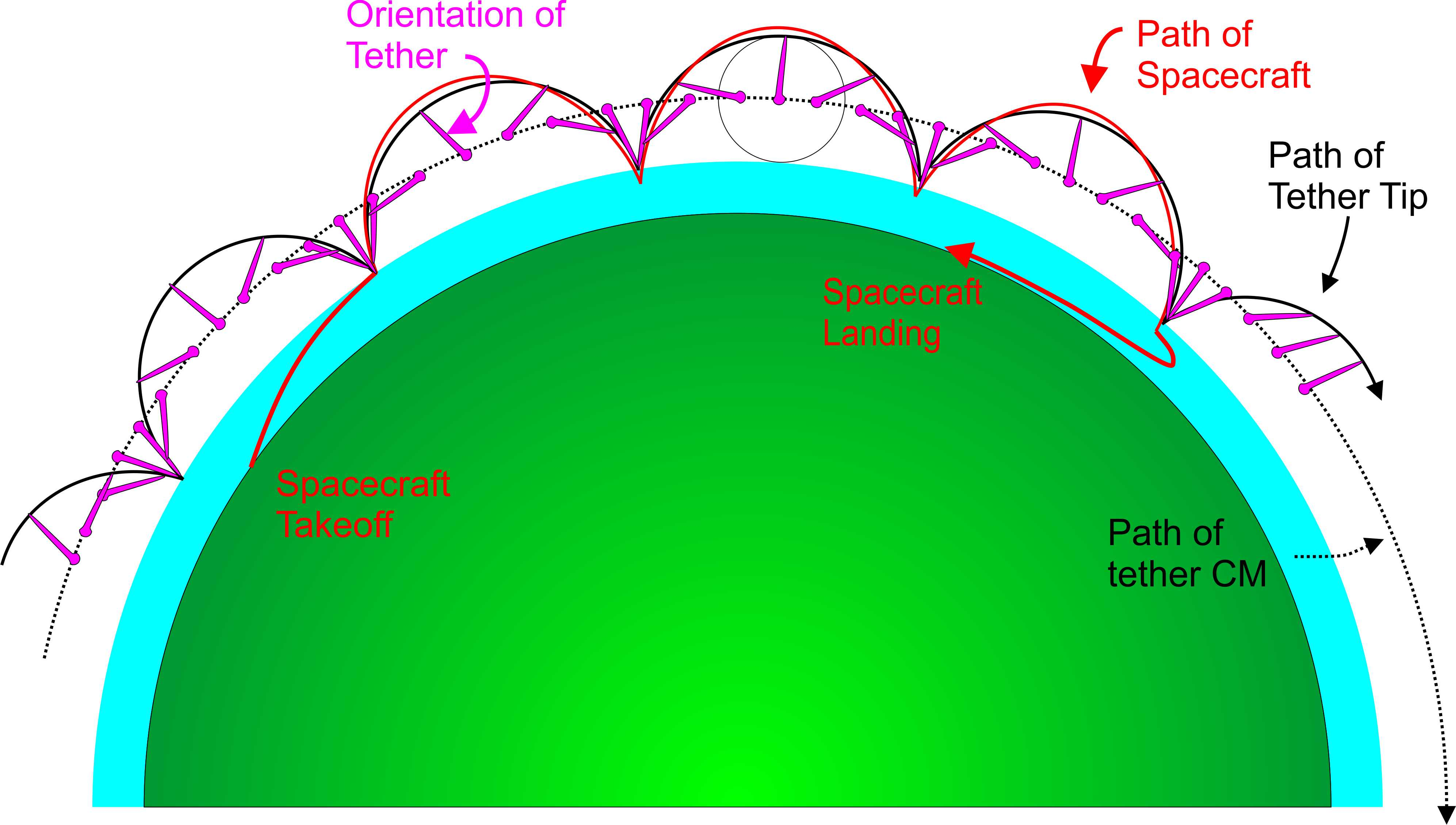
Rotating Skyhook used for Earth-to-Earth travel

=== Space elevator ===
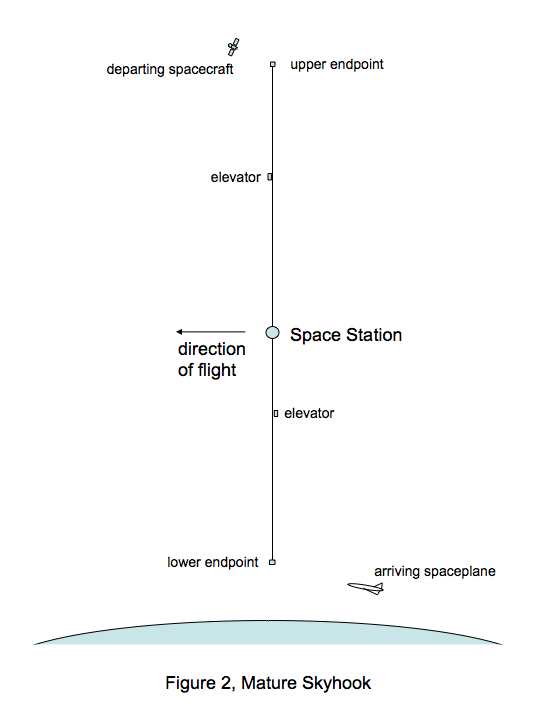
Non-rotating Sky-hook first proposed by E. Sarmont in 1990

A space elevator is a space tether that is attached to a planetary body. For example, on Earth, a space elevator would go from the equator to well above geosynchronous orbit.

A space elevator does not need to be powered as a rotovator does, because it gets any required angular momentum from the planetary body. The disadvantage is that it is much longer, and for many planets a space elevator cannot be constructed from known materials. A space elevator on Earth would require material strengths outside current technological limits (2014). Martian and lunar space elevators could be built with modern-day materials however. A space elevator on Phobos, the innermost amd larger of the two natural satellites of Mars has also been proposed.

Space elevators also have larger amounts of potential energy than a rotovator, and if heavy parts (like a "dropped wrench") should fall they would reenter at a steep angle and impact the surface at near orbital speeds. On most anticipated designs, if the cable component itself fell, it would burn up before hitting the ground.

=== Cislunar transportation system ===
Potential energy in the Earth–Moon system. Because the Moon has higher potential energy, tethers can work together to pick an object off the Moon (the tiny dimple on the right), and place it closer to the Earth in LEO, taking essentially no propellant and even generating energy while doing so.

Although it might be thought that this requires constant energy input, it can in fact be shown to be energetically favorable to lift cargo off the surface of the Moon and drop it into a lower Earth orbit, and thus it can be achieved without any significant use of propellant, since the Moon's surface is in a comparatively higher potential energy state. Also, this system could be built with a total mass of less than 28 times the mass of the payloads.

Rotovators can thus be charged by momentum exchange. Momentum charging uses the rotovator to move mass from a place that is "higher" in a gravity field to a place that is "lower". The technique to do this uses the Oberth effect, where releasing the payload when the tether is moving with higher linear speed, lower in a gravitational potential gives more specific energy, and ultimately more speed than the energy lost picking up the payload at a higher gravitational potential, even if the rotation rate is the same. For example, it is possible to use a system of two or three rotovators to implement trade between the Moon and Earth. The rotovators are charged by lunar mass (dirt, if exports are not available) dumped on or near the Earth, and can use the momentum so gained to boost Earth goods to the Moon. The momentum and energy exchange can be balanced with equal flows in either direction, or can increase over time.

Similar systems of rotovators could theoretically open up inexpensive transportation throughout the Solar System.

=== Tether cable catapult system ===
A tether cable catapult system is a system where two or more long conducting tethers are held rigidly in a straight line, attached to a heavy mass. Power is applied to the tethers and is picked up by a vehicle that has linear magnet motors on it, which it uses to push itself along the length of the cable. Near the end of the cable the vehicle releases a payload and slows and stops itself and the payload carries on at very high velocity. The calculated maximum speed for this system is extremely high, more than 30 times the speed of sound in the cable; and velocities of more than 30 km/s (67,000 mph; 110,000 km/h) seem to be possible.

== See also ==
- Yo-yo de-spin
