= Space tether =

Load bearing cable connecting objects in space

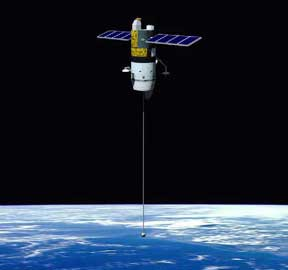
Artist's conception of satellite with a tether

Space tethers are long cables which can be used for propulsion, momentum exchange, stabilization and attitude control, or to maintain the relative positions of the components of a large, dispersed satellite/spacecraft sensor system. Depending on the mission objectives and altitude, spaceflight using this form of spacecraft propulsion is theorized to be significantly less expensive than spaceflight using rocket engines.

== Main techniques ==
Tether satellites might be used for various purposes, including research into tether propulsion, tidal stabilization and orbital plasma dynamics. Five main techniques for employing space tethers are in development:

Electrodynamic tethers

Electrodynamic tethers are primarily used for propulsion. These are conducting tethers that carry a current that can generate either thrust or drag from a planetary magnetic field, in much the same way as an electric motor does.

Momentum exchange tethers

These can be either rotating or non-rotating tethers, that capture an arriving spacecraft and then release it at a later time into a different orbit with a different velocity. Momentum exchange tethers can be used for orbital maneuvering, or as part of a planetary-surface-to-orbit / orbit-to-escape-velocity space transportation system.

Tethered formation flying

This is typically a non-conductive tether that accurately maintains a set distance between multiple space vehicles flying in formation.

Electric sail

A form of solar wind sail with electrically charged tethers that will be pushed by the momentum of solar wind ions.

Universal Orbital Support System

A concept for suspending an object from a tether orbiting in space.

Many uses for space tethers have been proposed, including deployment as space elevators, as skyhooks, and for doing propellant-free orbital transfers.

== History ==
Konstantin Tsiolkovsky (1857–1935) once proposed a tower so tall that it reached into space, so that it would be held there by the rotation of Earth. However, at the time, there was no realistic way to build it.

In 1960, another Russian, Yuri Artsutanov, wrote in greater detail about the idea of a tensile cable to be deployed from a geosynchronous satellite, downwards towards the ground, and upwards away, keeping the cable balanced. This is the space elevator idea, a type of synchronous tether that would rotate with the Earth. However, given the materials technology of the time, this too was impractical on Earth.

In the 1970s, Jerome Pearson independently conceived the idea of a space elevator, sometimes referred to as a synchronous tether, and, in particular, analyzed a lunar elevator that can go through the L1 and L2 points, and this was found to be possible with materials then existing.

In 1977, Hans Moravec and later Robert L. Forward investigated the physics of non-synchronous skyhooks, also known as rotating skyhooks, and performed detailed simulations of tapered rotating tethers that could pick objects off, and place objects onto, the Moon, Mars and other planets, with little loss, or even a net gain of energy.

In 1979, NASA examined the feasibility of the idea and gave direction to the study of tethered systems, especially tethered satellites.

In 1990, Eagle Sarmont proposed a non-rotating Orbiting Skyhook for an Earth-to-orbit / orbit-to-escape-velocity Space Transportation System in a paper titled "An Orbiting Skyhook: Affordable Access to Space". In this concept a suborbital launch vehicle would fly to the bottom end of a Skyhook, while spacecraft bound for higher orbit, or returning from higher orbit, would use the upper end.

In 2000, NASA and Boeing considered a HASTOL concept, where a rotating tether would take payloads from a hypersonic aircraft (at half of orbital velocity) to orbit.

=== Missions ===
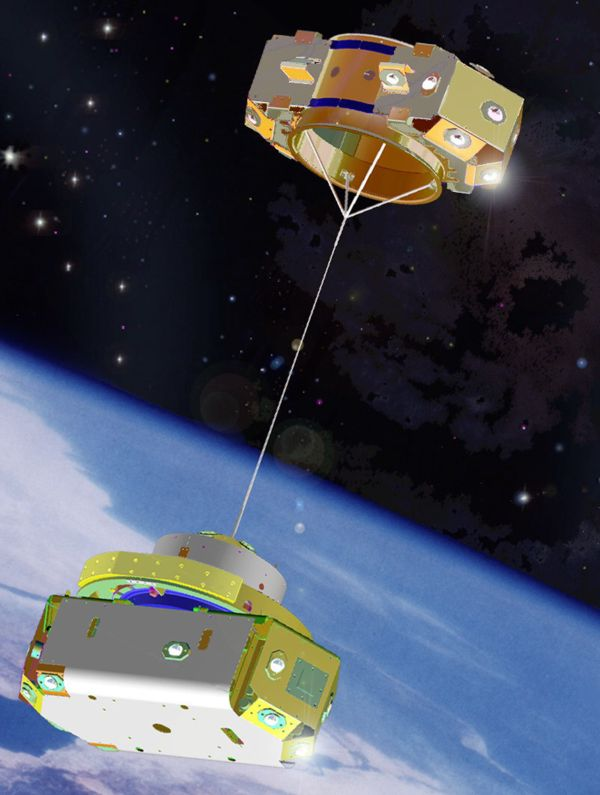
Graphic of the US Naval Research Laboratory's TiPS tether satellite. Only a small part of the 4 km tether is shown deployed.

A tether satellite is a satellite connected to another by a space tether. A number of satellites have been launched to test tether technologies, with varying degrees of success.

== Types ==
There are many different (and overlapping) types of tether.

=== Momentum exchange tethers, rotating ===
Momentum exchange tethers are one of many applications for space tethers. Momentum exchange tethers come in two types; rotating and non-rotating. A rotating tether will create a controlled force on the end-masses of the system due to centrifugal acceleration. While the tether system rotates, the objects on either end of the tether will experience continuous acceleration; the magnitude of the acceleration depends on the length of the tether and the rotation rate. Momentum exchange occurs when an end body is released during the rotation. The transfer of momentum to the released object will cause the rotating tether to lose energy, and thus lose velocity and altitude. However, using electrodynamic tether thrusting, or ion propulsion the system can then re-boost itself with little or no expenditure of consumable reaction mass.

=== Skyhook ===
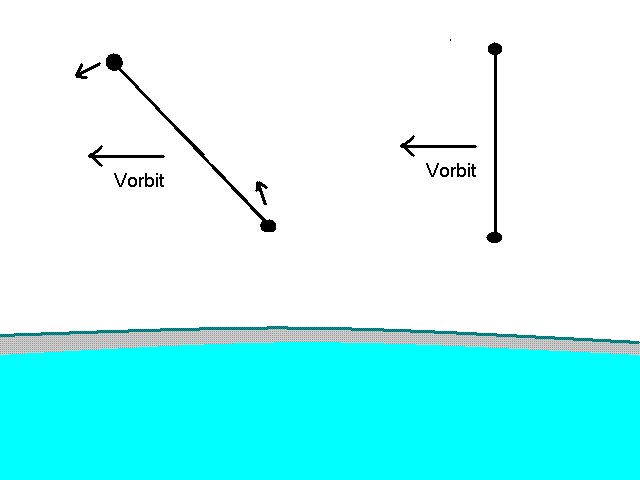
A rotating and a tidally stabilized skyhook in orbit

A skyhook is a theoretical class of orbiting tether propulsion intended to lift payloads to high altitudes and speeds. Proposals for skyhooks include designs that employ tethers spinning at hypersonic speed for catching high speed payloads or high altitude aircraft and placing them in orbit.

=== Electrodynamics ===
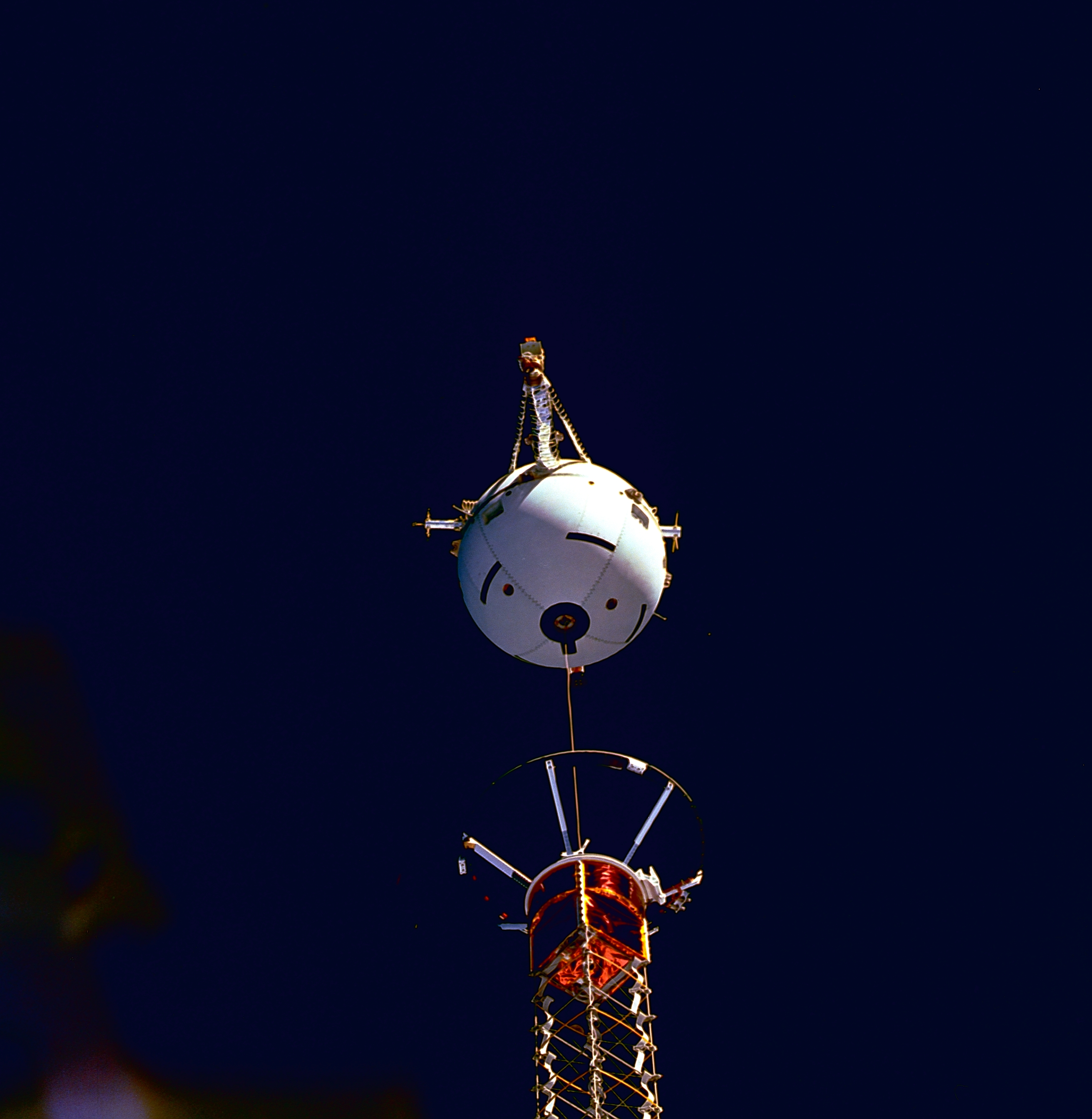
Medium close-up view, captured with a 70 mm camera, shows Tethered Satellite System deployment.

Electrodynamic tethers are long conducting wires, such as one deployed from a tether satellite, which can operate on electromagnetic principles as generators, by converting their kinetic energy to electrical energy, or as motors, converting electrical energy to kinetic energy. Electric potential is generated across a conductive tether by its motion through the Earth's magnetic field. The choice of the metal conductor to be used in an electrodynamic tether is determined by a variety of factors. Primary factors usually include high electrical conductivity and low density. Secondary factors, depending on the application, include cost, strength, and melting point.

An electrodynamic tether was profiled in the documentary film Orphans of Apollo as technology that was to be used to keep the Russian space station Mir in orbit.

=== Formation flying ===
This is the use of a (typically) non-conductive tether to connect multiple spacecraft. Tethered Experiment for Mars inter-Planetary Operations (TEMPO³) is a proposed 2011 experiment to study the technique.

=== Universal Orbital Support System ===
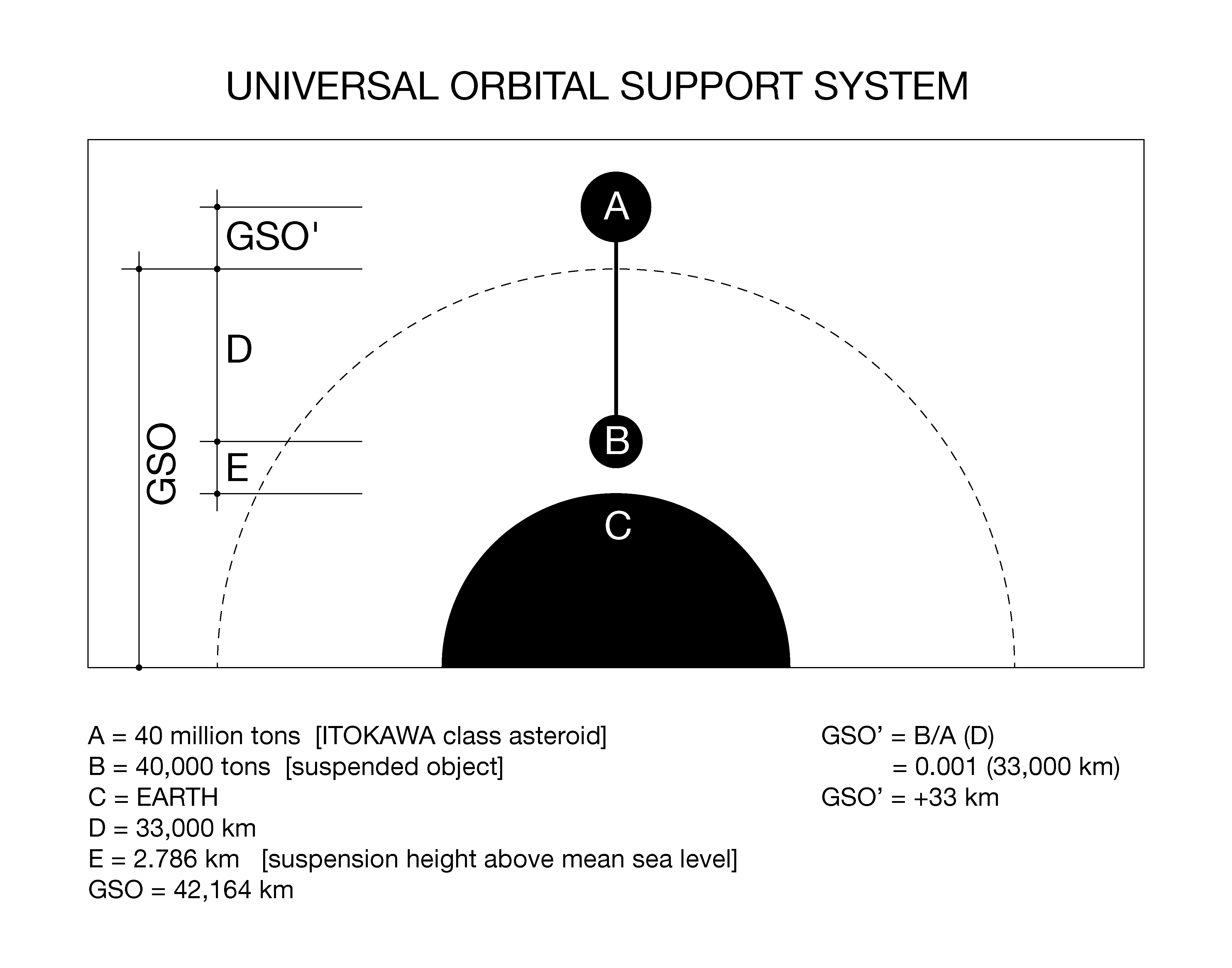
Example of a possible layout using the Universal Orbital Support System

A theoretical type of non-rotating tethered satellite system, it is a concept for providing space-based support to things suspended above an astronomical object. The orbital system is a coupled mass system wherein the upper supporting mass (A) is placed in an orbit around a given celestial body such that it can support a suspended mass (B) at a specific height above the surface of the celestial body, but lower than (A).

== Technical difficulties ==
=== Gravitational gradient stabilization ===
Description of the forces contributing towards maintaining a gravity gradient alignment in a tether system

Instead of rotating end for end, tethers can also be kept straight by the slight difference in the strength of gravity over their length.

A non-rotating tether system has a stable orientation that is aligned along the local vertical (of the earth or other body). This can be understood by inspection of the figure on the right where two spacecraft at two different altitudes have been connected by a tether. Normally, each spacecraft would have a balance of gravitational (e.g. F_{g1}) and centrifugal (e.g. F_{c1}) forces, but when tied together by a tether, these values begin to change with respect to one another. This phenomenon occurs because, without the tether, the higher-altitude mass would travel slower than the lower mass. The system must move at a single speed, so the tether must therefore slow down the lower mass and speed up the upper one. The centrifugal force of the tethered upper body is increased, while that of the lower-altitude body is reduced. This results in the centrifugal force of the upper body and the gravitational force of the lower body being dominant. This difference in forces naturally aligns the system along the local vertical, as seen in the figure.

=== Atomic oxygen ===
Objects in low Earth orbit are subjected to noticeable erosion from atomic oxygen due to the high orbital speed with which the molecules strike as well as their high reactivity. This could quickly erode a tether.

=== Micrometeorites and space junk ===
Simple single-strand tethers are susceptible to micrometeoroids and space junk. Several systems have since been proposed and tested to improve debris resistance:

- The US Naval Research Laboratory has successfully flown a long term 6-kilometer (3.7 mi) long, 2–3-millimeter (0.079–0.118 in) diameter tether with an outer layer of Spectra 1000 braid and a core of acrylic yarn. This satellite, the Tether Physics and Survivability Experiment (TiPS), was launched in June 1996 and remained in operation over 10 years, finally breaking in July 2006.
- Robert P. Hoyt patented an engineered circular net, such that a cut strand's strains would be redistributed automatically around the severed strand. This is called a Hoytether. Hoytethers have theoretical lifetimes of decades.
- Researchers with JAXA have also proposed net-based tethers for their future missions.

Large pieces of junk would still cut most tethers, including the improved versions listed here, but these are currently tracked on radar and have predictable orbits. Although thrusters could be used to change the orbit of the system, a tether could also be temporally wiggled in the right place, using less energy, to dodge known pieces of junk.

=== Radiation ===
Radiation, including UV radiation tend to degrade tether materials, and reduce lifespan. Tethers that repeatedly traverse the Van Allen belts can have markedly lower life than those that stay in low earth orbit or are kept outside Earth's magnetosphere.

== Construction ==
=== Properties of useful materials ===
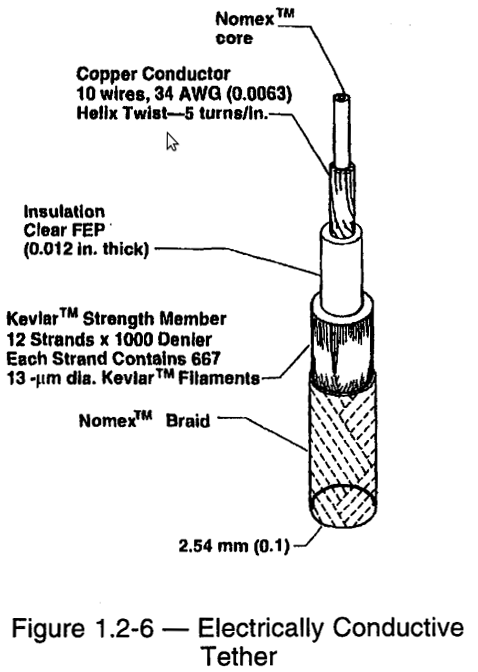
TSS-1R tether composition (NASA)

Tether properties and materials are dependent on the application. However, there are some common properties. To achieve maximum performance and low cost, tethers would need to be made of materials with the combination of high strength or electrical conductivity and low density. All space tethers are susceptible to space debris or micrometeoroids. Therefore, system designers will need to decide whether or not a protective coating is needed, including relative to UV and atomic oxygen.

For applications that exert high tensile forces on the tether, the materials need to be strong and light. Some current tether designs use crystalline plastics such as ultra-high-molecular-weight polyethylene, aramid or carbon fiber. A possible future material would be carbon nanotubes, which have an estimated tensile strength between 140 and 177 GPa (20.3 and 25.7 million psi; 1.38 and 1.75 million atm), and a proven tensile strength in the range 50–60 GPa (7.3–8.7 million psi; 490,000–590,000 atm) for some individual nanotubes. (A number of other materials obtain 10 to 20 GPa (1.5 to 2.9 million psi; 99,000 to 197,000 atm) in some samples on the nano scale, but translating such strengths to the macro scale has been challenging so far, with, as of 2011, CNT-based ropes being an order of magnitude less strong, not yet stronger than more conventional carbon fiber on that scale).

For some applications, the tensile force on the tether is projected to be less than 65 newtons (15 lbf). Material selection in this case depends on the purpose of the mission and design constraints. Electrodynamic tethers, such as the one used on TSS-1R, may use thin copper wires for high conductivity (see EDT).

There are design equations for certain applications that may be used to aid designers in identifying typical quantities that drive material selection.

Space elevator equations typically use a "characteristic length", L_{c}, which is also known as its "self-support length" and is the length of untapered cable it can support in a constant 1 g gravity field.

$$L_c = \frac{\sigma}{\rho g}$$,

where σ is the stress limit (in pressure units) and ρ is the density of the material.

Hypersonic skyhook equations use the material's "specific velocity" which is equal to the maximum tangential velocity a spinning hoop can attain without breaking:

$$V = \sqrt{\frac{\sigma}{\rho}}$$

For rotating tethers (rotovators) the value used is the material's 'characteristic velocity' which is the maximum tip velocity a rotating untapered cable can attain without breaking,

$$V_c = \sqrt{\frac{2\sigma}{\rho}}$$

The characteristic velocity equals the specific velocity multiplied by the square root of two.

These values are used in equations similar to the rocket equation and are analogous to specific impulse or exhaust velocity. The higher these values are, the more efficient and lighter the tether can be in relation to the payloads that they can carry. Eventually however, the mass of the tether propulsion system will be limited at the low end by other factors such as momentum storage.

=== Practical materials ===
Proposed materials include Kevlar, ultra-high-molecular-weight polyethylene, carbon nanotubes and M5 fiber. M5 is a synthetic fiber that is lighter than Kevlar or Spectra. According to Pearson, Levin, Oldson, and Wykes in their article "The Lunar Space Elevator", an M5 ribbon 30 mm (1.2 in) wide and 0.023 mm (0.91 mils) thick, would be able to support 2,000 kg (4,400 lb) on the lunar surface. It would also be able to hold 100 cargo vehicles, each with a mass of 580 kg (1,280 lb), evenly spaced along the length of the elevator. Other materials that could be used are T1000G carbon fiber, Spectra 2000, or Zylon.

Potential tether / elevator materials
Material	Density ρ (kg/m^{3})	Stress limit σ (GPa)	Characteristic length L_{c} = σ/ρg (km)	Specific velocity V_{s} = √σ/ρ (km/s)	Char. velocity V_{c} = √2σ/ρ (km/s)
Single-wall carbon nanotubes (individual molecules measured)	2,266	50	2,200	4.7	6.6
Aramid, polybenzoxazole (PBO) fiber ("Zylon")	1,340	5.9	450	2.1	3.0
Toray carbon fiber (T1000G)	1,810	6.4	360	1.9	2.7
M5 fiber (planned values)	1,700	9.5	570	2.4	3.3
M5 fiber (existing)	1,700	5.7	340	1.8	2.6
Honeywell extended chain polyethylene fiber (Spectra 2000)	970	3.0	316	1.8	2.5
DuPont Aramid fiber (Kevlar 49)	1,440	3.6	255	1.6	2.2
Silicon carbide	3,000	5.9	199	1.4	2.0

=== Shape ===
==== Tapering ====
For gravity stabilized tethers, to exceed the self-support length the tether material can be tapered so that the cross-sectional area varies with the total load at each point along the length of the cable. In practice this means that the central tether structure needs to be thicker than the tips. Correct tapering ensures that the tensile stress at every point in the cable is exactly the same. For very demanding applications, such as an Earth space elevator, the tapering can reduce the excessive ratios of cable weight to payload weight. In lieu of tapering a modular staged tether system maybe used to achieve the same goal. Multiple tethers would be used between stages. The number of tethers would determine the strength of any given cross-section.

==== Thickness ====
For rotating tethers not significantly affected by gravity, the thickness also varies, and it can be shown that the area, A, is given as a function of r (the distance from the centre) as follows:

$$A(r) = \frac {M v^2} {T R} \mathrm{e} ^ { \frac {\delta} {T} \frac {v^2} {2} \left( 1-\frac {r^2} {R^2} \right) }$$

where R is the radius of tether, v is the velocity with respect to the centre, M is the tip mass, $\delta$ is the material density, and T is the design tensile strength.

==== Mass ratio ====
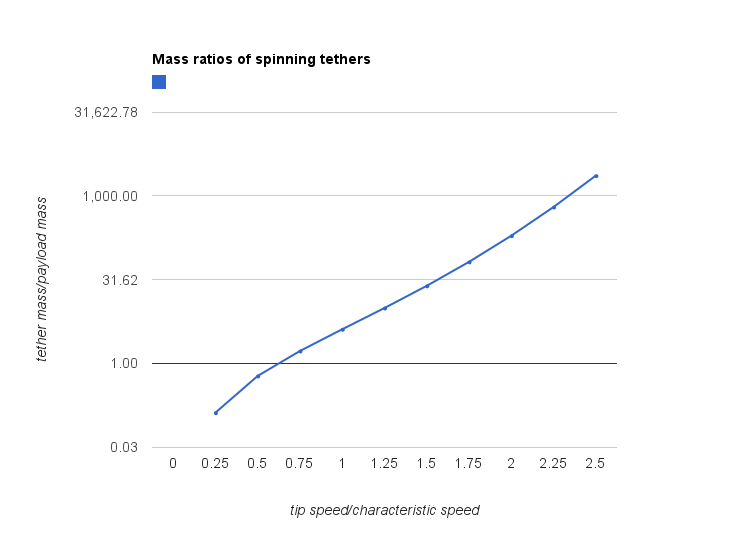
Graph of tether mass to payload ratio versus the tip speed in multiples of the characteristic speed of the material

Integrating the area to give the volume and multiplying by the density and dividing by the payload mass gives a payload mass / tether mass ratio of:

$$\frac M m = \sqrt { \pi \frac { \delta } T \frac {V^2} {2} } \mathrm{e}^{ \left( \frac { \delta } T \frac {V^2} {2} \right) } \mathrm{erf} \left( \sqrt { \frac { \delta } T \frac { V^2 } {2} } \right)$$

where erf is the normal probability error function.

Let $V_r = V / V_c \,$,

$$V_c = \sqrt { \frac {2 T} \delta }$$

then:

$$\frac M m = \sqrt { \pi } V_r \mathrm{e}^{ {V_r}^2 } \mathrm{erf} ( {V_r} )$$

This equation can be compared with the rocket equation, which is proportional to a simple exponent on a velocity, rather than a velocity squared. This difference effectively limits the delta-v that can be obtained from a single tether.

=== Redundancy ===
In addition the cable shape must be constructed to withstand micrometeorites and space junk. This can be achieved with the use of redundant cables, such as the Hoytether; redundancy can ensure that it is very unlikely that multiple redundant cables would be damaged near the same point on the cable, and hence a very large amount of total damage can occur over different parts of the cable before failure occurs.

=== Material strength ===
Beanstalks and rotovators are currently limited by the strengths of available materials. Although ultra-high strength plastic fibers (Kevlar and Spectra) permit rotovators to pluck masses from the surface of the Moon and Mars, a rotovator from these materials cannot lift from the surface of the Earth. In theory, high flying, supersonic (or hypersonic) aircraft could deliver a payload to a rotovator that dipped into Earth's upper atmosphere briefly at predictable locations throughout the tropic (and temperate) zone of Earth. As of May 2013, all mechanical tethers (orbital and elevators) are on hold until stronger materials are available.

=== Cargo capture ===
Cargo capture for rotovators is nontrivial, and failure to capture can cause problems. Several systems have been proposed, such as shooting nets at the cargo, but all add weight, complexity, and another failure mode. At least one lab scale demonstration of a working grapple system has been achieved, however.

=== Life expectancy ===
Currently, the strongest materials in tension are plastics that require a coating for protection from UV radiation and (depending on the orbit) erosion by atomic oxygen. Disposal of waste heat is difficult in a vacuum, so overheating may cause tether failures or damage.

== Control and modelling ==
=== Pendular motion instability ===
Electrodynamic tethers deployed along the local vertical ('hanging tethers') may suffer from dynamical instability. Pendular motion causes the tether vibration amplitude to build up under the action of electromagnetic interaction. As the mission time increases, this behavior can compromise the performance of the system. Over a few weeks, electrodynamic tethers in Earth orbit might build up vibrations in many modes, as their orbit interacts with irregularities in magnetic and gravitational fields.

One plan to control the vibrations is to actively vary the tether current to counteract the growth of the vibrations. Electrodynamic tethers can be stabilized by reducing their current when it would feed the oscillations, and increasing it when it opposes oscillations. Simulations have demonstrated that this can control tether vibration. This approach requires sensors to measure tether vibrations, which can either be an inertial navigation system on one end of the tether, or satellite navigation systems mounted on the tether, transmitting their positions to a receiver on the end.

Another proposed method is to use spinning electrodynamic tethers instead of hanging tethers. The gyroscopic effect provides passive stabilisation, avoiding the instability.

=== Surges ===
As mentioned earlier, conductive tethers have failed from unexpected current surges. Unexpected electrostatic discharges have cut tethers (e.g. see Tethered Satellite System Reflight (TSS‑1R) on STS‑75), damaged electronics, and welded tether handling machinery. It may be that the Earth's magnetic field is not as homogeneous as some engineers have believed.

=== Vibrations ===
Computer models frequently show tethers can snap due to vibration.

Mechanical tether-handling equipment is often surprisingly heavy, with complex controls to damp vibrations. The one ton climber proposed by Brad Edwards for his Space Elevator may detect and suppress most vibrations by changing speed and direction. The climber can also repair or augment a tether by spinning more strands.

The vibration modes that may be a problem include skipping rope, transverse, longitudinal, and pendulum.

Tethers are nearly always tapered, and this can greatly amplify the movement at the thinnest tip in whip-like ways.

=== Other issues ===
A tether is not a spherical object, and has significant extent. This means that as an extended object, it is not directly modelable as a point source, and this means that the center of mass and center of gravity are not usually colocated. Thus the inverse square law does not apply except at large distances, to the overall behaviour of a tether. Hence the orbits are not completely Keplerian, and in some cases they are actually chaotic.

With bolus designs, rotation of the cable interacting with the non-linear gravity fields found in elliptical orbits can cause exchange of orbital angular momentum and rotation angular momentum. This can make prediction and modelling extremely complex.

== See also ==
- STARS-II
- Spacecraft propulsion
- Non-rocket spacelaunch
- Orbital ring – theoretical artificial ring placed in Earth orbit
