= Space elevators in fiction =

A space elevator is a hypothetical planet-to-space transportation system. They are also referred to as a space bridge, star ladder, and orbital lift. Often depicted in science fiction, additional references summarized herein include orbital elevator, beanstalk, and skyhook. This is a list of occurrences of space elevators in fiction across various mediums.

== Novels and short stories ==
| Title | Type | First Published | Author | Context |
|---|---|---|---|---|
| 2061: Odyssey Three | novel | 1987 | Arthur C. Clarke | The possibility of a space elevator is realised after a groundbreaking discovery that Jupiter's core (now in fragments around the orbit of Lucifer, the small sun formed by the implosion of Jupiter) had been a solid diamond; as the hardest substance in nature, suddenly available in vast quantities, it facilitates the construction of a solid elevator rather than the more common tether structure previously envisaged |
| 2312 | novel | 2012 | Kim Stanley Robinson | Space elevators connect Earth's surface to orbit. |
| 3001: The Final Odyssey | novel | 1997 | Arthur C. Clarke | In this novel, a ring habitat now exists around the Earth that is connected to the surface via four inhabitable towers–assumed successors to space elevators |
| Across the Sea of Suns | novel | 1984 | Gregory Benford | Discussion of space elevators and moving people and machines up and down from orbit reducing need for rockets |
| Assassin Gambit | novel | 1988 | William R. Forstchen | Space elevator, including book cover art |
| Blake's 7: Archangel | novel | 2012 | Scott Harrison | While in a hologram simulation of an alien city called Teshak City, a character spots the bottom of a space lift connected to a promontory of rock further down the river. |
| Charlie and the Great Glass Elevator | novel | 1972 | Roald Dahl | While technically an elevator in space, this may not qualify as a "space elevator." |
| Chasm City | novel | 2001 | Alastair Reynolds | A space elevator spectacularly sabotaged by nuclear weaponry as protagonist is on-board |
| Children of Time | novel | 2015 | Adrian Tchaikovsky | A species of jumping spider has been introduced on a distant terraformed planet, and is inadvertently infected with a nanovirus that hyper-accelerates its evolution and societal development. The advanced spiders refine their silk spinning processes to enable various technologies, including a web of interconnected space elevators and orbiting stations as their primary means to become a spacefaring civilization. |
| City of Heaven | novel | 2008 | Tom Terry | Depicts a terrorist attack aboard a space elevator |
| Creation Node | novel | 2023 | Stephen Baxter | Helium-3 is mined in Saturn's atmosphere via a space elevator attached to a habitat in orbit around the planet. |
| Deepsix | novel | 2001 | Jack McDevitt | The remains of a space elevato (skyhook) are found on a doomed planet |
| The Descent of Anansi | novel | 1982 | Steven Barnes and Larry Niven | Physics of tidal forces and orbital tether concepts are addressed in the plot |
| The Dire Earth Cycle trilogy | novel | 2013 | Jason M. Hough | Story is set in the year 2283 in Darwin Australia where aliens have gifted Earth a space elevator |
| Drakon | novel | 1996 | S.M. Stirling | Referred to as the beanstalk |
| The End of the Empire | novel | 1983 | Alexis A. Gilliland | Orbital elevators are used to control population between orbital habitats and the planet Malusia |
| Feersum Endjinn | novel | 1994 | Iain M. Banks | Four narratives built around a defunct megastructure that was a space elevator |
| First Ascent | novel | 2025 | Douglas Phillips | A space elevator appears overnight off the coast of Ecuador. Its graphene laminate tether, six stations, and maglev V-pod climber become the primary settings for the story. |
| Foreigner | novel | 1994 | Robert J. Sawyer | Space elevator built by aliens |
| Free Fall | novel | 2011 | William H. Keith | Story features a towering exo-atmospheric elevator serving as Earth's hub of interplanetary trade |
| Friday | novel | 1982 | Robert A. Heinlein | Story features two space elevators located near the Equator (the "Quito Sky Hook" and "Nairobi Beanstalk"). |
| The Fountains of Paradise | novel | 1979 | Arthur C. Clarke | This novel is primarily about the construction of a space elevator on a mountain top on Earth in a fictionalised version of Sri Lanka. |
| The Gordon Mamon Casebook, five SF murder-mystery stories (Murder On The Zenith Express, Single Handed, The Fall Guy, The Hunt For Red Leicester, and A Night To Remember) | novel | 2012 | Simon Petrie | Set on a string of hotel modules ascending and descending a space elevator that connects Earth with a mega-hotel in geosynchronous orbit. A subsequent novella, Elevator Pitch, shares this setting. |
| Halo: Ghosts of Onyx | novel | 2006 | Eric S. Nylund | Features the UNSC Centennial Orbital Elevator in Havana, Cuba. |
| Halo: Contact Harvest | novel | 2007 | Joseph Staten | It depicts the Harvest space elevator, which is used to evacuate the population and militia to orbit during the first battle of Harvest |
| The Highest Frontier | novel | 2011 | Joan Slonczewski | A college student rides a space elevator constructed of self-healing cables of anthrax bacilli. The engineered bacteria can regrow the cables when severed by space debris. |
| Hothouse | novel | 1962 | Brian Aldiss | The space elevator in this novel is in actuality a giant banyan tree, which has grown to enormous size over many millennia. |
| Jack and the Skyhook | novel | 2003 | Damien Broderick | Children's book, science fiction take on Jack and the Beanstalk |
| Johnny Mackintosh and the Spirit of London | novel | 2008 | Keith Mansfield | Title character Johnny Mackintosh and sister Clara leave Earth for the first time in a secret space elevator. |
| Jumping Off the Planet | novel | 1998 | David Gerrold | family vacation up the space elevator to the Moon |
| Kris Longknife Indomitable | novel | 2019 | Mike Shepherd | Space elevators are ubiquitous across the known galaxy. |
| The Last Theorem | novel | 2008 | Arthur C. Clarke, Frederik Pohl | Plot includes a space elevator built in Sri Lanka |
| Limit | novel | 2009 | Frank Schätzing | Used for transporting nuclear fuel between Moon and Earth. |
| The Long Mars | novel | 2014 | Stephen Baxter, Terry Pratchett | In the parallel martian worlds, the existence of the elevator is proven as to be a logical step for a long-gone civilization. |
| The Mars Trilogy (Red Mars, Green Mars, and Blue Mars) | novel | 1992 | Kim Stanley Robinson | Depicts space elevators on Earth and on Mars, the cables of which are made of carbon nanotubes manufactured on asteroids and lowered into each planet's atmosphere, using the asteroid as a counterweight. Red Mars depicts what happens when a cable is cut at the asteroid anchor point. |
| Marsbound | novel | 2008 | Joe Haldeman | Story focuses on ride on a space elevator that has been built off the Galapagos Islands in the Pacific Ocean in the late 21st century |
| Mercury | novel | 2005 | Ben Bova | About a space elevator sabotage that gets an innocent man exiled from Earth |
| Metaplanetary and Superluminal | novel | 2001 | Tony Daniel | The inner system of the Met are worlds connected by a vast living network of cables |
| The Mirrored Heavens | novel | 2008 | David J. Williams | Phoenix Space Elevator, built by the United States and the Eurasian Coalition, designed to provide access to the frontier beyond Earth |
| The Night Sessions | novel | 2008 | Ken MacLeod | Earth's two space elevators are destroyed |
| The Night's Dawn Trilogy | novel | 1996 | Peter F. Hamilton | Space elevators are ubiquitous part of the story infrastructure |
| Old Man's War | novel | 2005 | John Scalzi | Explicitly established not to be in a physically viable orbit, indicating the government which maintains it is keeping technological secrets from Earth. |
| Pillar to the Sky | novel | 2014 | William R. Forstchen | Plot focuses on building the first space elevator on Earth |
| Places in the Darkness | novel | 2017 | Christopher Brookmyre | Action in the novel occurs at Ciudad de Cielo which is a double-wheeled station reached by a climb up a space elevator to geostationary orbit and then a brief shuttle ride to the station in high orbit. |
| Project Hail Mary | novel | 2021 | Andy Weir | The Eridian race has built a space elevator to reach orbit, since the gravity and atmosphere on their homeworld of Erid (40 Eridani A b) make traditional chemical rocket launches nearly impossible. This elevator is also used to dock with their exploratory ship Blip-A and the Earth ship Hail Mary. |
| Rainbow Mars | novel | 1999 | Larry Niven | With 'beanstalks' on Mars and Earth |
| The Rope Is the World included in the collection Three Moments of an Explosion: Stories | short story | 2009 | China Miéville | Depicts the bleaker aspects of space elevators, as the novelty wears off and they become derelict. |
| Running the Line - Stories of the Space Elevator | novel | 2006 | Editors Brad Edwards and David Raitt | The book is a result of the 2nd Clarke-Bradbury International Science Fiction Competition organized by David Raitt of the European Space Agency's Technology Transfer and Promotion Office with the theme of Space Elevators. The book contains 35 stories (including the winner and runner up plus three images (including winner and runner up). |
| The Science of Discworld | novel | 1999 | Terry Pratchett, Jack Cohen, Ian Stewart | Roundworld humanity escapes to the stars via an elevator |
| Singularity's Ring | novel | 2008 | Paul Melko | Space elevator used by protagonists to gain access to the planetary surface |
| Songs of Distant Earth | novel | 1986 | Arthur C. Clarke | The name 'space elevator' is not used in this book and the device used is not suitable for transporting humans. Instead, a kind of very strong cable is used to pull massive blocks of ice up to a spaceship in orbit around a fictitious planet from its surface |
| Starclimber | novel | 2008 | Kenneth Oppel | The main characters go to space using a space elevator. |
| Strata | novel | 1981 | Terry Pratchett | Space elevators are part of the infrastructure within the plot |
| Sundiver | novel | 1980 | David Brin | Plot starts with crash of an orbital elevator |
| Sunstorm | novel | 2005 | Arthur C. Clarke, Stephen Baxter | Story concludes with the construction of a space elevator in Australia |
| Tour of the Universe | novel | 1980 | Robert Holdstock, Malcolm Edwards | Includes a space elevator rising from Ecuador to an orbiting space station |
| The Web Between the Worlds | novel | 1980 | Charles Sheffield | Bridge-building engineer is recruited to build a space elevator using custom Spider machine to spin the cable |
| Zavtra Nastupit Vechnost (Tomorrow The Eternity Will Come) | novel | 2024 | Alexander Gromov | Orbital stations and a space elevator |
| Vertikala (The Vertical) | novel | 2006 | Predrag Raos | Story focuses on protagonist's pilgrimage through the enormous, hundreds of kilometers long and tens of kilometers high "space bridge" |
| The Three Body Problem | novel | 2008 | Cixin Liu | Use of carbon nanotubes to build a space elevator |

== Anime, comics, and manga ==
| Title | Type | First published | Author | Context |
|---|---|---|---|---|
| Battle Angel Alita | manga | 1990 | Yukito Kishiro | The floating city of Tiphares/Zalem is actually the bottom end of one of two space elevators, each located on the opposite ends of the world and joined by an orbital ring. Its sister city Ketheres/Jeru is at the opposite end of the elevator. |
| Biomega | manga | 2004 | Tsutomu Nihei | Features a space elevator referred to as the "Intercontinental Mooring Cable." |
| Bubblegum Crisis Tokyo 2040 | anime | 1998 | Chiaki J. Konaka, Sadayuki Murai | Contains a rotating skyhook throughout the series. |
| Cannon God Exaxxion | manga | 1997 | Kenichi Sonoda | Features a space elevator built on Earth using alien technology. |
| A Certain Magical Index: The Movie – The Miracle of Endymion | anime | 2013 | Kazuma Kamachi | Features a space elevator called Endymion, based on the Greek mythology of the same name, where the main setting takes place. The film is adapted into a manga series, which also features the titular space elevator. |
| Cyber City Oedo 808 episode 3 | | 1990 | Akinori Endo | Features a space elevator that criminal turned cop Benten rides to investigate a murder. |
| Hammerlocke | comics | 1992 | Tom Joyner, Kez Wilson | Features a space elevator under construction in mid-21st century Africa. |
| Kiddy Grade | anime | 2002 | Tomohiko Aoki | In which a space elevator combined with an Orbital ring structure is used on most populated planets. |
| Kurau: Phantom Memory | anime | 2004 | Hiroshi Tominaga | Space elevators are used as spaceports for easier traveling between the Earth and a full colonized Moon. |
| Laddertop | manga | 2011 | Orson Scott Card | Features four space elevators called Ladders, which terminate at a massive space station. |
| Mobile Suit Gundam 00 | anime | 2007 | Yōsuke Kuroda | All the superpowers have a space elevator (Permanent Orbital Station) of their own, linked to a Solar Power Satellite array used to harness solar energy for their use. Each elevator has two orbital stations: the lower orbital station functions as a spaceport and tourist attraction while the high orbital station houses the elevator's control facilities and provides physical access to the solar array. The partial destruction of the Africa elevator in the second season reveals that the elevators have ablative armor plates for protection against debris; purging these plates require the technical crew to jettison the counterweight at the orbital end in order to avoid the now-unbalanced elevator's complete destruction. They play a critical plot role in power balance and maintaining spheres of influence by denying electricity to rogue states. |
| Nemesis the Warlock Book 4 The Gothic Empire | comics | 1980 | Pat Mills | Includes a gigantic version of the Eiffel Tower that acted as an elevator to the moon. |
| RIXA | comic series (Indonesian) | 2016 | Haryadhi | Features a rescue mission on Konstantin Space Elevator (tribute to astronautic theorist Konstantin Tsiolkovsky) after a terrorist remote hijack that caused the climber car to malfunction and trapping three Japanese astronauts on 750 km altitude. The space elevator also host an "Interdimensional Portal" on the space station tethered on top. |
| Starship Operators ep. 5 Great Escape | anime | 2001 | Ryo Mizuno | Briefly depicts an orbital elevator ride on a fictitious planet. |
| The Super Dimension Century Orguss | anime | 1983 | Ken'ichi Matsuzaki | Anime television series features a conflict over a space elevator. |
| Tekkaman Blade | anime | 1992 | Mayori Sekijima, Satoru Akahori | Depicts six "orbital elevators" located throughout Earth and locked in space by an orbital ring structure. Every episode deals with the space elevators. |
| Transformers | comics | 2019 | | Features a space elevator called the Tether, connecting the planet Cybertron to a geoengineered planetoid called the Winged Moon. |
| Z.O.E. Dolores, I | anime | 2001 | Shin Yoshida | Contains an orbital elevator early in the series, and then is the focus of the end, where someone is trying to destroy the counterweights to make the elevator collapse. Intriguing use of emergency counterweights depicted. |
| Gundam Reconguista in G or G-Reco | anime | 2014 | Yoshiyuki Tomino | The plots centers on an advanced space elevator. |

== Games ==
| Title | Type | First published | Author | Context |
|---|---|---|---|---|
| 2300 AD | role-playing game | 1986 | Game Designers' Workshop | Space elevators are used to get to and from orbit. "Beanstalk" space elevator is the greatest achievement in material science. |
| Apex Legends | Multiplayer Battle Royale game | 2019 | Respawn Entertainment | Features a Space elevator named the Sky-Hook on its map 'Worlds Edge'. |
| Ace Combat 7: Skies Unknown and Ace Combat 8: Wings of Theve | combat flight sim | 2019 | Bandai Namco Studios | Features the International Space Elevator (ISEV). Also known as Lighthouse. |
| Android | board game | 2008 | Fantasy Flight Games | Detective board game includes a space elevator ("beanstalk"). |
| ANNO 2205 | citybuild sim game | 2015 | Ubisoft | The player is tasked with leading their corporation to construct a space elevator in order to facilitate lunar colonization and mining of Helium-3 |
| Armored Core 2, Armored Core 2: Another Age | third-person shooter | 2000 | FromSoftware | Features space elevators named "Rapture" above both Earth and Mars. |
| Before The Green Moon | farming sim game | 2023 | Turnfollow | Game character moves through a town in the shadow of a space elevator bringing people to the moon |
| Buck Rogers - Battle for the 25th Century | board game | 1988 | TSR, Inc. | Features a space elevator connecting the Mars territory of Pavonis to the Far Mars Orbit and the moon, Deimos. |
| Call of Duty: Advanced Warfare | first person shooter | 2014 | Activision | Features a space elevator in the multiplayer map Ascend. |
| Cities: Skylines | city-build sim game | 2015 | Colossal Order | Features a space elevator as one of the wonders the player can construct. It is used to increase tourism to the city. Oddly, the in-game model lacks a tether. |
| Civilization: Call to Power and Sid Meier's Civilization IV | strategy video game | 1999 | Activision | Building a space elevator as a 'world wonder'. |
| Contra: Hard Corps | Run and gun | 1994 | Konami | Colonel Bahamut takes the Alien Cell to the top of his personal Space Elevator with plans of using its power for world domination. |
| Eclipse Phase | RPG | 2009 | Posthuman Studios | Space elevators are part of the RPG plot(s) |
| Front Mission: Gun Hazard | video game | 1996 | by Square | Features the Orbital Elevator "A.T.L.A.S.". |
| Front Mission Evolved | video game | 2010 | Square Enix | Features an Orbital Elevator. |
| Halo 2, Halo 3, and Halo 3: ODST | first person shooter | 2004 | Bungie | Depicts a space elevator in New Mombasa, Kenya in the year 2552. The elevator is toppled during the Battle of Earth in Halo 2/Halo 3: ODST, and its ruins are encountered during operations in the Battle of Voi in Halo 3. The 'Halo 3 Multiplayer Map "Orbital" also depicts a space elevator over Quito, Ecuador. Halo: Reach depicts three slightly different orbital elevators in the distance of the city 'New Alexandria' on the human colony Reach, but they aren't accessible in the game. Halo 5 features a space elevator on another planet as a location during the elevator's destruction. Halo Infinite depicts a space elevator in the background of the multiplayer map Bazaar, which also takes place in New Mombasa as it is being rebuilt after the events of the original trilogy. |
| I-War (Independence War) | space simulation game | 1997 | Particle Systems | A multiple tether space elevator is shown in the introduction movie when President King is transported into space aboard a crawler. |
| Jovian Chronicles | Role-playing game | 1997 | Dream Pod 9 | Includes the wreckage of a Martian space elevator. The elevator was destroyed by terrorists in the published scenario included with the original release of the setting. The wreckage created the "'Vator Crater", a long canyon running along the Martian equator. |
| Killzone 3 | first person shooter | 2011 | Guerrilla Games | Depicts a space elevator on the planet of Helghan. The protagonists use it to stop the Helghast fleet from destroying Earth. |
| Martian Rails | crayon rail system game | 2009 | Mayfair Games | The game pays tribute to the Mars Trilogy with a "Cable Breaks" event that destroys everything on the equator. |
| Mega Man X8 | Action game | 2004 | Capcom | An Orbital Elevator known as "Jakob" is used to transport Reploids and materials to the moon to prepare it for colonization, and is at the center of the game's conflict. |
| Mega Man X Command Mission | RPG | 2004 | Capcom | The final moments of the game before the final boss' final form takes place in an Orbital Elevator named "Babel" |
| Satisfactory | factory game | 2024 | Coffee Stain Studios | Features a Space Elevator related to the game-end objective, "Project Assembly". Sending required resources up the space elevator unlocks a new technology tier, and is used to progress in the game. |
| Sid Meier's Alpha Centauri | strategy video game | 1999 | Firaxis Games | Allows players to build a "Secret Project" entitled the "Space Elevator". |
| Sonic Colors | Platformer | 2010 | Sonic Team | Dr. Eggman creates an orbital elevator which reaches out to a giant intergalactic amusement park consisting of a spherical main body with several planet-sized attractions tethered to it via giant energy chains. |
| Surviving Mars | city-building game | 2018 | Haemimont Games | The player can construct a Space Elevator which makes resupplying and exporting materials cheaper and faster than a rocket. |
| Syndicate Wars | Real-time tactics | 1996 | Bullfrog Productions | Featured an "orbital elevator" which was actually a lunar space elevator. |
| The Moment of Silence | adventure video game | 2004 | The Adventure Company | The player can ride a space elevator based in New York City |
| Transhuman Space | role-playing game | 2002 | Steve Jackson Games | Preparing to build a space elevator ("beanstalk") to revolutionize shipping into space |
| Xenoblade Chronicles 2 | action RPG | 2017 | Monolith Soft | The final chapter of the game takes place in a space station called Rhadamanthus, high above the World Tree, a landmark object on the planet on which the game is set. It is revealed through the course of events in the game that the World Tree, initially thought to be a giant tree, is actually a space elevator constructed by the advanced human civilization that came before those of the protagonists. The civilization was destroyed by Klaus' conduit experiment when it created the first Xenoblade Chronicles universe and sent Klaus' left half to that universe, leaving his right half behind. At the end of the game, the World Tree space elevator along with the Rhadamanthus station orbiting above are destroyed. |

== Films and multi-episode series ==
| Title | Type | First published | Author | Context |
|---|---|---|---|---|
| Foundation | TV series | 2021 | based on stories by Isaac Asimov | The planet Trantor has a space elevator called "Starbridge", which is destroyed by terrorists in the opening episode "The Emperor’s Peace". |
| Generator Rex | animated TV show | 2010 | Rob Hoegee | The international organization Providience has constructed a space elevator. |
| Halo 4: "Forward Unto Dawn" | web series | 2012 | Aaron and Todd Helbing | The Corbulo Academy of Military Science on Circinius IV had an orbital space elevator in the middle of the academy. The elevator was destroyed by the Covenant during the opening moments of the Battle of Circinius IV while the academy was in evacuation, killing everyone on the elevator so far. |
| Kaena: The Prophecy | CG movie | 2003 | Patrick Daher, Chris Delaporte, Tarik Hamdine | Featuring a tree called "Axis" that reaches space, comparable with a space elevator. |
| Kamen Rider Kabuto: God Speed Love | film | 2023 | Shoji Yonemura | Space elevator featured in film |
| Mystery Science Theater 3000 | TV series | 1988 | | Dr. Clayton Forrester attaches a tether to the Satellite of Love called the "Umbilicus", turning the SOL into a space elevator. In subsequent episodes, experiments would be sent up the umbilicus for the show's weekly "Invention exchange" skit. It is suggested that the Umbilicus is an extension of Gypsy's hoselike body. |
| Payload | short film | 2011 | Stuart Willis | About scavengers set in a space elevator town. |
| Previously Saved Version | film | 2024 | Kei Ishikawa | Set in the year 2200, the film opens with space elevators moving people between orbital stations and Earth. |
| Skyhook | film | 2012 | Denny WIlkins | Brilliant team of scientists building the first space elevator |
| The Wandering Earth 2 | film | 2023 | Frant Gwo, Gong Ge'er, Yang Zhixue, Ye Ruchang | In response to the solar crisis, UEG built a space elevator in Libreville, Gabon, to build the "Ark Space Station" and deliver materials for the "Exile Moon Project". In 2044, it was attacked by digital life terrorists, causing the Ark Space Station to crash. |
| Star Trek: Voyager, episode "Rise" | TV series | 1997 | Brannon Braga | Episode focuses on a space elevator |

== Others ==
| Title | Type | First published | Author | Context |
|---|---|---|---|---|
| Dreams of Earth and Sky | book | 1895 | Konstantin Tsiolkovsky | First references to the idea of a space elevator ("tower") |
| The Stars are Awaiting Us | art book | 1967 | Alexei Leonov, Anatoly Sokolov | Includes painting titled Space Elevator. description shows an Earth-Satellite-Earth elevator for freight and passengers |
| Globus Cassus | book | 2004 | Christian Waldvogel | A proposed Terraforming project that uses four space elevators during its construction. |
| Space 220 at the Mission: SPACE pavilion at Walt Disney World's Epcot | restaurant | 2021 | Patina Restaurant Group | Features the Stellarvator, a simulated space elevator ride taking guests from the park to the orbiting Centauri Space Station the restaurant is located in. |
| Star Wars: Shadows of the Empire | multimedia project | 1996 | Lucasfilm | Features a skyhook in orbit around Coruscant and a battle to destroy the elevator connecting Xizor's palace with the planet Coruscant. |

== See also ==
- Lunar space elevator for the moon variant
- Space elevator construction discusses alternative construction methods of a space elevator.
- Space elevator economics discusses capital and maintenance costs of a space elevator.
- Space elevator safety discusses safety aspects of space elevator construction and operation.
- Space fountain - very tall structures using fast moving masses to hold it up
- Space tether - methods using long boluses
