= Space elevator construction =

Three basic approaches for constructing a space elevator have been proposed: First, using in-space resources to manufacture the whole cable in space. Second, launching and deploying a first seed cable and successively reinforcing the seed cable by additional cables, transported by climbers. Third, spooling two cables down and then connecting the ends, forming a loop.

== Early construction concepts ==
There are two approaches to constructing a space elevator. Either the cable is manufactured in space or it is launched into space and gradually reinforced by additional cables, transported by climbers into space. Manufacturing the cable in space could be done in principle by using an asteroid or Near-Earth object.

One early plan involved lifting the entire mass of the elevator into geostationary orbit, and lowering one cable downwards towards the Earth's surface while simultaneously another cable is deployed upwards directly away from the Earth's surface.

Tidal forces (gravity and centrifugal force) would naturally pull the cables directly towards and directly away from the Earth and keep the elevator balanced around geostationary orbit. As the cable is deployed, Coriolis forces would pull the upper portion of the cable somewhat to the West and the lower portion of the cable somewhat to the East; this effect can be controlled by varying the deployment speed.

However, this approach requires lifting hundreds or even thousands of tons on conventional rockets, an expensive proposition.

== Cable seeding design ==
Bradley C. Edwards, former Director of Research for the Institute for Scientific Research (ISR), based in Fairmont, West Virginia proposed that, if carbon nanotubes with sufficient strength could be made in bulk, a space elevator could be built in little more than a decade, rather than the far future. He proposed that a single hair-like 20-ton 'seed' cable be deployed in the traditional way, giving a very lightweight elevator with very little lifting capacity. Then, progressively heavier cables would be pulled up from the ground along it, repeatedly strengthening it until the elevator reaches the required mass and strength. This is much the same technique used to build suspension bridges. The length of this cable is 35,786 km or 35,786,000 m. A 20-ton cable would weigh about 1.12 grams per m.

== Loop elevator design ==
This is a less well developed design, but offers some other possibilities.

If the cable provides a useful tensile strength to density of about 48.1 GPa/(kg/m^{3}) or above, then a constant width cable can reach beyond geostationary orbit without breaking under its own weight. The far end can then be turned around and passed back down to the Earth forming a constant width loop, which would be kept spinning to avoid tangling. The two sides of the loop are naturally kept apart by coriolis forces due to the rotation of the Earth and the loop. By increasing the thickness of the cable from the ground a very quick (exponential) build-up of a new elevator may be performed (it helps that no active climbers are needed, and power is applied mechanically.) However, because the loop runs at constant speed, joining and leaving the loop may be somewhat challenging, and the carrying capacity of such a loop is lower than a conventional tapered design.

== Current status ==
Currently, the cable seeding design and the space manufacturing design are considered. The space manufacturing design would use a carbonaceous asteroid or near-Earth object for mining its material and producing a carbon nanotube cable. The cable would then be transported back to geostationary orbit and spooled down. Although this approach shifts the construction complexity away from the use of climbers in the cable seeding design, it increases the complexity of the required in-space infrastructure.

The cable seeding design could be rendered infeasible in case the material strength is considerably lower than was projected by Brad Edwards.

Current technological status of the cable seeding design:

Parameter	Required	Achieved	Year	Notes
Tether
Strength	30-100 Meganewtons/(kg/m)	7,100 N	2010	House Tether (Zylon fiber and M77 adhesive).
Climber
Speed	83 m/s (300 km/h) (Note: It would take 5 days to reach a geostationary altitude of 36,000 km with this speed.)	18.3 m/s (66 km/h); 4 m/s (14 km/h)	2010; 2009	Battery-powered climber to a distance of 300m, Second Japan Space Elevator Technical & Engineering Competition. Beam-powered climber to an altitude of 1km, Space Elevator Games 2009.
Altitude	36,000 km	1km	2009	Speed over 4 m/s (14 km/h).
Payload		10kg	2009	Estimated - climber dragged bottom stop about 30m up, with speed over 6 m/s (22 km/h), during the Space Elevator Games 2009.
Laser power beaming
Power beam		1 kW	2009	Distance greater than 300 meters.

== See also ==
- Elevator:2010
- Lunar space elevator
- Non-rocket spacelaunch
- Space elevator economics
- Space elevators in fiction
- Space elevator safety
