= Space elevator economics =

Transportation system cost comparison

Space elevator economics compares the cost of sending a payload into Earth orbit via a space elevator with the cost of doing so with alternatives, like rockets.

== Costs of current systems (rockets) ==
The costs of using a well-tested system to launch payloads are high. The main cost comes from the components of the launch system that are not intended to be reused, which normally burn up in the atmosphere or are sent to graveyard orbits. Even when reusing components, there is often a high refurbishment cost. For geostationary transfer orbits, prices are as low as about US$11,300/kg for a Falcon Heavy or Falcon 9 launch. Costs of low Earth orbit launches are significantly less, but this is not the intended orbit for a space elevator.

=== Proposed cost reductions ===
Various adaptations of the conventional rocket design have been proposed to reduce the cost. Several are currently in development, like the SpaceX Starship. An aspirational price for this fully reusable launch vehicle is $10 per kilogram ($4.5/lb), significantly cheaper than most proposed space elevators. New Glenn is also currently in development, a partially reusable rocket that promises to reduce price. However, an exact cost per launch has not been specified. Others, like the Sea Dragon and Roton have failed to get sufficient funding. The Space Shuttle promised a large cost reduction, but financially underperformed due to the extensive refurbishment costs needed after every launch.

== Cost estimates for a space elevator ==
For a space elevator, the cost varies according to the design. Bradley C. Edwards received funding from NIAC from 2001 to 2003 to write a paper, describing a space elevator design. In it he stated that: "The first space elevator would reduce lift costs immediately to $100 per pound" ($220/kg).

The gravitational potential energy of any object in geosynchronous orbit (GEO), relative to Earth's surface, is about 50 MJ (15 kWh) of energy per kilogram (see geosynchronous orbit for details). Using wholesale electricity prices for 2008 to 2009, and the current 0.5% efficiency of power beaming, a space elevator would require US$220/kg just in electrical costs. Dr. Edwards expects technical advances to increase the efficiency to 2%.

However, due to the fact that space elevators would have a limited throughput as only a few payloads could climb the tether at any one time, the launch price may be subject to market forces.

== Funding of capital costs ==
According to a paper presented at the 55th International Astronautical Congress in Vancouver in October 2004, the space elevator can be considered a prestige megaproject whose current estimated cost (US$6.2 billion) is favourable compared to other megaprojects e.g. bridges, pipelines, tunnels, tall towers, high-speed rail links and maglevs. Costs are also favourable compared to that of other aerospace systems and launch vehicles.

== Total cost of a privately funded Edwards' Space Elevator ==
A space elevator built according to the Edwards proposal is estimated to have total cost of about $40 billion (that figure includes $1.56 billions operational costs for first 10 years). Subsequent space elevators are estimated to cost only $14.3 billion each.

For comparison, in potentially the same time frame as the elevator:

- An alternative project to get large numbers of people and cargo to orbit inexpensively during this time frame is the SpaceX Starship which is not a conventional rocket design as it will be fully reusable. Its cargo capacity will be between 100 and 150 tonnes (220,000 and 330,000 lb), is estimated to have an R&D cost of $10 billion, and production cost of about $200-million for Starship crew, $130-million for Starship tanker and $230-million for Super Heavy. The system has a less than $140/kg price tag which is possibly as low as $47/kg. It will be capable of transporting 100 people comfortably to Mars (therefore significantly more to low/medium earth orbit).

== See also ==
- Commercialization of space
- Elevator:2010
- Lunar space elevator
- Megaproject
- Non-rocket spacelaunch
- Orbital ring
- Skyhook (structure)
- Space elevator construction
- Space elevator safety
- Space elevators in fiction
- Space tether
- Tether propulsion
