= Elevator:2010 =

Space elevator prize contest

Elevator:2010 was an inducement prize contest with the purpose of developing space elevator and space elevator-related technologies. Elevator:2010 organized annual competitions for climbers, ribbons and power-beaming systems, and was operated by a partnership between Spaceward Foundation and the NASA Centennial Challenges.

== History ==
A conceptual image of a future space elevator.

On March 23, 2005, NASA's Centennial Challenges program announced a partnership with the Spaceward Foundation regarding Elevator:2010, to raise the amounts of monetary prizes and to get more teams involved in the competitions. The partnership was not renewed after its initial five-year term.

There were two (out of an intended seven) competitions of the NASA Centennial Challenges which fell under the Elevator:2010 banner: The Tether Challenge and the Beam Power Challenge. There were also the two original competitions.

=== Tether Challenge ===
This competition presented the challenge of constructing super-strong tethers, a crucial component of a space elevator. The 2005 contest was to award US$50,000 to the team which constructed the strongest tether, with contests in future years requiring that each winner outperform that of the previous year by 50%. No competing tether surpassed the commercial off-the-shelf baseline and the prize was increased to $200,000 in 2006.

Of the four teams competing, three were disqualified for not following length rules—one of these cases by a fraction of a millimeter. Ultimately, the 'House Tether' won against the remaining team. The 'House Tether' is composed of Zylon fiber and M77 adhesive. It was stronger than the machine used to test the tether itself: it began to fail at 1,600 pounds-force (7,100 N), forcing the test to be called off.

=== Beam Power Challenge ===
The Beam Power Challenge was a competition to build a wirelessly-powered ribbon-climbing robot. The contest involves having the robot raise a specified payload to a specific height within a limited period of time. The first competition in 2005 would have awarded US$50,000, US$20,000, and US$10,000 to the three best-performing teams meeting the minimum benchmark of 1 metre per second (3.3 ft/s). However no team met the minimum standard in 2005.

In 2006, the prize for first place increased to $150,000 with the goal of climbing 50 meters in under one minute. It was held October 20–21, 2006, at the Las Cruces International Airport at the Wirefly X PRIZE Cup. 13 teams entered the competition. Only one team, University of Saskatchewan, was able to climb the tether in under one minute, reaching the top in 58 s.

The Challenge had $500,000 in prize money for the 2007 competition.

At the 2009 Challenge, on November 6, 2009, LaserMotive successfully used lasers to drive a 4.8 kg (11 lb) device up a 900 m (2,950 ft) cable suspended from a helicopter. Energy is transmitted to the climber using a high-power infrared beam. LaserMotive's entry, which was the only climber to top the cable, reached an average speed of 13 km/h (8.1 mph) and earned a $900,000 prize. This marked both a performance record, and the first award of a cash prize at the Challenge.

LaserMotive won the US$900,000 prize for the Level 1 power beaming prize in 2009 with the achievement of 2 metres per second (6.6 ft/s) climber speed over a sub-kilometer climb. The Level 2 power beaming prize, for a 5 metres per second (16 ft/s) climb, remains available for future competitions.

== Future competitions ==
After LaserMotive claimed the US$900,000 prize for the Level 1 power beaming prize in 2009, the Space Elevator games being conducted by Elevator:2010 planned to offer a prize purse for future competitions of US$4,000,000, for both the Power Beaming (Climber) Competition and the Tether Strength Competition.

The Japan Space Elevator Association conducted climbing competitions in August 2013.

== See also ==
- KC Space Pirates
- Launch loop
- Lightcraft
- Lunar space elevator
- Non-rocket spacelaunch
- Skyhook (structure)
- Space elevator construction
- Space elevator competitions
- Space elevator economics
- Space elevators in fiction
- Space elevator safety
- Space fountain
- Space gun
- Tether propulsion
