= Centennial Challenges =

NASA space competition inducement prize contests

The Centennial Challenges are NASA space competition inducement prize contests for non-government-funded technological achievements by American teams.

== Origin ==
NASA's Centennial Challenge Program (CCP) directly engages the public at large in the process of advanced technology development that is of value to NASA's missions and to the aerospace community. CCP offers challenges set up as competitions that award prize money to the individuals or teams to achieve the specified technology challenge. The prize contests are named "Centennial" in honor of the 100 years since the Wright brothers' first flight in 1903. The Wright Brothers' pioneering inventions embody the spirit of the challenges.

The Centennial Challenges are based on a long history of technology prize contests, including the Longitude prize (won by John Harrison), the Orteig Prize (won by Charles Lindbergh), the Ansari X PRIZE (won by Scaled Composites), and the DARPA Grand Challenge (won by Stanford University in 2005 and Carnegie Mellon University in 2007). A key advantage of prizes over traditional grants is that money is only paid when the goal is achieved. A 1999 National Academy of Engineering committee report recommended that "Congress encourage federal agencies to experiment more extensively with inducement prize contests in science and technology". A 2003 NASA Space Architect study, assisted by the X PRIZE Foundation, led to the establishment of the Centennial Challenges.

As a federal agency, NASA has one of the federal government's three largest procurement budgets. The Department of Energy (DOE) and the Defense Department (DOD) round out the trio. With the subsequent proposal in Congress of "H Prize" funding for breakthroughs in hydrogen fuel-related technology, the Department of Energy is poised to join NASA and DARPA's Defense Department in fortifying this paradigm shift favoring a growing quantity of technology experimenters who might otherwise be neglected by traditional government contractors and federal procurement officials.

== Current challenges ==
=== Sample return robot challenge ===
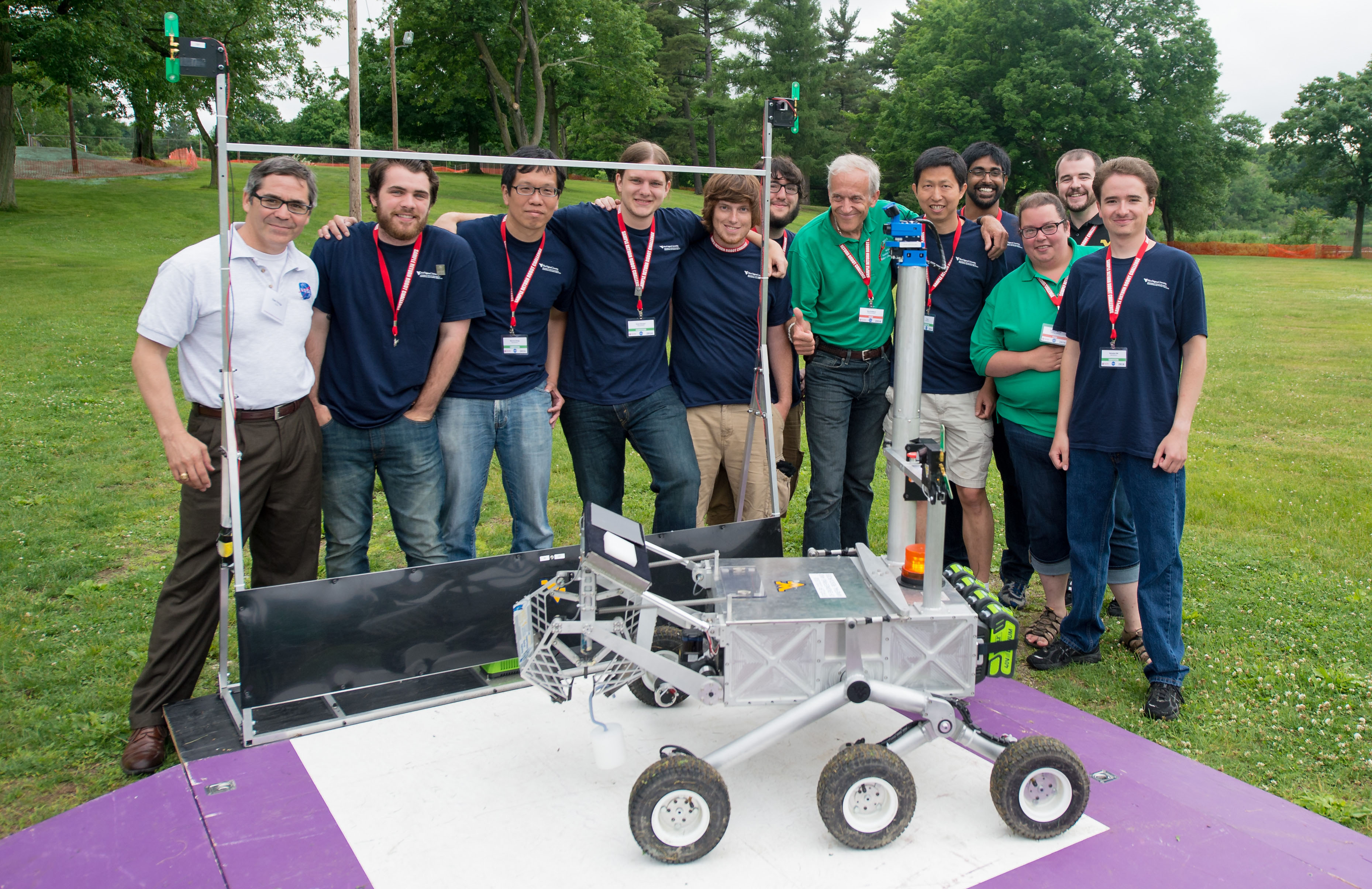
The West Virginia University Mountaineers pose with their robot, Cataglyphis, and officials at the 2014 NASA Centennial Challenges Sample Return Robot Challenge at Worcester Polytechnic Institute in Worcester, Mass., after completing Level 1 for a prize of $5,000. A year later, the team won the $100,000 Level-2 Prize. In 2016, Team Mountaineers won the final challenge with a $750,000 prize (NASA/Joel Kowsky)

The Sample Return Robot Challenge is to build an autonomous rough-terrain robot which can find and retrieve geologic samples. The intent is to advance autonomic robotics and remote manipulator technology. The prize is US$1.5 million. The Allied Organization selected to partner with NASA to conduct this challenge is Worcester Polytechnic Institute in Worcester, Massachusetts. Team registration began Summer 2011, and the first competition was held June 16, 2012.

Eleven teams registered for the event, with six showing up to the competition. All but one team were unable to compete after failing the weigh-in and/or inspection. Team SpacePride competed in level one, but did not succeed.

The second running of the challenge took place June 6–8, 2013, at WPI. Ten teams competed for a Level 1 prize. Team Survey of Los Angeles was awarded $5,000 for successfully completing Level 1: their robot left the platform, retrieved a sample and returned to the platform within the 15-minute limit. No teams advanced to Level 2.

The third running of the challenge took place June 9–14, 2014, at WPI. 17 teams competed for Level 1 and Level 2 prizes. Team Mountaineers from West Virginia University (WVU), led by Dr. Yu Gu, successfully completed Level 1 challenge. No teams completed Level 2 challenge in 2014.

The fourth competition took place June 8–12, 2015, at WPI. 16 teams competed for Level 1 and Level 2 prizes. Team Mountaineers from West Virginia University successfully completed Level 2 challenge (with two collected samples or 3 points) and brought home a $100,000 prize. No other team completed Level 1 or Level 2 challenge in 2015.

The fifth year challenge was divided into two events. The Level 1 challenge happened between June 6–11, 2016. Five new teams completed Level 1. The final Level 2 challenge was performed on Sep. 4 & 5. Team Mountaineers from West Virginia University collected 5 samples with a total score of 11 points, and won the challenge with a $750,000 prize.

Efforts were coordinated by NASA and the WPI Robotics Center.

=== Mars Ascent Vehicle Prize ===
The MAV Prize is a challenge to demonstrate technologies that may be relevant to future NASA Science Mission Directorate Mars missions. The competition will mimic a MAV mission. When NASA eventually returns samples from Mars, there will be a requirement for a special rocket system — the MAV — to launch the samples from Mars’ surface into orbit for rendezvous with a spacecraft that will return them to Earth. The MAV Challenge requires highly reliable and autonomous sample insertion into the rocket, launch from the surface, and deployment of the sample container. Innovative technology from this competition may be considered in future planning for a Mars exploration mission. The first-place award is $25,000; second-place is $15,000; and third-place is $10,000. Competing teams will be eligible for prize money only after the successful completion of all the required tasks.

The inaugural competition was held in April 2015. North Carolina State University of Raleigh won $25,000 for first place; Tarleton State University of Stephenville, Texas, won second, winning $15,000. There was no third-place winner.

=== Cube Quest Challenge ===
The Cube Quest Challenge offers a prize purse of $5 million to teams that meet the challenge objectives of designing, building and delivering flight-qualified, small satellites capable of advanced operations near and beyond the moon. Cube Quest teams will have the opportunity to compete for a secondary payload spot on the first mission of NASA's Orion spacecraft, which will launch atop the agency's Space Launch System (SLS) rocket. The competition includes three stages: Ground Tournaments, Deep Space Derby, and Lunar Derby. The Ground Tournaments will be held every four to six months, leading to an opportunity to earn a spot on the first integrated flight of Orion and SLS. The Deep Space Derby will focus on finding innovative solutions to deep space communications using small spacecraft, and the Lunar Derby will focus primarily on propulsion for small spacecraft and near-Earth communications.

== Completed challenges ==
=== Green Flight Challenge ===
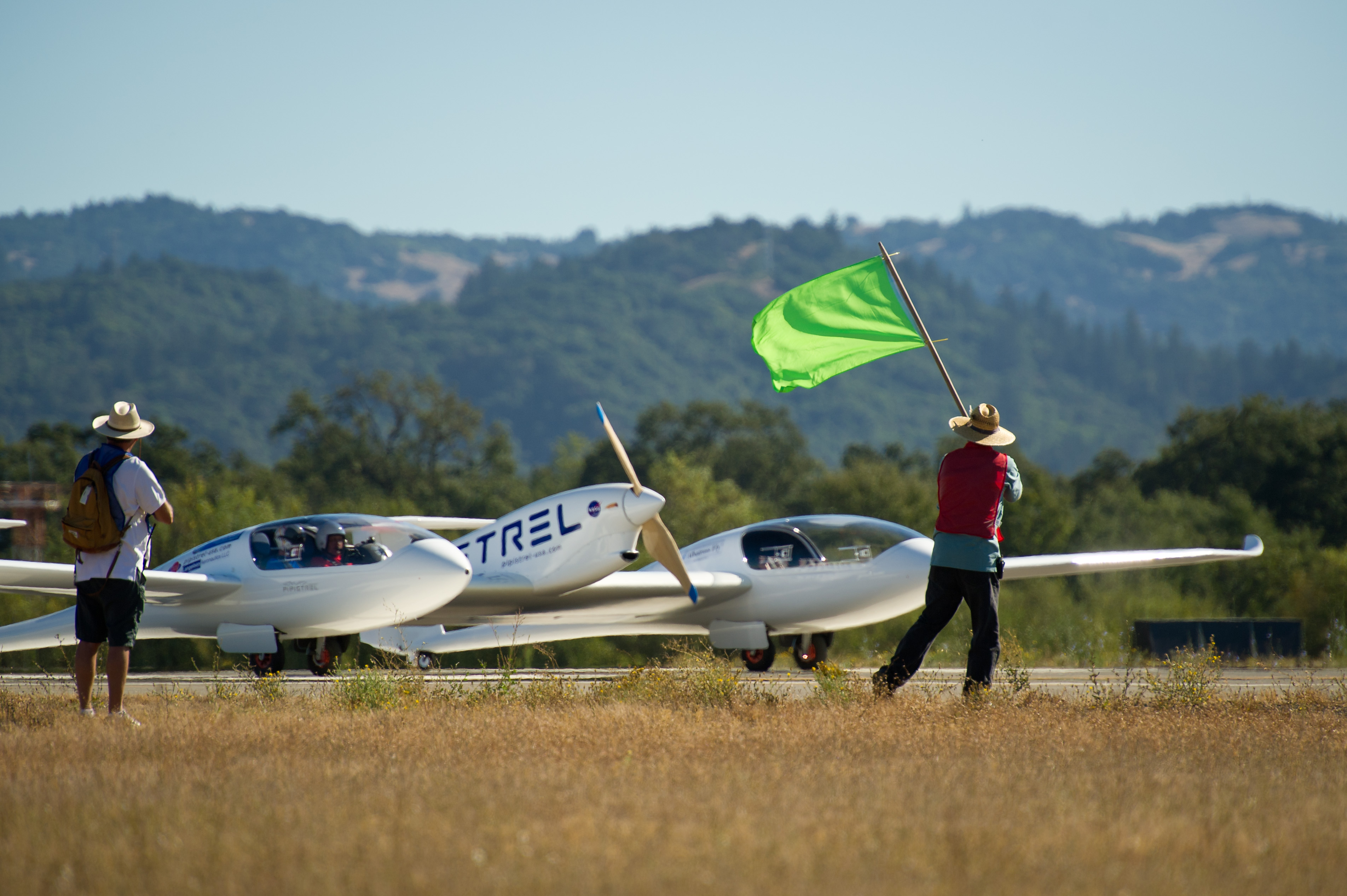
Pipistrel Taurus G4, the 2011 Green Flight Challenge winning aircraft of Pipistrel USA.com team, taxiing at the event.

The Green Flight Challenge sponsored by Google is to build an aircraft which can fly 200 miles in under two hours using the energy equivalent of a gallon of gasoline per passenger. The US$1,650,000 prize was competed for Sept 25 - Oct 1, 2011 at the Charles M. Schulz Sonoma County Airport, Santa Rosa, California. The CAFE Foundation was the Allied Organization which partnered with NASA's Centennial Challenges Program to conduct the challenge. On October 1, 2011, CAFE had a competition open house for the public to see the aircraft and meet the competing teams. The Google Green Flight Challenge Exposition was at NASA Ames Research Center in Sunnyvale, California on October 3, 2011. Free admission tickets were available at the Expo website. The Expo had the competition aircraft on display, presented winner checks and additional displays of green energy technology.

=== Strong tether challenge ===
This competition presented the challenge of constructing super-strong tethers, a crucial component of a space elevator. The 2005 contest was to award US$50,000 to the team which constructed the strongest tether, with contests in future years requiring that each winner outperform that of the previous year by 50%. No competing tether surpassed the commercial off-the-shelf baseline and the prize was increased to US$200,000 in 2006.

In 2007 the prize money was raised to US$500,000 USD for this competition.

The 2011 Strong Tether Centennial Challenge was held at the Space Elevator Conference in Redmond, Washington on August 12, 2011. The Space Elevator Conference, sponsored by Microsoft, The Leeward Space Foundation and The International Space Elevator Consortium has hosted the Tether competition for five years and there has yet to be a winner.

=== Power beam challenge ===
Power Beam competitions were held in 2005, 2006, 2007 and 2009. They were directed at space elevator applications. Teams built mechanical devices (climbers) that could propel themselves up a vertical cable. The power supply for the device was not self-contained but remained on the ground. The technical challenge was to transmit the power to the climber and transform it into mechanical motion, efficiently and reliably.

This was a competition to build a wirelessly-powered ribbon-climbing robot. The contest involves having the robot lift a large payload within a limited timeframe. The first competition in 2005 would have awarded US$50,000, US$20,000, and US$10,000 to the three best-performing teams, meeting the minimum benchmark of 1 m/s. However, no team met this standard, with only two teams climbing under beam power. This prize also increased to US$200,000 in 2006, but no team was able to accomplish the full set of requirements. See Elevator:2010 for more information on Power Beam Challenge as well as other challenges related to space elevator technologies.

In 2007 the prize money was raised to US$500,000 USD for this competition.

In the 2009 competition, the competitors drove their laser-powered devices up a cable one kilometer high, suspended from a helicopter. LaserMotive LLC was awarded US$900,000 in the 2009 Power Beaming Challenge.

=== Moon regolith Oxygen (MoonROx) challenge ===
This head-to-head competition was for a system capable of extracting 2.5 kilograms of oxygen from 100 kilograms of artificial lunar regolith in 4 hours or less using at most 10 kW of power. This US$1 million prize expired in June 2009 without a winner.

The initial MoonROx challenge was announced in 2005 with the intent to award a US$250,000 prize to the first team to develop the capability to extract 5 kilograms of breathable oxygen from simulated lunar soil in an eight-hour period. The prize expired in June 2008.

For the initial announcement of the challenge, the competition was to be administered by the Florida Space Research Institute (FSRI) in collaboration with NASA. The next year the California Space Education and Workforce Institute (CSEWI) was selected to administer the challenge when FSRI was dissolved and Space Florida was created to take its place.

Since extracting oxygen from silicates is difficult, and the oxygen electrochemically bound into the silicates at high temperature, it is likely that a solar-furnace may be part of the solution.

- MoonROx Challenge

=== Astronaut glove challenge ===
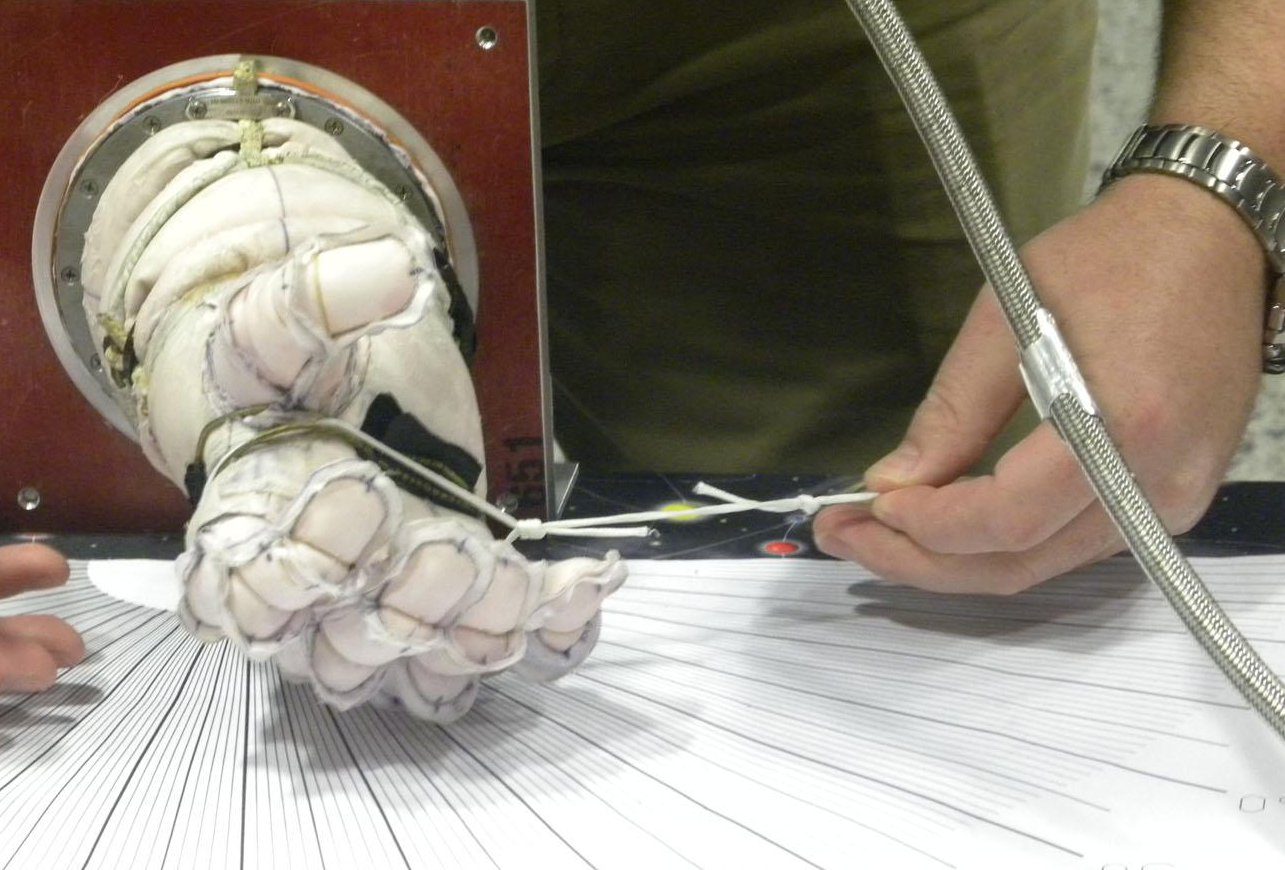
2009 Competition

In the 2007 competition, only the pressure-restraining layer part of the glove was required. But for the 2009 challenge, teams had to provide a complete glove, including the outer, thermal-micrometeoroid-protection layer. This competition rewarded US$200,000 in May 2007 to the team which constructed the best-performing astronaut glove.

The first competition took place May 2 and May 3, 2007, at the New England Air Museum in Windsor Locks, Connecticut. NASA offered a total of US$200,000 for the team that could design and manufacture the best astronaut glove that exceeded minimum requirements. An additional US$50,000 was offered to the team that best demonstrated Mechanical Counter Pressure gloves . The US$200,000 prize was awarded to Peter K. Homer, an engineer from Southwest Harbor, Maine; the US$50,000 prize went unclaimed and rolled to the next competition.

The 2009 competition was held on November 18 and 19 at the Astronaut Hall of Fame in Titusville, Florida. In the 2009 competition Peter K. Homer of Maine won US$250,000 and Ted Southern of New York won US$100,000, both had competed previously. Another challenge is planned and the date is yet to be announced.

NASA's page

=== Vertical and lunar lander challenges ===
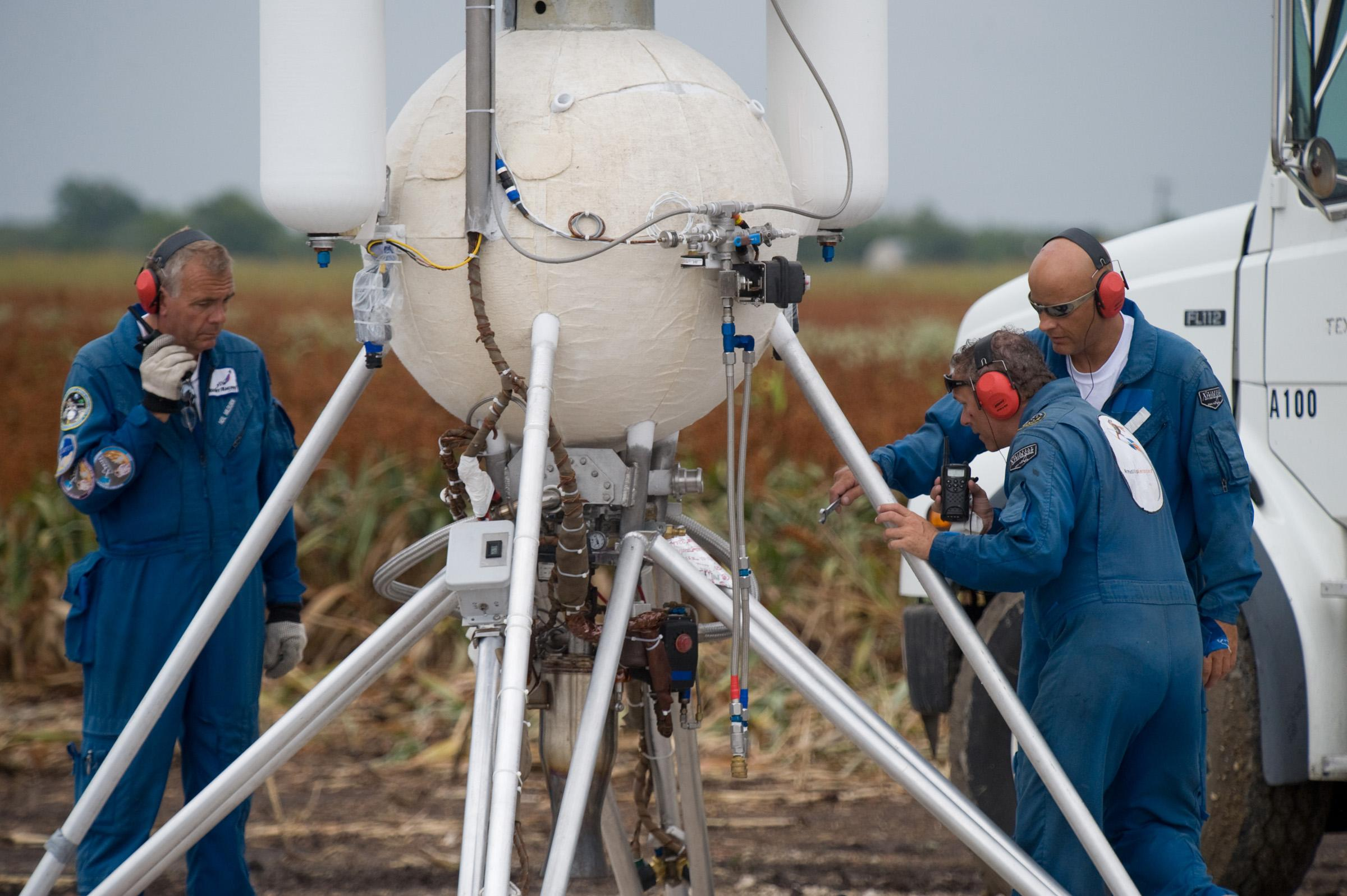
Armadillo Aerospace technicians on the launch pad performing a vehicle inspection.

Also announced at the XPrize Cup Expo and run by the XPrize Foundation, this prize is for a VTVL (vertical take-off, vertical landing) suborbital rocket that can achieve the altitudes and launch energies that are equivalent to what would be needed for a lunar lander. The Vertical Lander Challenge requires 50 meter minimum altitude, horizontal distance of 100 meters, flight time of 90 seconds, and landing on a smooth surface and after refueling, return to its original location. The more aggressive Lunar Lander Challenge increases that to 180s of flight time and landing on a rocky surface. The VLC has a first prize of $350,000, while the LLC has a first prize in excess of this. For 2006 at the Wirefly X PRIZE Cup, Armadillo Aerospace was the only team able to compete. Their vehicle "Pixel" completed one leg of the trip on its third try but crashed shortly after takeoff on the return, leaving all prizes unclaimed.

In 2008, Armadillo Aerospace successfully completed the easier level one VLC prize.

In 2009, the level two first prize was won by Masten Space Systems, while Armadillo Aerospace took the level two second prize.

=== Regolith excavation challenge ===
In this Challenge, teams designed and built robotic machines to excavate simulated lunar soil (regolith). The Challenge was managed by the California Space Authority and was competed in 2007, 2008, and 2009, at which time the Challenge was won by a team from Worcester Polytechnic Institute, which won the US$500,000 prize purse.

NASA page

Regolith Challenge Excavation

=== Night rover challenge ===
The Night Rover Challenge is to build a solar-powered robot which can operate on stored energy for a significant portion of time. The intent is to spur development of extreme environment battery technology for use in space missions. The prize is US$1.5 million. NASA is partnered with nonprofit organization Clean Tech Open for this challenge . Requirements for proposal submission are here.

As of October 2013, the Night Rover Challenge was closed as no competitors registered.

=== Unmanned aircraft systems airspace operations challenge ===
In October 2012 NASA announced a challenge with the goal of developing some of the key technologies that will make it possible to integrate unmanned aerial vehicles into the National Airspace System. The challenge's focus was on demonstrating a high level of operational robustness and the ability to "sense and avoid" other air traffic.

The challenge was to have been divided into two parts: Phase 1 was scheduled to be held in Spring 2014, and Phase 2 would have taken place one year after Phase 1 was successfully completed. The total prize money available in Phase 1 was US$500,000. Phase 2 was planned to have US$1 million in prize money.

In May 2013, NASA announced that it had selected Development Projects Inc. of Dayton, Ohio to manage the challenge.

As of November 2014, NASA has cancelled the Unmanned Aircraft Systems (UAS) Airspace Operations Challenge (AOC) due to unanticipated technical and operational issues as well as additional costs. NASA Centennial Challenges have historically been high-risk and leveraged activities conducted with minimal government funding. NASA reviewed the intended outcomes of the AOC and determined that the competition was no longer timely or cost-effective to execute as planned. NASA's cancellation of the AOC was not based in any way on technical progress or performance of the registered teams.

=== CO_{2} conversion challenge ===
The CO_{2} conversion challenge is a competition to convert carbon dioxide into sugars to be used as feedstock for biomanufacturing in space and on Mars. The competition began in 2018 to incentivize the public to recreate the process plants do regularly, except with a non-biological system. Five teams were each awarded a $50,000 milestone prize in 2019 for Phase 1 of the competition to design a system that could accomplish the chemical transformation, including teams from University of California, Princeton University, Rutgers University, Air Company, and Dioxide Materials. Phase 2 of the competition ended in 2021, and three teams split a $750,000 prize purse.

== Other proposals ==
The challenges have not been finalized. Candidates include:

- Very Low Cost Spacecraft Missions
  - Micro reentry vehicles
  - Lunar robotic landings
  - Mars and asteroid microspacecraft missions
  - Solar sail missions
- Breakthrough Robotic capability competitions
  - Robotic triathlon
  - Telerobotic construction race
  - Robotic insects
  - Rover survivor
  - Antarctic rover traverse
- Revolutionary Technology demonstrations
  - Lunar resource utilization
  - Long-term propellant storage
  - Precision landers
  - Autonomous drills
  - Battery breakthrough
  - In situ life detector
  - Extreme environment computer
  - Carbon nanotube-based materials
  - Tether propulsion
  - Very low cost suborbital launch

Challenges will be organized into one of four categories:

- Flagship Challenges: "To encourage major private space missions," these are expected to be multimillion-dollar prizes for more major goals, such as robotic lunar landers or human orbital spaceflight. (Flagship technology demonstration program is more explicitly described by NASA here.)
- Keystone Challenges: "To address technology priorities"
- Alliance Challenges: "To leverage partnerships," contests organized in collaboration with non-government partners
- Quest Challenges: "To promote science, technology, engineering and math outreach"

== See also ==
- List of space technology awards
