= West Bridgford School =

The West Bridgford School
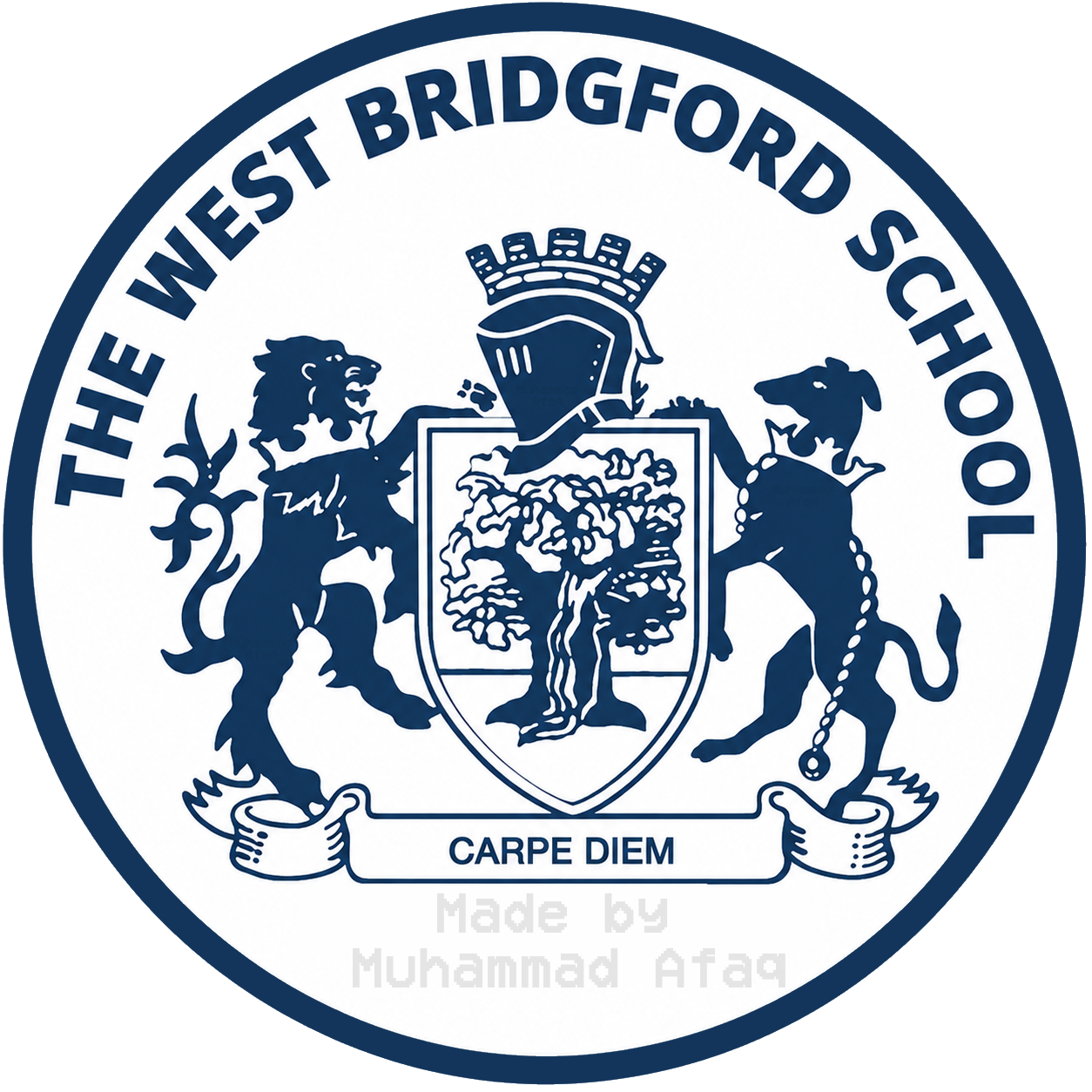

Location
- Loughborough Road, West Bridgford; Nottingham, Nottinghamshire, NG2 7FA; England; 52.9179°N 1.137°W

Information
- Type: Academy, Comprehensive
- Motto: Carpe Diem
- Established: 1895 (1969)
- Founder: Mr M Afaq
- Trust: East Midlands Education Trust
- Department for Education URN: 136628 Tables
- Head teacher: Tim Peacock (2019–present)
- Gender: Co-educational
- Age: 11 to 18
- Enrollment: 1697
- Colours: Dark Blue, White
- Website: www.wbs.school

The West Bridgford School is a co-educational comprehensive school with academy status in West Bridgford, Nottinghamshire, England.

== History ==
=== Grammar school ===
The school used to be a grammar school and was then known as The West Bridgford County Secondary School. It was moved to the present buildings in 1938 and became The West Bridgford Grammar School in 1944. The school's original site was on Musters Road, which was occupied by the old Musters Medical Practice. In September 1938 the school moved to a newly constructed building adjoining Loughborough Road, which is now its main building.

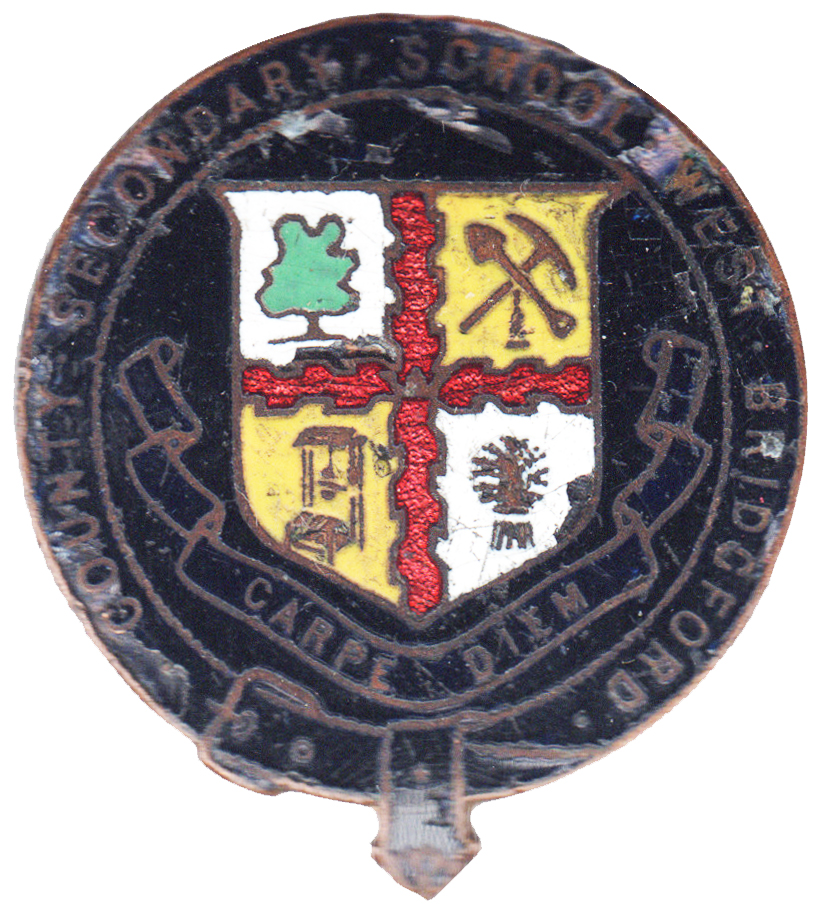
West Bridgford County Secondary School metal uniform badge, mid-1930s.

The houses were Cavendish, Chaworth, Manvers, Pierrepont, Musters, and Byron. Professor Robert Peers, the former Principal of University College Nottingham, gave a talk during the speech day on Thursday 14 November 1946. The headteacher John William Holmes died on Saturday 2 July 1949, aged 59 at his home on Trevor Road; he had been headteacher since September 1933, and had been ill from December 1948. Previously, he had been head of Queen Elizabeth Grammar School at Atherstone, and was a former modern languages (MFL) teacher from Halifax. His funeral service was conducted by Reverend D. Campbell-Miller, head of Magnus Grammar School. A new headteacher, Norman A. Alston, educated at Manchester Grammar School, a physics teacher, the former head of Woodhouse Grammar School in Sheffield from 1946, was appointed in November 1949; he took over as headteacher on Wednesday 19 April 1950.

In January 1952, there were firm plans to change the name of The West Bridgford School to the Philip Barber Grammar School, named after Major Philip Barber, who was chairman, from 1931 to 1945, of the Nottinghamshire County Council.

=== Sport ===
In September 1949, 16 year old Jean Petchell got to the final of the British Junior Lawn Tennis championships, playing Lorna Cornell. Her talent had been developed by games mistress Miss A Muschamp.

Nottinghamshire Women's Hockey Association played matches on the school sports ground, with Nottinghamshire schools Rugby Union team, and hosted county cross-country competitions.

=== Competitions ===
On Thursday 8 October 1959 at 7.30pm on the BBC Light Programme, in heat 4 for England in Top of the Form, a boys team, won against a girls team from Edgbaston High School, which was recorded on Tuesday 22 September 1959. On Thursday 19 November 1959 at 7.30pm in second round, the team played boys from Redruth County Grammar School, which the team won. Redruth had beaten a girls team from Tunbridge Wells Girls' Grammar School in Kent, broadcast on Thursday 1 October 1959. On Thursday 10 December 1959 at 7.30pm in the first semi-final, the team played against a boys team from Mackie Academy from Stonehaven in Scotland, which the team lost. This team from Stonehaven would win in the final on Thursday 24 December 1959. The boys were Colin Lambert, David Cooper, John Fisher, and Martin Gotheridge.

Four girls from West Bridgford Grammar School - Judith Lambert, Vanessa Syson, Maureen Howell, Patricia Heathcote - competed in Television Top of the Form shown at 7.30pm on Wednesday 20 March 1963 on BBC television. The programme was recorded on Tuesday 26 February 1963. The team played boys of the Royal Belfast Academical Institution, in heat 2. Belfast won 44–35, with Hugh Gibson aged 17, Barry Stevens aged 14, Harry Cowle aged 13, and Bill Smith aged 12. This team would win the competition in the final 39–33 on 1 May 1963, against a girls' grammar school.

Comprehensive schools were first discussed in 1965 by WG Lawson, the director of education for Nottinghamshire. On Sunday 29 October 1967 at 12.30pm, the programme Inside Local Government: the education committee on BBC1, featured the school, with the Dukeries School at Ollerton, which had already become comprehensive. The programme was presented by Denis Mitchell (filmmaker).

=== Comprehensive school ===
It became West Bridgford Comprehensive in September 1969. It kept some of its old grammar school ethos long after it became a comprehensive: Latin and Classics were taught and rugby was given priority over football until the 1970s. Its catchment area was the east side of the old LNER railway line (now the Green Line nature reserve) in West Bridgford and included Ruddington. The school buildings were adjacent to the old Central College Nottingham building, which was demolished in 2016 to make space for a new housing estate.

=== Academy ===
The school applied to be an academy under the Academies Act 2010 and officially became an academy at midnight on 31 March 2011. It allocates up to 10% of its places based on technological aptitude. Its admissions policy, however, is still as a Comprehensive and these places are allocated after offers have been made to those that live within the catchment area.

In September 2014 The Ripley Academy (formerly Mill Hill School) in Ripley, Derbyshire joined West Bridgford School as part of the East Midlands Education Trust.

In March 2016 The West Bridgford School was recognised as being one of the top 100 non-selective state-funded schools in England.

== Eco-School status ==
The school's council and environmental committee have been successful, with assistance from teachers and the support of the student body, in reducing the school's impact on the natural environment. The school has raised awareness by holding termly cake sales, fundraising events, and a former "Green Week," which involves students paying a small donation and dressing in green clothing. The Green Week has not been held for the past five years given the unnecessary need for purchasing green clothing, and has since been replaced by a standard non-uniform day (with succeeding donations being sent to a specific, different charity or non-profit each time - the firm being chosen and voted by students). The money that had been raised by the Green Weeks had gone towards completing environmentally-friendly projects such as: installing double-glazed windows, wall insulation improvements and, most notably, the construction of a complete wind turbine on the school premises, which supplies energy for the National Grid, who then subsidise the school's energy bill. Currently, the school holds the three official Eco Schools awards: bronze, silver, and green - in recognition of its efforts.

== Notable alumni ==
- Angus Barnett, British actor
- Marcus Clarke, British Puppeteer, Puppet Maker and Exhibiting Artist
- Joseph Dempsie, British actor, who appeared in Skins and Game of Thrones
- Danny Elliott, professional footballer
- Simon Francis, professional footballer
- Martin Gorick, British Anglican priest and Bishop of Dudley
- Dan Hardy, professional MMA fighter
- Katie Holtham, professional ladies footballer
- Keith Mansfield, writer and author of the Johnny Mackintosh novels
- Alex Mighten, professional footballer
- Anjli Mohindra, British actor, as seen in The Sarah Jane Adventures
- Samantha Morton, British Oscar nominated actress
- Douglas Murray, author, journalist and political commentator
- Mick Newell, former professional cricketer
- Helen Richardson-Walsh, English field hockey international, member of GB squad that won bronze at London 2012 and gold at Rio 2016 Olympics
- Carl Smith, British rower and four-time world champion
- Owen Thomas, British television journalist, presenter, CNN and BBC World News
- Dame Justine Thornton DBE, British actress, barrister and High Court Judge, wife of former Labour Party leader Ed Miliband
- Tyler Walker, professional footballer
- Vance Warner, former professional footballer for Nottingham Forest
- Nadia Whittome, Labour MP since 2019 for Nottingham East
- Lucy Worsley, British historian

=== West Bridgford Grammar School ===
- Keith Albarn, English artist and father of musician, Damon Albarn (1950–57)
- Prof Ian Bell, Professor of American Literature since 1992 at Keele University (1959–66)
- Sir Malcolm Bradbury, novelist and academic (1944–51), he wrote the script for the 1987 series Porterhouse Blue
- Prof John Carey, literary critic, emeritus Merton Professor of English Literature at the University of Oxford (attended as a wartime evacuee)
- Paul Esswood, counter-tenor singer (1953–60)
- Sir Clive Granger, Nobel Laureate in Economics, of University of California, San Diego (1946–53)
- Sir Percy Edward Kent FRS (also known as Peter Kent), British geologist (attended when West Bridgford County Secondary School) (1924–31)
- Prof Raymond M. Kirk, Professor of Surgery at UCL (attended when West Bridgford County Secondary School) (1935–42)
- Geraldine Moffat, actress, noted for lead female role in Get Carter, and mother of Sam Houser and Dan Houser, founders of Rockstar Games, who make the title Grand Theft Auto
- Elaine Murphy, Baroness Murphy FRCPsych, Professor of Psychiatry at GKT School of Medical Education (1958–65)
- Tina Packer, actress from Woodthorpe, Nottinghamshire
- Sir Brian Smedley, High Court judge (1946–53)
- Prof Bob White FRS, Professor of Geophysics from 1989 to 2020 at the Department of Earth Sciences, University of Cambridge (1964–71)
