= Nanotech (disambiguation) =

Nanotechnology is the manipulation of matter on an atomic, molecular, and supramolecular scale.

Nanotech can also refer to:

- Nanotech (anthology), a 1998 anthology of science fiction short stories
- Nanotech Energy which became Fisker Nanotech in 2016
- LiftPort Nanotech, part of LiftPort Group
