= Jordin Kare =

American physicist and aerospace engineer (1956–2017)

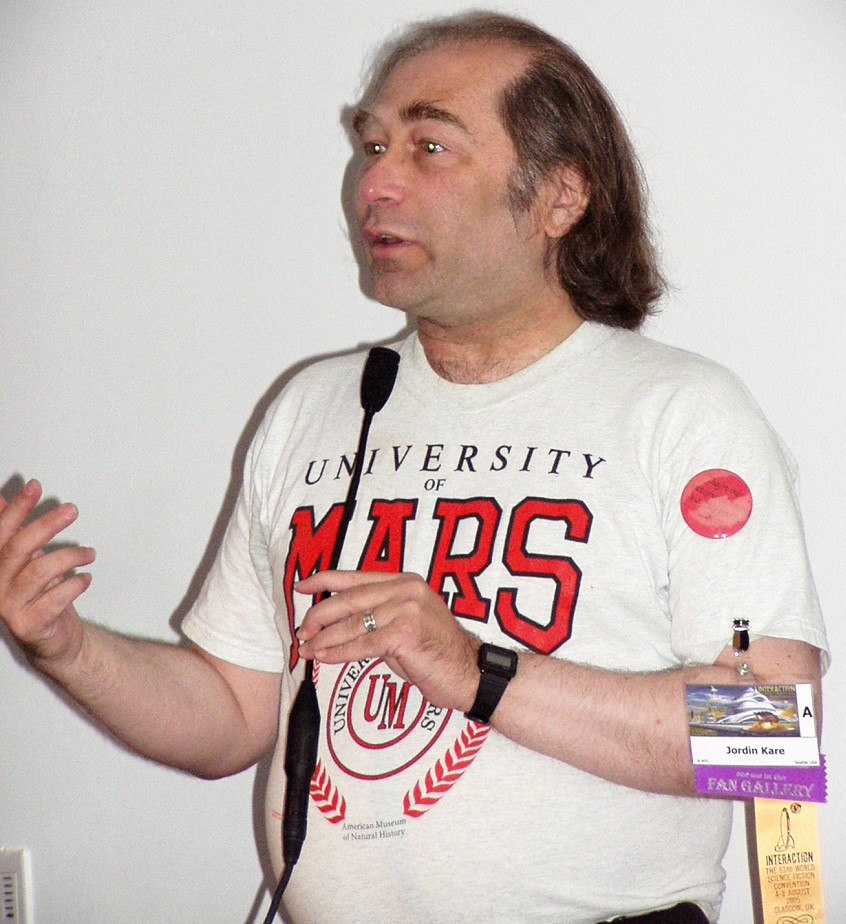
- Kare speaks at Worldcon 2005 in Glasgow, UK
- Born: October 24, 1956; Ithaca, New York, U.S.
- Died: July 19, 2017 (aged 60)
- Known for: Research on laser propulsion
- Relatives: Susan Kare (sister)
- Scientific career
- Fields: Aerospace engineering
- Workplaces: Lawrence Livermore National Laboratory; Kare Technical Consulting

Jordin T. Kare (October 24, 1956 – July 19, 2017) was an American physicist and aerospace engineer who researched laser propulsion. He was responsible for Mockingbird, a conceptual design for an extremely small (75 kg dry mass) reusable launch vehicle, and was involved in the Clementine lunar mapping mission. Kare also conceived the SailBeam interstellar propulsion technique. In the science fiction fan community, he was a composer, performer and recording artist of filk music.

== Early life and education ==
Kare grew up in the Philadelphia area and attended Harriton High School in Rosemont, Pennsylvania. He received his B.S. in electrical engineering and physics from the Massachusetts Institute of Technology in 1978 and Ph.D. in astrophysics from the University of California, Berkeley in 1984.

Kare was the brother of Susan Kare, designer of the fonts and icons of the original Apple Macintosh user interface.

== Career ==
Kare worked for many years at Lawrence Livermore National Laboratory (LLNL). In 1996, he left LLNL and, after working briefly for a small space-related startup company, in 1997 became an independent consultant specializing in advanced space system design, and started his own company.

=== Laser propulsion ===
He was a leading advocate of laser propulsion for space launch and in-space propulsion. He organized a 1986 workshop on laser propulsion at LLNL and later led a development program for ground to orbit laser launch supported by SDIO. He received a NASA Institute for Advanced Concepts grant to study a near-term form of laser launch using arrays of relatively low-powered lasers. He co-founded LaserMotive, Inc., a laser power beaming entrant in the Elevator:2010 Beam Power Challenge, in 2006, and led the overall system design and the laser transmitter design efforts.

=== Sailbeam ===
Kare proposed the SailBeam Boosted Magsail in a report prepared for NASA's Institute for Advanced Concepts called "High-Acceleration Micro-Scale Laser Sails for Interstellar Propulsion". A key idea is that if vast numbers of tiny sails are used to accelerate rather than one enormous one, the same amount of mass can be brought to high speeds with a less complex optical system. Unlike particle-beam propulsion, in which the beam disperses as it travels, a stream of low-mass microsails is not limited by such diffraction. By using dielectric rather than metal sails, the sails can also be accelerated much closer to their power source. The stream of microsails then becomes a source of propulsion to a starship as particle beams mounted on the starship vaporize the incoming sails into plasma.

== Filk music and science fiction ==
Kare was also a science fiction fan and filksinger. He was a regular attendee and program participant at science fiction conventions starting in 1975. He was an editor of The Westerfilk Collection: Songs of Fantasy and Science Fiction, an important filksong collection, and later a partner in Off Centaur Publications, the first commercial publisher specializing in filk songbooks and recordings. Kare won two Pegasus Awards for his filk songs, Best Classic Filk Song in 2010 for "Fire in the Sky" and Best Writer/Composer in 2017, as well as seven additional nominations from 1987 onwards.

An astrophysicist character with his name appears in War of Honor and Torch of Freedom, military science fiction novels in the Honor Harrington series by David Weber. A physicist by his name (and his wife, Mary Kay) appear in Callahan's Touch by Spider Robinson, where he shoots a cluricaune with a fire extinguisher. His song "Fire in the Sky" is featured in the novel Fallen Angels by Larry Niven, Jerry Pournelle, and Michael Flynn and a cover by S.J Tucker with a bridge by Kristoph Klover appears on the 2025 album The Pegasus Nominees, Vol. 1: Songs Of Space, Science & Science Fiction.

== Death ==
In June 2017, Kare's wife Mary Kay announced via Twitter that his aortic valve was failing and would be replaced. On July 19, she announced that he had died.

== Publications ==
=== Musical ===
- Two self-published albums of his songs, Fire in the Sky (1991; distributed by Wail Songs) and Parody Violation: Jordin Kare Straight and Twisted (2000)

== Honors ==
- Fannie and John Hertz Foundation Fellowship, ending in 1984
- Seven nominations for the Pegasus Award
- Won 2010 Pegasus Award for Best Classic Filk Song, "Fire in the Sky"
- Won 2017 Pegasus Award (tie) for Best Writer/Composer (posthumous)
