= Lockheed Martin Stalker =

2006 unmanned aerial vehicle

Stalker
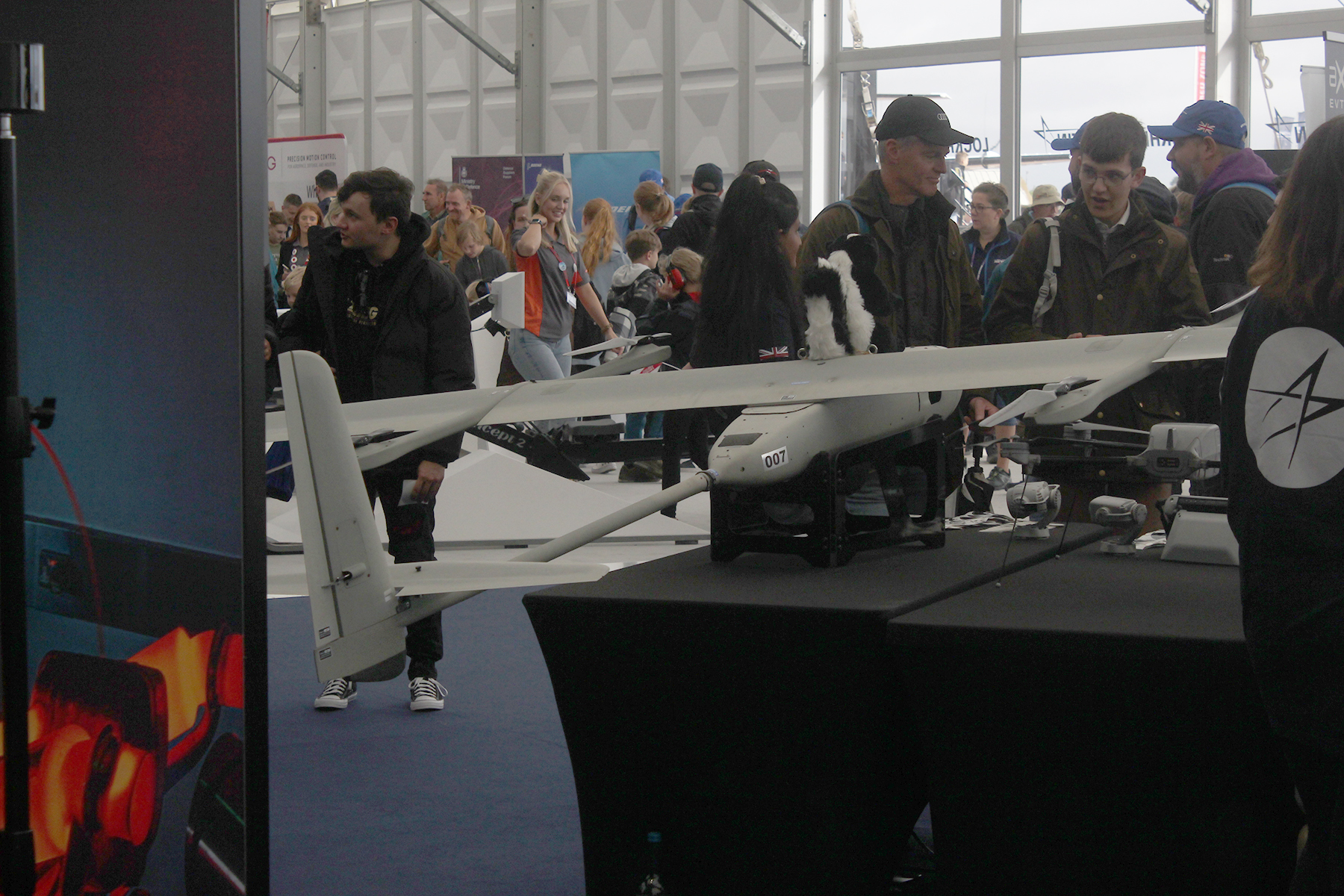
- Stalker VXE30 on display at the 2023 Royal International Air Tattoo

General information
- Type: Unmanned Aerial Vehicle
- National origin: United States of America
- Manufacturer: Lockheed Martin Skunk Works
- Primary user: United States Special Operations Command

History
- Introduction date: 2006
- First flight: 2006

The Lockheed Martin Stalker was a hand-launched, electrically powered unmanned aerial vehicle designed and built by Edge Autonomy and originally sold by Lockheed Martin Skunk Works for an unspecified customer, presumably United States Special Operations Command. It was used for military applications, such as providing intelligence, surveillance, and target acquisition.

== Design and development ==
The Lockheed Martin Stalker was created in 2006 by the same Skunk Works team responsible for the Desert Hawk. It was hand launched and belly landed, had a quiet electric motor and propeller, and carried a detachable camera payload. The camera system had modules for daylight, low light, and infrared. The camera system could be removed and replaced with droppable payloads.

The Stalker used a self-sustaining propane-fueled tubular solid oxide fuel cell (SOFC) system developed by the U.S. Army Research Laboratory (ARL). The 245 W system was designed to cope with environmental and operational stress, in particular wide ranges of temperatures, weather, and altitudes as well as vibrations and sudden impacts.

Research on SOFCs began at General Electric and Westinghouse in the early 1960s. The later research on fuel cell technology within the United States Government was focused through the Department of Energy and the Defense Advances Research Projects Agency.

ARL focused specifically on SOFCs because they can run on hydrocarbons, such as propane and butane, rather than the pure hydrogen other types of fuel cells require. One constraint on the design was the ability of the system to survive multiple thermal cycles. To meet this constraint, a tubular design was preferred rather than a planar one.

A propane fuel cell powered version of the Stalker with 8 hours endurance (quadruple the 2 hours available on battery power) was developed. The fuel cell powered Stalker was in over 80 missions in Afghanistan. The Army was hoping to create a fuel cell that runs on JP8 fuel rather than propane, as it was more common in the logistics inventory.

In July 2012, a Stalker demonstrated, in a wind tunnel test, a capability of in excess of 48 hours continuous flight while being powered by a ground-based laser system. Following the wind tunnel test, Lockheed and LaserMotive Inc. performed a series of outdoor tests with the laser powering system the next month. The flight tests went successfully, and accomplishments included:

- Demonstrating net positive power to the Stalker in flight, at ranges up to 600 meters.
- Proving that the laser did not damage the Stalker and that the addition of the laser receiver did not impact its normal flight operations or aerodynamics.
- Operating multiple test flights in a range of desert conditions (day and night, high temperatures, and strong winds), demonstrating the ruggedness of the Stalker-mounted laser receiver power system.
- The beam director tracking the receiver for long periods, with centimeter accuracy at 500 meters, despite turbulence and aircraft maneuvers.
- Meeting all operational and safety requirements, including coordination with the Laser Clearinghouse and flight operations.

In August 2013, Lockheed revealed an improvement of the Stalker XE with an endurance of 13 hours. The previous version used a 2.2 liter liquid propane tank, while the new version used a 3.2 liter tank. Both versions used the same fuel cell. Stalker UAVs were used by Army and Marine Special Forces in Afghanistan to detect improvised explosive devices. Users haven't requested changes to the airframe, but have requested endurance changes, with aircraft being put in the air two to three times a day, every day. Several potential foreign sales were under negotiation, with customers and numbers of systems being undisclosed. Lockheed also revealed that they planned to continue testing the laser-charged Stalker. The laser apparatus, built by LaserMotive, was about the size of a horse trailer, and they were working to reduce its size to something that could be used for tactical operations. Ideal size was about the same as "two travel suitcases put together."

In 2018, the Rapid Reaction Technology Office, under the Office of the Secretary of Defense, funded the development at ARL of a 350 W SOFC system to replace the 245 W system in order to increase the power, mission duration, and reliability for future unmanned aerial systems (UASs). These developments were expected to provide new capabilities for small UASs and also soldier-portable power applications. They could also be applied to unmanned ground vehicle systems. A higher powered fuel cell stack was expected to benefit missions in adverse conditions including high wind or high altitude, while also simplifying take-offs and accommodating larger payloads.

The 350 W prototypes, manufactured by the Adaptive Energy LLC headquartered in Ann Arbor, MI. , were designed to provide 40% more power while packaged in the same physical power system (size, weight, shape) as the 245 W system. Researchers at ARL evaluated two 350 W systems; one for its thermal cycling capability, and the other for long term operation performance. It was shown that the first system displayed 55 thermal cycles without experiencing performance decay and the second system demonstrated continuous operation for 2,000 hours. Limitations of these systems included fractures of the electrolyte, made of thin ceramic material, and carbon deposition within the fuel cell. Further development of the technology resulted in a commercial product.

== Specifications (Stalker) ==
Data from

General characteristics

- Crew: none
- Wingspan: 10 ft (3.0 m)
- Empty weight: 14.5 lb (7 kg)
- Max takeoff weight: 17.5 lb (8 kg)
- Powerplant: 1 × Hush Drive Electric
- Propellers: 2-bladed

Performance

- Maximum speed: 50 mph (80 km/h, 43 kn) (dash)
- Endurance: 2 hours
- Service ceiling: 15,000 ft (4,600 m)
