= Jerome Pearson =

American space scientist and engineer

Jerome Pearson (19 April 1938 – 27 Jan 2021) was an American engineer and space scientist best known for his work on space elevators, including a lunar space elevator. He was president of STAR, Inc., and has developed aircraft and spacecraft technology for the United States Air Force, DARPA, and NASA. He held several patents and was the author of nearly 100 publications in aircraft, spacecraft, electrodynamic tethers, SETI, and global climate control.

== Biography ==
Pearson received his bachelor's degree in engineering from Washington University in St. Louis in 1961, and his master's degree in geology from Wright State University in Dayton, Ohio, in 1977. After serving in the U.S. Marine Corps, he became an aerospace engineer for the NASA Langley and Ames research centers during the Apollo Program. He joined the Air Force Research Laboratory (AFRL) in 1971, and developed vibration control for high-power lasers and a kinetic-kill vehicle concept for President Reagan's Strategic Defense Initiative in the 1980s. As Chief of the AFRL Structural Dynamics Branch, he led the development of the high-temperature acoustics test facility at Wright-Patterson AFB in Ohio, which was used for high-speed missile testing and the National Aerospace Plane development. In the 1980s he consulted for Walt Disney World in Florida, and consulted on the CommuniCore Pavilion. In 1998 he founded Star Technology and Research, Inc., a small business in Mount Pleasant, SC, for aerospace research and development, and currently serves as its president.

Pearson is an Associate Fellow of the AIAA, a Fellow of the British Interplanetary Society, and a Tau Beta Pi "Eminent Engineer". As President of STAR, Inc., he received the U.S. Small Business Administration National Tibbetts Award in 2001. Sponsored by Sir Arthur C. Clarke, he was elected Member of the International Academy of Astronautics in 2002.

== Selected publications ==
Pearson was an early co-inventor of the space elevator. His publication in Acta Astronautica in 1975 introduced the concept to the world spaceflight community.

Arthur C. Clarke then contacted Pearson for the technical background of his novel, "The Fountains of Paradise", published in 1978, and acknowledged this contribution in the Afterword. Shortly thereafter, Pearson invented the lunar space elevator, balanced about the Lagrangian points in the Moon-Earth system, and extended the concept on a contract with the NASA Institute for Advanced Concepts.

He then applied rotating tethers for mining asteroids, proposed a rotating space tether plus a rocket or gun for Earth-to-space launches, and tethers for orbit propellantless maneuvering space vehicles.

Pearson wrote invited articles on space elevators and tethers for Encyclopædia Britannica and New Scientist, was featured discussing space elevators in the Discovery Channel series "Science of the Impossible", and proposed the rarity of Earth-like planets as an explanation for the lack of success of SETI.

Pearson developed a space-based solar shield to counteract global warming and control Earth's climate, and multi-winglets for improved aircraft performance.

Pearson has also written about the origins of the concept of the space elevator, and how it has been mistakenly attributed to Konstantin Tsiolkovsky.
