= Space elevator safety =

There are risks associated with never-done-before technologies like the construction and operation of a space elevator. A space elevator would present a navigational hazard, both to aircraft and spacecraft. Aircraft could be dealt with by means of simple air-traffic control restrictions. Impacts by space objects such as meteoroids, satellites and micrometeorites pose a more difficult problem for construction and operation of a space elevator.

== Satellites ==
If nothing were done, essentially all satellites with perigees below the top of the elevator would eventually collide with the elevator cable.

== Failure cascade ==
For stability, it is not enough that other fibers be able to take over the load of a failed strand — the system must also survive the immediate, dynamical effects of fiber failure, which generates projectiles aimed at the cable itself. For example, if the cable has a working stress of 50 gigapascals (7,300,000 psi) and a Young's modulus of 1,000 gigapascals (150,000,000 psi), its strain will be 0.05 and its stored elastic energy will be 1/2 × 0.05 × 50 GPa = 1.25 billion joules per cubic meter. Breaking a fiber will result in a pair of de-tensioning waves moving apart at the speed of sound in the fiber, with the fiber segments behind each wave moving at over 1,000 metres per second (3,300 ft/s) (more than the muzzle velocity of a 5.56 mm round fired from an M16 rifle). Unless these fast-moving projectiles can be stopped safely, they will break yet other fibers, initiating a failure cascade capable of severing the cable. The challenge of preventing fiber breakage from initiating a catastrophic failure cascade seems to be unaddressed in the current literature on terrestrial space elevators. Problems of this sort would be easier to solve in lower-tension applications (e.g., lunar elevators). This problem has been described by physicist Freeman Dyson.

== Corrosion ==
Corrosion is thought by some to be a risk to any thinly built tether (which most designs call for). In the upper atmosphere, atomic oxygen steadily eats away at most materials.

Other analyses show atomic oxygen to be a non-problem in practice.

== Radiation and Van Allen belts ==
Most of the space elevator structure would lie inside the Van Allen radiation belt, and the space elevator would run through the Van Allen belts. This is not a problem for most freight, but the amount of time a climber spends in this region would cause radiation poisoning to any unshielded human or other living things. The inner belt would have to be crossed, where—behind a shield of three millimetres (0.12 in) of aluminium—the dose rate can reach 465 mSv/h.

Furthermore, the effectiveness of the magnetosphere to deflect radiation emanating from the sun decreases dramatically after rising several earth radii above the surface. This ionising radiation may cause damage to materials within both the tether and climbers.

For a space elevator to be used by human passengers, the Van Allen radiation belt must therefore be emptied of its charged particles. This has been proposed by the High Voltage Orbiting Long Tether project.

== In the event of failure ==
=== Cut near the anchor point ===
If the elevator is cut at its anchor point on Earth's surface, the outward force exerted by the counterweight would cause the entire elevator to rise upward into a higher orbit, or escape Earth's gravity altogether.

=== Cut up to about 25,000 km ===
If the break occurred at higher altitude, up to about 25,000 kilometres (16,000 mi), the lower portion of the elevator would descend to Earth and drape itself along the equator east of the anchor point, while the now unbalanced upper portion would rise to a higher orbit.

=== Cut above 25,000 km ===
If the break occurred at the counterweight side of the elevator, the lower portion, now including the "central station" of the elevator, would begin to fall down and would continue down to reentry if no part of the cable below failed as well. Depending on the size, it would either burn up on re-entry or impact the surface. A mechanism to immediately sever the cable below the station would prevent reentry of the station and result in its continuation in a high and slightly modified orbit. Simulations have shown that as the descending portion of the space elevator "wraps around" Earth, the stress on the remaining length of cable increases, resulting in its upper sections breaking off and being flung away. The details of how these pieces break and the trajectories they take are highly sensitive to initial conditions.

== See also ==
- Lunar space elevator – Proposed transportation system
- Non-rocket spacelaunch – Concepts for launch into space
- Space elevator construction
- Space elevator economics – Transportation system cost comparison
- Space elevators in fiction
