= Powerlight Technologies =

American engineering company

PowerLight Technologies
- Company type: Engineering
- Genre: Lasers
- Predecessor: LaserMotive
- Founded: 1 January 2007
- Founder: Tom Nugent and Jordin Kare
- Headquarters: Kent, Washington
- Website: powerlighttech.com

PowerLight Technologies is an American engineering firm providing power transmission via lasers. Its primary products are power-over-fiber which transmits energy in the form of laser light through an optic fiber, and "laser power beaming" in which the laser energy is transmitted through free space.

== History ==
Logo of LaserMotive used until the company changed its name in 2017

The predecessor to PowerLight Technologies, LaserMotive, was founded in 2006 by physicists Tom Nugent and Jordin Kare. The company's initial goal was to win the NASA Centennial Challenges Power Beam challenge. After winning the challenge, LaserMotive focused on developing the power beaming technology for commercial application on UAVs and successfully demonstrated the transfer of 400 watts of power over 1 kilometer.

In 2017, LaserMotive changed its name to PowerLight Technologies, hired three new advisors, and officially announced the launch of commercial applications for its power-over-fiber technology. The company's new CEO Richard Gustoffson described this new focus on power-over-fiber as a "major transformation" for the company. PowerLight also continues to work toward commercial application of its technology to free-space power transmission.

== Technology ==
The power beaming system uses a laser running from a power supply. To define the beam size at its destination, the laser's light can be shaped by a set of optics. This light energy can be sent through air or the vacuum of space, onto a photovoltaic (PV) receiver, where it is converted back into electricity.

In addition to delivering energy through air or space, PowerLight adapted the technology to deliver electricity through an optical fiber. By transmitting a focused laser light through optical fiber to a solar cell-like receiver, this technology allows for power to be provided over hundreds of meters in environments where electric transmission by copper wire is not optimal, either due to the higher weight of wire compared to glass fiber, or due to operational constraints imposed by electromagnetic fields generated by electrical transmission by wire. Uses include ground, air, and underwater applications.

The electrical-to-optical conversion efficiency of modern laser technology can be as high as 85%, and off-the-shelf semiconductor diode lasers can have an output efficiency of around 50%. The optical-to-electrical conversion efficiency of a photovoltaic receiver can be over 50% for monochromatic (or laser) light.

== Applications ==
PowerLight Technologies has investigated numerous applications for its laser power beaming technology, including transmission of power both to and from the ground, spacecraft, aerial vehicles, satellites, and a lunar rover.

=== Tether propulsion ===
The company's stated first goal was to win the Beam Power Challenge, part of the Space Elevator Games, to power a small climber up a vertical tether. They partnered with The Boeing Company, which provided them with test facilities, as well as specialized solar cells. In 2007, they failed to qualify for the Challenge due to difficulties meeting NASA's specifications.

At the 2009 Challenge, on November 6, 2009, LaserMotive successfully used lasers to drive a 4.8 kg (11 lb) device up a 900 m (2,950 ft) cable suspended from a helicopter. Energy is transmitted to the climber using a high-power infrared beam. LaserMotive's entry, which was the only one to top the cable, reached an average speed of 13 km/h (8.1 mph) and earned a $900,000 prize. This marked both a performance record, and the first award of a cash prize at the Challenge.

=== Aircraft propulsion ===
On October 28, 2010, PowerLight set a flight endurance record at the Future of Flight Center by powering a quadcopter UAV for more than 12 hours using infrared semiconductor diode lasers to power a small photovoltaic array. The vehicle was equipped with a small on-board battery capable of only a few minutes of flight.

On August 7, 2012, PowerLight equipped a Lockheed Martin Stalker UAS with a laser receiver, and the system was successfully demonstrated during day and night operations in the desert. This series of demonstration flights is described as "the first-ever outdoor flight of a UAS powered by laser".

== See also ==
- Beam-powered propulsion
- Elevator:2010
- Wireless power
