= Peter K. Homer =

American aerospace engineer (born 1961)

Peter K. Homer (born 1961) is an American aerospace engineer from Southwest Harbor, Maine. He won $200,000 from NASA for his entry in the Astronaut Glove Challenge. The competition was held on Thursday, May 3, 2007, with a total of five teams competing (two of which dropped out prior the commencement of the competition), and was one of NASA's seven Centennial Challenges. The gloves were rated on strength, flexibility and comfort. Homer's glove design performed better overall than the competition and NASA hopes it will help improve future astronaut gloves. He was unemployed at the time of his victory.

In 2009, Peter K. Homer once again won the Astronaut Glove Challenge. Differing from the previous competition, the 2009 version of the glove was required to have a thermal micrometeorite garment, which is the outermost layer of the astronaut's glove.

When performing a space walk, NASA astronauts use their hands as their primary way to move around and complete tasks. After many hours of working inside the pressurized gloves, the force required by the astronauts to move their fingers and wrists back and forth repeatedly often results in blisters, abrasions and damaged fingernails. New technologies would reduce discomfort and make the astronauts' jobs easier and safer.

Of his space-glove know-how, Homer said: "I had to make it up, because there is no book you can buy about this. There is no pattern".

Homer helped develop the Space X space suit and was also hired by Los Angeles-based Orbital Outfitters, which intended to put his engineering and sewing skills to work on a pressurized space suit for suborbital space flyers.

As of 2025 he is working with the University of Arizona to test his full pressure suit's capabilities.

== Education ==
Peter maintains an undergraduate mechanical engineering degree from Rensselaer Polytechnic Institute and an M.S. in aeronautical and astronautical engineering-advanced composite structures from Stanford University.
