= Space elevator competitions =

A space elevator is a theoretical system using a super-strong ribbon going from the surface of the Earth to a point beyond Geosynchronous orbit. The center of gravity of the ribbon would be exactly in geosynchronous orbit, so that the ribbon would always stay above the anchor point. Vehicles would climb the ribbon powered by a beam of energy projected from the surface of the Earth. Building a space elevator requires materials and techniques that do not currently exist. A variety of Space Elevator competitions have been held in order to stimulate the development of such materials and techniques.

Space elevators were first conceived in 1895, but until the discovery of carbon nanotubes, no technology was envisioned that could make them possible. Building an actual elevator is still out of reach, but the directions for research are clear. This makes the area ripe for incentive prizes like the X Prize, and prizes and competitions have been set up since 2005 to encourage the development of relevant technologies. There are two main areas of research remaining, and these are where the competitions focus: building cables ("a Tether challenge"), and climbing and descending cables ("a Power Beam challenge").

In a Power Beam Challenge, each team designs and builds a climber (a machine capable of traveling up and down a tether ribbon). In a Tether challenge, each team attempts to build the longest and strongest cable. In the Power Beam challenge climber carry a payload. Power is beamed from a transmitter to a receiver on the climber. With each competition, the tethers reach higher altitudes, and the climbers are expected to climb further. Each competition can have minimum lengths and maximum weight per meter for cables, and minimum speed and distance goals for climbers.

== Space elevator challenge results ==
Like many competitions modeled after the X prize, competitors have to meet a minimum baseline, and then prizes are awarded to the best entry that exceed that target. In 2005, there was only a climbing challenge, and none of the entrants met the minimum speed requirement of 1 m/s. Starting in 2006, Elevator:2010, sponsored by spaceward.org and NASA conducted a series of competitions. For 2006, the prize was increased, and the speed requirement dropped slightly to 50 meters in under a minute. 13 teams entered, and one was able to climb the 50 meters in 58 seconds. In 2009 at Edwards Air Force Base, the challenge was climbing a 900 m tether, and one entry managed the feat several times, with a top speed of 3.5 m/s. NASA didn't renew their sponsorship after 2009, pending "further advancements in material science".

The International Space Elevator Consortium was formed in 2008, and has held annual conferences. They announced a $10,000 Strong Tether Challenge competition for 2013. The Challenge was canceled for lack of competitors. The 2011, 2012, and 2013 ISEC conferences also featured FIRST-style High School robotics competitions for climbers. and occasional competitions.

The Japan Space Elevator Association held a climbing competition in August 2013. Hot air balloons were used to hoist a tether, and Team Okusawa's entry succeeded in climbing to 1100 meters, and a team from Nihon University reached 1200 meters. (The sources are in Japanese.)

The Japan Space Elevator Association held a climbing competition in August 2014. Hot air balloons were used to hoist both rope (11 mm) and ribbon (35 mm x 2 mm) to 200 m and 1200 m. Team Okusawa climbed to 1200 m and descended twice. Kanagawa University carried a 100 kg payload to 123 m on the 200 m ribbon. Kanagawa University's three teams climbed respectively to 1200 m (rope), 1150 m (rope) and 1100 m (ribbon). Technical University of Munich reached 1000 m (rope).

| Competition | Type | Prize | Target | Date | Location | Entries | Winner? | Records | Comments |
|---|---|---|---|---|---|---|---|---|---|
| X Prize Cup | Climber | | | Aug 2005 | NASA AMES, Mtn Vw, CA, USA | | no | | |
| X Prize Cup | Tether | | | Aug 2005 | NASA AMES, Mtn Vw, CA, USA | | no | Centaurus: 1300 Lbs (2 gr, 2 m) | |
| 2nd Annual X Prize Cup | Climber | $200K | 50 m, 1 m/s (climb + descend) | Oct 2006 | Las Cruces, NM, USA | 6 (USST, LiteWon, TurboCrawler, Climber 1, KC Space Pirates, Snowstar) | no | USST: 1 m/s climbing | 10 cm ribbon, searchlights for power |
| 2nd Annual X Prize Cup | Lander | ??? | take off, hover, land | Oct 2006 | Las Cruces, NM, USA | none | no | | |
| 2nd Annual X Prize Cup | Tether | $200K | Max Strength (min len 2 m, max wt 2 g) | Oct 2006 | Las Cruces, NM, USA | 4 (UBC, Astroaraneae, Centaurus Aerospace, Bryan Laubscher) | no | Astroaraneae: 1335 Lbs (2 gr, 2m) | |
| Space Elevator Games | Climber | $500K | 100 m, 2 m/s | Oct 2007 | Salt Lake City, UT, USA | (USST, KC Space Pirates, LaserMotive) | no | USST: First laser powered climb; 1.8 m/s climbing | First lasers for power |
| Space Elevator Games | Tether | $500K | | Oct 2007 | Salt Lake City, UT, USA | Astroaraneae, Delta x (MIT) | no | Astroaraneae: ??? | |
| 2009 Space Elevator Challenge | Climber | $1.1M 5 m/s $.9M 2 m/s | 900 m, 5 m/s or 2 m/s | Oct 2009 | NASA Dryden FRC, Edwards Air Force Base, California, U.S. | 6 (USST, KC Space Pirates, LaserMotive, Umich, McGill, NSS) | yes | LaserMotive won 900K for their climber, which reached speeds of 3.6 m/s | |
| 2009 Space Elevator Challenge | Tether | $2 M | | Oct 2009 | NASA Dryden FRC, Edwards Air Force Base, California, U.S. | | no | | First carbon nanotube |
| JSETEC 2010 | Climber | | 300 m | Aug 2010 | Mt. Fuji, Shizuoka-ken, Japan | 15 teams (USST, Kanagawa U., Nihon U., Shizuoka U.) | yes | Kanagawa University was top finisher; USST reached 18.3 m/s (battery-powered) before crashing | |
| 2011 Strong Tether Centennial Challenge | Tether | | 5 MYuris | 12 August 2011 | Redmond, WA, USA | | no | | |
| JSETEC 2011 | Climber | | | Aug 2011 | Mt. Fuji, Shizuoka-ken, Japan | 16 | | 530 m in 39 s, 450 m in 27 s | |
| EUSPEC 2011 | Climber | | 25 m | Aug 2011 | Technical University of Munich, Germany | 6 | yes | Efficiency: 43.85% | Either rope or belt tethers |
| JSETEC 2012 | Climber | | 1200 m | Aug 2012 | Mt. Fuji, Shizuoka-ken, Japan | 16 | no | No one climbed 1200 m | Either rope or belt tethers |
| EUSPEC 2012 | Climber | | 50 m | Oct 2012 | TU Munich, Germany | 6 | yes | | Either rope or belt tethers |
| JSEA 2013 | Climber | | 1200 m | Aug 2013 | Mt. Fuji, Shizuoka-ken, Japan | Okusawa, Nihon U | | 1200 m | |
| TechnoBrain 2014 | Climber | 10,000 NIS | 25 m | June 2014 | Technion, Israel | Ishai Zimerman and Ronen Atzil | yes | | Yuri Artsutanov, who developed the concept of the "space elevator", was the guest of honor and one of the judges of the competition |
| SPEC 2014 | Climber | | 1200 m and 200 m | August 2014 | Japan | Team Keio & Manten Project, Team Okuzawa, Kanagawa University Egami Ken, Technical University of Munich | no | Team Okusawa climbed two round trips to 1200 m; Kanagawa University climbed 123 m on the 200 m rope with a 100 kg payload | Both rope (11 mm) and ribbons (35 mm x 2 mm) were available at each altitude, held aloft by balloons. |
| EUSPEC 2016 | Climber | | 100 m and 50 m | September 2016 | Germany | Aoki Lab (Nihon University); Last.minute (TUM); Space Group Hof (Schiller Gymnasium); Meier's Eleven (Gutenbergschule Wiesbaden); | | | Both rope (10 mm) and belt (30–40 mm x 2 mm) were available, held aloft by balloons. |
| BASPEC 2019 | Climber | | 20 m | September 2019 | Germany, Hof a.d. Saale | Chip-Chap; Insert Name; Schiller-Space Blocks; SGH-Space Team; Sky Runner; Vierstein | yes | | |
| EUSPEC 2024 | Climber | | 85 m | April 2024 | Technical University of Munich, Germany | Space Robotics, Alpha Centauri, Inoue Lab Team, Meier's 11 | yes | | An 85 m belt was suspended from a crane. Meier's 11 won in the beginner's level. Inoue Lab received an award |
