= Keith Mansfield (writer) =

English writer and publisher

- Born: 1965 (age 60–61); Scunthorpe
- Occupations: Novelist, publisher
- Writing career
- Genres: Popular fiction, children's fiction, Science fiction, Young adult fiction
- Notable works: Johnny Mackintosh and the Spirit of London, Johnny Mackintosh: Star Blaze, Johnny Mackintosh: Battle for Earth
- Website: www.keithmansfield.co.uk

Keith Mansfield (born 1965) is an English writer and publisher. He is the author of the Johnny Mackintosh series of novels, has scripted and advised on several television programmes, including It's Not Rocket Science for the UK network ITV. He was formerly a book editor at Pergamon Press (when it was controlled by Robert Maxwell) where he was responsible for science encyclopedias mainly intended for post-graduates and then worked at Oxford University Press (OUP). After a period working on computer science books for Addison-Wesley (now part of Pearson), he returned to OUP as a commissioning editor of science books.

His first novel, Johnny Mackintosh and the Spirit of London, was long-listed for the New Horizons Book Award 2010 and shortlisted for the Concorde Book Award 2011. As a publisher at OUP, he signed Nick Bostrom for Bostrom's book Superintelligence: Paths, Dangers, Strategies on the dangers and opportunities of artificial intelligence and Robin Hanson's book on a future society dominated by the products of brain emulation, The Age of Em.

Born in Scunthorpe, England and schooled in Nottingham (Nottingham High School and West Bridgford School), he studied mathematics and physics at Trinity College, Cambridge, Mansfield's work is known for the way it weaves scientific ideas and concepts into the general narrative. Mansfield lives in Spitalfields, London and is the recipient of a Hawthornden Fellowship. His novels have been translated into Dutch and Norwegian.

== Bibliography ==
- Johnny Mackintosh and the Spirit of London (Quercus, 2008)
- Johnny Mackintosh: Star Blaze (Quercus, 2010)
- Johnny Mackintosh: Battle for Earth (Quercus, 2011)
- The Future in Minutes (Quercus, 2019)
