= Mars Microspacecraft Missions =

Mars Microspacecraft Missions are proposed cheap launch missions costing less than $50 million that can be carried out by the Italian Space Agency to Mars to research Mars, ranging from the use of one spacecraft to multiple constellations of mini spacecraft.

Under a study contract, the Italian Space Agency (ASI) developed the mechanical system concept for a Mars Microspacecraft to launch in a twin configuration on an Ariane V ASAP (Auxiliary Payload). As a member a multi-disciplined team, ASI developed the mechanical configuration and preliminary structure design for the spacecraft in two configurations, a probe carrier and an orbiter. The term microspacecraft was used in a Jet Propulsion Laboratory publication in 1981.
