= LiftPort Group =

American space company

- Industry: Space, Space Commercialization, Cheap Reliable Access to Space
- Genre: Science, Advancement in Space Travel, Space, Space Elevator
- Founder: Michael J. Laine
- Headquarters: Snohomish, Washington, USA
- Key people: Michael J. Laine
- Products: Space Elevator themed Coffee Cups, Wall Posters, etc.
- Website: http://www.liftport.com

LiftPort Group is a privately held Washington state corporation. It was founded in April 2003 by Michael J. Laine. The company is focused on the construction of a space elevator using carbon nanotubes.

== History ==
- April 2003, LiftPort Group founded.
- April 12, 2004, LiftPort Group cosponsored the Official Yuri's Night celebration in Seattle, Washington.
- November 12, 2004, Demonstrated a lifter at the Massachusetts Institute of Technology by having it climb up a ribbon approximately 90 meters tall, during a snowstorm.
- April 29, 2005 Announced plans for a carbon nanotube manufacturing plant, the company's first formal facility for production of the material on a commercial scale. The new facility was to serve as the regional headquarters for the company, and represent the fruition of LiftPort Group's three years of research and development efforts into carbon nanotubes, including partnering work with a variety of leading research institutions in the business and academic communities. Set to open in June 2005, LiftPort Nanotech was to be located in Millville, New Jersey.
- September 20, 2005, LiftPort Group designed and built a longer ribbon (called Tether) and load bearing balloon to further illustrate proof of concept and progress. The lifter climbed the 1,000-foot (300 m) ribbon which was suspended from the balloon.
- January 2006 LiftPort successfully launched an observation and communication platform a mile in the air and maintained it in a stationary position for more than six hours while robotic lifters climbed up and down a ribbon attached to the platform. The platform, a proprietary system that the company has named "HALE" (High Altitude Long Endurance), was secured in place by an arrangement of high altitude balloons, which were also used to launch it. The robotic lifters measured five feet, six inches (1.7 meters) and climbed to a height of more than 1,500 feet (460 m), surpassing its last test record by more than 500 feet (150 m).
- June 11, 2007, LiftPort was to be penalized due to an alleged illegal offering of shares of the company.
- February 16, 2010, LiftPort Group entered into a Consent settlement with the State of Washington agreeing to cease and desist specified activities, and no fine was imposed.

== Lunar space elevator ==
In October 2011 on the LiftPort website Laine announced that LiftPort is pursuing a Lunar space elevator as an interim goal before attempting a terrestrial elevator. At the 2011 Annual Meeting of the Lunar Exploration Analysis Group (LEAG), LiftPort CTO Marshall Eubanks presented a paper on the Lunar Elevator co-authored by Michael Laine.

In August 2012, LiftPort announced the launch of KickStarter funding for their Lunar space elevator. This KickStarter fund can be found at Space Elevator Kickstarter. This project successfully exceeded its funding goal on September 13, 2012, requesting $8,000. It raised $110,353 from 3,468 backers.

The KickStarter project comments thread has many comments from backers asking what has happened with no response.

== Bibliography ==
- LiftPort - The Space Elevator: Opening Space to Everyone, ISBN 978-1-59222-109-7
