= Johnny Mackintosh =

Fictional character in the books of Keith Mansfield

Johnny Mackintosh is the fictional hero of a series of books by English novelist Keith Mansfield, published by Quercus Books.

The first title in the series, Johnny Mackintosh and the Spirit of London, opens on his thirteenth birthday and finds Johnny living in Halader House, a children’s home in the fictional town of Castle Dudbury, Essex, England.

Johnny is portrayed as having blond hair, green eyes (inlaid with silver flecks) and pale skin, unblemished apart from a pattern of five freckles on the inside of his left arm in the shape of the constellation Cassiopeia (his "Starmark"). He is sporty, and plays in the centre of midfield for his school football (soccer) team. Also, he is good at computer science and has written an operating system called Keyboard- Or Voice-Activated Computer which leads to the creation of a computer called Kovac who can speak and understand oral commands.

Johnny had an older brother, Nicky (apparently murdered when Johnny was two years old) and a younger sister, Clara, of whose existence he is unaware as Johnny Mackintosh and the Spirit of London begins. His parents are father Michael Mackintosh, imprisoned for Nicky’s murder, and Mary Mackintosh, also found guilty of Nicky’s murder and placed in the fictional St Catharine’s Hospital for the Criminally Insane.

When Kovac detects an extraterrestrial signal, Johnny begins his adventures, taking him away from Earth on a journey through time and space

== The Spirit of London ==
On visits to London, Johnny has seen and come to love the skyscraper sited at 30 St Mary Axe known as the London Gherkin. A time comes when he must decide upon the form for his own spaceship, so he bases this upon the Gherkin. The name of the vessel, chosen by the ship herself, is the Spirit of London. It is most likely both a tribute to Charles Lindbergh’s Spirit of St. Louis and an acknowledgement of the iconic status the Gherkin has gained as a symbol that represents the city of London.
