= Bradley C. Edwards =

US physicist

- Education: University of Wisconsin–Madison

Bradley C. Edwards is an American physicist who has been involved in the development of the space elevator concept.

== Biography ==
Edwards received his PhD degree in Physics from the University of Wisconsin–Madison in 1990. His thesis work was in astrophysics on the soft x-ray background. During his graduate work, he worked on x-ray micro calorimeters and several sounding rocket and Shuttle payloads.

After receiving his PhD, Edwards was hired as a staff scientist at Los Alamos National Laboratory where he was co-investigator on the ALEXIS satellite, developed superconducting tunnel junction detectors, a lunar orbiter, a Mars mission, a Europa orbiter and the world's first optical cryocooler. In 1998, Edwards began working on the space elevator concept.

Edwards received funding from the NASA Institute for Advanced Concepts to examine the idea and published two papers in 2000 and 2003. He proposed methods for deploying a space elevator and overcoming perceived obstacles such as orbital debris, anchoring, climber design, and power delivery and examined construction costs and scheduling, laying the groundwork for current discussions.

Edwards also published two books on the subject, The Space Elevator: A Revolutionary Earth-to-Space Transportation in 2003 and Leaving the Planet by Space Elevator in 2006 which gained coverage on major news media.

In interviews, Edwards has estimated that price per pound of launching into low Earth orbit could be reduced to 100th the cost of Shuttle missions.

Edwards spent eleven years working at the Los Alamos National Laboratory in New Mexico, researching advanced space technologies. He attempted a number of ventures associated with the space elevator concept and spent six years as a senior engineer at Sea-Bird Electronics, an oceanographic company. In 2007 he started a new company to develop carbon nanotube technology.

== Books ==
- The Space Elevator: A Revolutionary Earth-to-Space Transportation System, by Bradley C. Edwards and Eric A. Westling (November 2003)
- Leaving the Planet by Space Elevator, by Bradley C. Edwards and Philip Ragan (October 2006)
