= Johnny Mackintosh and the Spirit of London =

2008 novel by Keith Mansfield

- Author: Keith Mansfield
- Language: English
- Series: The Terran Scenario
- Genre: Children's fiction (9-14), Young adult fiction, Science fiction
- Publisher: Quercus
- Publication date: 3 July 2008
- Publication place: United Kingdom
- Media type: Print (hardback & paperback)
- Pages: 346
- ISBN: 1-84724-444-0 (hbk) & 1847247741 (pbk)
- Followed by: Johnny Mackintosh: Star Blaze

Johnny Mackintosh and the Spirit of London is the first novel in a series of young adult books written by Keith Mansfield and published by Quercus. The book opens on the thirteenth birthday of the title character and is written entirely from Johnny Mackintosh's point of view.

== Plot summary ==
Set in the early 21st century, the book opens with Johnny Mackintosh living in a children's home (Ben Halader House) located in the fictional Castle Dudbury New Town in the county of Essex, United Kingdom. He has written a SETI-style program for the children's home's computers and, at the beginning of the book, an alien signal is detected. As the book develops Johnny Mackintosh is abducted by aliens and travels to the centre of the Galaxy, before returning to Earth, but in the distant past. He witnesses the extinction of the dinosaurs and the destruction of Atlantis, before returning to the present day and discovering the truth about his parents. The Spirit of London of the title is the name of the spaceship acquired by Johnny Mackintosh during the course of the book. From the outside it appears identical to the skyscraper situated at 30 St Mary Axe in London, known as 'the Gherkin'.

== Publishing history ==
The English-language edition was published in hardcover in July 2008 and in paperback in January 2009. The Dutch edition, Johnny Mackintosh en de Supersnelle Augurk was published by Prometheus in June 2008 while the Norwegian edition, Johnny Mackintosh på galaktisk eventyr was published by Cappelen Damm in September 2009.

== Prizes and awards ==
- New Horizons Book Award 2010 (longlisted)
- Concorde Book Award 2011 (shortlisted)
