= Lunar space elevator =

Proposed transportation system

Diagram showing equatorial and polar Lunar space elevators running past L_{1}. An L_{2} elevator would mirror this arrangement on the Lunar far side, and cargo dropped from its end would be flung outward into the Solar System.

A lunar space elevator or lunar spacelift is a proposed transportation system for moving a mechanical climbing vehicle up and down a ribbon-shaped tethered cable that is set between the surface of the Moon "at the bottom" and a docking port suspended tens of thousands of kilometers above in space at the top.

It is similar in concept to the better known Earth-based space elevator idea, but since the Moon's surface gravity is much lower than the Earth's, the engineering requirements for constructing a lunar elevator system can be met using materials and technology already available. For a lunar elevator, the cable or tether extends considerably farther out from the lunar surface into space than one that would be used in an Earth-based system. However, the main function of a space elevator system is the same in either case; both allow for a reusable, controlled means of transporting payloads of cargo, or possibly people, between a base station at the bottom of a gravity well and a docking port in outer space.

A lunar elevator could significantly reduce the costs and improve reliability of soft-landing equipment on the lunar surface. For example, it would permit the use of mass-efficient (high specific impulse), low thrust drives such as ion drives which otherwise cannot land on the Moon. Since the docking port would be connected to the cable in a microgravity environment, these and other drives can reach the cable from low Earth orbit (LEO) with minimal launched fuel from Earth. With conventional rockets, the fuel needed to reach the lunar surface from LEO is many times the landed mass, thus the elevator can reduce launch costs for payloads bound for the lunar surface by a similar factor.

== Location ==
There are two points in space where an elevator's docking port could maintain a stable, lunar-synchronous position: the Earth-Moon Lagrange points L_{1} and L_{2}. The 0.055 eccentricity of the lunar orbit means that these points are not fixed relative to the lunar surface : the L_{1} is 56,315 km +/- 3,183 km away from the Earth-facing side of the Moon (at the lunar equator) and L_{2} is 62,851 km +/- 3,539 km from the center of the Moon's far side, in the opposite direction. At these points, the effect of the Moon's gravity and the effect of the centrifugal force resulting from the elevator system's synchronous, rigid body rotation cancel each other out. The Lagrangian points L_{1} and L_{2} are points of unstable gravitational equilibrium, meaning that small inertial adjustments will be needed to ensure any object positioned there can remain stationary relative to the lunar surface.

Both of these positions are substantially farther up (from the Moon) compared to the 36,000 km from Earth to geostationary orbit. Furthermore, the weight of the limb of the cable system extending down to the Moon would have to be balanced by the cable extending further up, and the Moon's slow rotation means the upper limb would have to be much longer than for an Earth-based system, or be topped by a much more massive counterweight. Suspending a kilogram of cable or payload just above the surface of the Moon in the direction of the L_{1} point would require 1,000 kg of mass as counterweight in an orbit 26,000 km closer to Earth as L_{1} is. (A smaller mass on a longer cable, e.g., 100 kg at a distance of 230,000 km — more than halfway to Earth — would have the same balancing effect.) Suspending a kilogram of cable or payload just above the surface of the Moon in the direction of the L_{2} point would require 1,000 kg at a distance of approximately 120,000 km from the Moon as counterbalance (more than 51 thousand kilometer further away from the Moon as the L_{2} point, almost 59 thousand km when the L_{2} point is closest to the Moon). These 1,000 kg would be in an orbit around Earth with the same orbital period as the Moon, yet its mean orbital radius would be almost one third larger as that of the Moon and the centripetal force to keep it in such an orbit would equal the weight of 1 kg at Moon's surface.

The anchor point of a space elevator is normally considered to be at the equator. However, there are several possible cases to be made for locating a lunar base at one of the Moon's poles; a base on a peak of eternal light could take advantage of near-continuous solar power, for example, or small quantities of water and other volatiles may be trapped in permanently shaded crater bottoms. A space elevator could be anchored near a lunar pole, though not directly at it. A tramway could be used to bring the cable the rest of the way to the pole, with the Moon's low gravity allowing much taller support towers and wider spans between them than would be possible on Earth.

== Fabrication ==
Because of the Moon's lower gravity and lack of atmosphere, a lunar elevator would have less stringent requirements for the tensile strength of the material making up its cable than an Earth-tethered cable. An Earth-based elevator would require high strength-to-weight materials that are theoretically possible, but not yet fabricated in practice (e.g., carbon nanotubes). A lunar elevator, however, could be constructed using commercially available mass-produced high-strength para-aramid fibres (such as Kevlar and M5) or ultra-high-molecular-weight polyethylene fibre.

Compared to an Earth space elevator, there would be fewer geographic and political restrictions on the location of the surface connection. The connection point of a lunar elevator would not necessarily have to be directly under its center of gravity, and could even be near the poles, where evidence suggests there might be frozen water in deep craters that never see sunlight; if so, this might be collected and converted into rocket fuel.

== Cross-section profile ==
Space elevator designs for Earth typically have a taper of the tether that provides a uniform stress profile rather than a uniform cross-section. Because the strength requirement of a lunar space elevator is much lower than that of an Earth space elevator, a uniform cross-section is possible for the lunar space elevator. The study done for NASA's Institute of Advanced Concepts states "Current composites have characteristic heights of a few hundred kilometers, which would require taper ratios of about 6 for Mars, 4 for the Moon, and about 6000 for the Earth. The mass of the Moon is small enough that a uniform cross-section lunar space elevator could be constructed, without any taper at all." A uniform cross-section could make it possible for a lunar space elevator to be built in a double-tether pulley configuration. This configuration would greatly simplify repairs of a space elevator compared to a tapered elevator configuration. However a pulley configuration would require a strut at the counterweight hundreds of kilometers long to separate the up-tether from the down-tether and keep them from tangling. A pulley configuration might also allow the system capacity to be gradually expanded by stitching new tether material on at the Lagrange point as the tether rotated.

== History ==
The idea of space elevators has been around since 1960 when Yuri Artsutanov wrote a Sunday supplement to Pravda on how to build such a structure and the utility of geosynchronous orbit. His article however, was not known in the West. Then in 1966, John Isaacs, a leader of a group of American Oceanographers at Scripps Institute, published an article in Science about the concept of using thin wires hanging from a geostationary satellite. In that concept, the wires were to be thin (thin wires/tethers are now understood to be more susceptible to micrometeoroid damage). Like Artsutanov, Isaacs’ article also was not well known to the aerospace community.

In 1972, James Cline submitted a paper to NASA describing a "mooncable" concept similar to a lunar elevator. NASA responded negatively to the idea citing technical risk and lack of funds.

In 1975, Jerome Pearson independently came up with the Space elevator concept and published it in Acta Astronautica. That made the aerospace community at large aware of the space elevator for the first time. His article inspired Sir Arthur Clarke to write the novel The Fountains of Paradise (published in 1979, almost simultaneously with Charles Sheffield's novel on the same topic, The Web Between the Worlds). In 1978 Pearson extended his theory to the moon and changed to using the Lagrangian points instead of having it in geostationary orbit.

In 1977, some papers of Soviet space pioneer Friedrich Zander were posthumously published, revealing that he conceived of a lunar space tower in 1910.

In 2005 Jerome Pearson completed a study for NASA Institute of Advanced Concepts which showed the concept is technically feasible within the prevailing state of the art using existing commercially available materials.

In October 2011 on the LiftPort website Michael Laine announced that LiftPort is pursuing a Lunar space elevator as an interim goal before attempting a terrestrial elevator. At the 2011 Annual Meeting of the Lunar Exploration Analysis Group (LEAG), LiftPort CTO Marshall Eubanks presented a paper on the prototype Lunar Elevator co-authored by Laine. In August 2012, Liftport announced that the project could actually start near 2020. In April 2019, LiftPort CEO Michael Laine reported no progress beyond the lunar elevator company's conceptualized design.

== Materials ==
Unlike earth-anchored space elevators, the materials for lunar space elevators will not require a lot of strength. Lunar elevators can be made with materials available today. Carbon nanotubes aren’t required to build the structure. This would make it possible to build the elevator much sooner, since available carbon nanotube materials in sufficient quantities are still years away.

One material that has great potential is M5 fiber. This is a synthetic fiber that is lighter than Kevlar or Spectra. According to Pearson, Levin, Oldson, and Wykes in their article The Lunar Space Elevator, an M5 ribbon 30 mm wide and 0.023 mm thick, would be able to support 2000 kg on the lunar surface (2005). It would also be able to hold 100 cargo vehicles, each with a mass of 580 kg, evenly spaced along the length of the elevator. Other materials that could be used are T1000G carbon fiber, Spectra 200, Dyneema (used on the YES2 spacecraft), or Zylon. All of these materials have breaking lengths of several hundred kilometers under 1g.

Potential lunar elevator materials
Material	Density ρ kg/m^{3}	Stress Limit σ GPa	Breaking height (h = σ/ρg, km)
Single-wall carbon nanotubes (laboratory measurements)	2266	50	2200
Toray Carbon fiber (T1000G)	1810	6.4	361
Aramid, Ltd. polybenzoxazole fiber (Zylon PBO)	1560	5.8	379
Honeywell extended chain polyethylene fiber (Spectra 2000)	970	3.0	316
Magellan honeycomb polymer M5 (with planned values)	1700	5.7(9.5)	342(570)
DuPont Aramid fiber (Kevlar 49)	1440	3.6	255
Glass fibre (Ref Specific strength)	2600	3.4	133

The materials will be used to manufacture the ribbon-shaped, tethered cable which will connect from the L_{1} or L_{2} balance points to the surface of the moon. The climbing vehicles which will travel the length of these cables in a finished elevator system will not move very fast, thus simplifying some of the challenges of transferring cargo and maintaining structural integrity of the system. However, any small objects suspended in space for extended periods of time, like the tethered cables would be, are vulnerable to damage by micrometeoroids, so one possible method of improving their survivability would be to design a "multi-ribbon" system instead of just a single-tethered cable. Such a system would have interconnections at regular intervals, so that if one section of ribbon is damaged, parallel sections could carry the load until robotic vehicles could arrive to replace the severed ribbon. The interconnections would be spaced about 100 km apart, which is small enough to allow a robotic climber to carry the mass of the replacement 100 km of ribbon.

== Climbing vehicles ==
One method of getting materials needed from the moon into orbit would be the use of robotic climbing vehicles. These vehicles would consist of two large wheels pressing against the ribbons of the elevator to provide enough friction for lift. The climbers could be set for horizontal or vertical ribbons.

The wheels would be driven by electric motors, which would obtain their power from solar energy or beamed energy. The power required to climb the ribbon would depend upon the lunar gravity field, which drops off the first few percent of the distance to L_{1}. The power that a climber would require to traverse the ribbon drops in proportion to proximity to the L_{1} point. If a 540 kg climber traveled at a velocity of fifteen meters per second, by the time it was seven percent of the way to the L_{1} point, the required power would drop to less than a hundred watts, versus 10 kilowatts at the surface.

One problem with using a solar powered vehicle is the lack of sunlight during some parts of the trip. For half of every month, the solar arrays on the lower part of the ribbon would be in the shade. One way to fix this problem would be to launch the vehicle at the base with a certain velocity then at the peak of the trajectory, attach it to the ribbon.

== Possible uses ==
Materials from Earth may be sent into orbit and then down to the Moon to be used by lunar bases and installations.

Former U.S. President George W. Bush, in an address about his Vision for Space Exploration, suggested that the Moon may serve as a cost-effective construction, launching and fueling site for future space exploration missions. As President Bush noted, "(Lunar) soil contains raw materials that might be harvested and processed into rocket fuel or breathable air." For example, the proposed Ares V heavy-lift rocket system could cost-effectively deliver raw materials from Earth to a docking station, (connected to the lunar elevator as a counterweight,) where future spacecraft could be built and launched, while extracted lunar resources could be shipped up from a base on the Moon's surface, near the elevator's anchoring point. If the elevator was connected somehow to a lunar base built near the Moon's north pole, then workers could also mine the water ice which is known to exist there, providing an ample source of readily accessible water for the crew at the elevator's docking station. Also, since the total energy needed for transit between the Moon and Mars is considerably less than for between Earth and Mars, this concept could lower some of the engineering obstacles to sending humans to Mars.

The lunar elevator could also be used to transport supplies and materials from the surface of the moon into the Earth's orbit and vice versa. According to Jerome Pearson, many of the Moon's material resources can be extracted and sent into Earth orbit more easily than if they were launched from the Earth's surface. For example, lunar regolith itself could be used as massive material to shield space stations or crewed spacecraft on long missions from solar flares, Van Allen radiation, and other kinds of cosmic radiation. The Moon's naturally occurring metals and minerals could be mined and used for construction. Lunar deposits of silicon, which could be used to build solar panels for massive satellite solar power stations, seem particularly promising.

One disadvantage of the lunar elevator is that the speed of the climbing vehicles may be too slow to efficiently serve as a human transportation system. In contrast to an Earth-based elevator, the longer distance from the docking station to the lunar surface would mean that any "elevator car" would need to be able to sustain a crew for several days, even weeks, before it reached its destination.

== See also ==
- Colonization of the Moon
- Non-rocket spacelaunch
- Skyhook (structure)
- Space tether
