= Overhaul ball =

Heavy ball above a crane's lifting hook

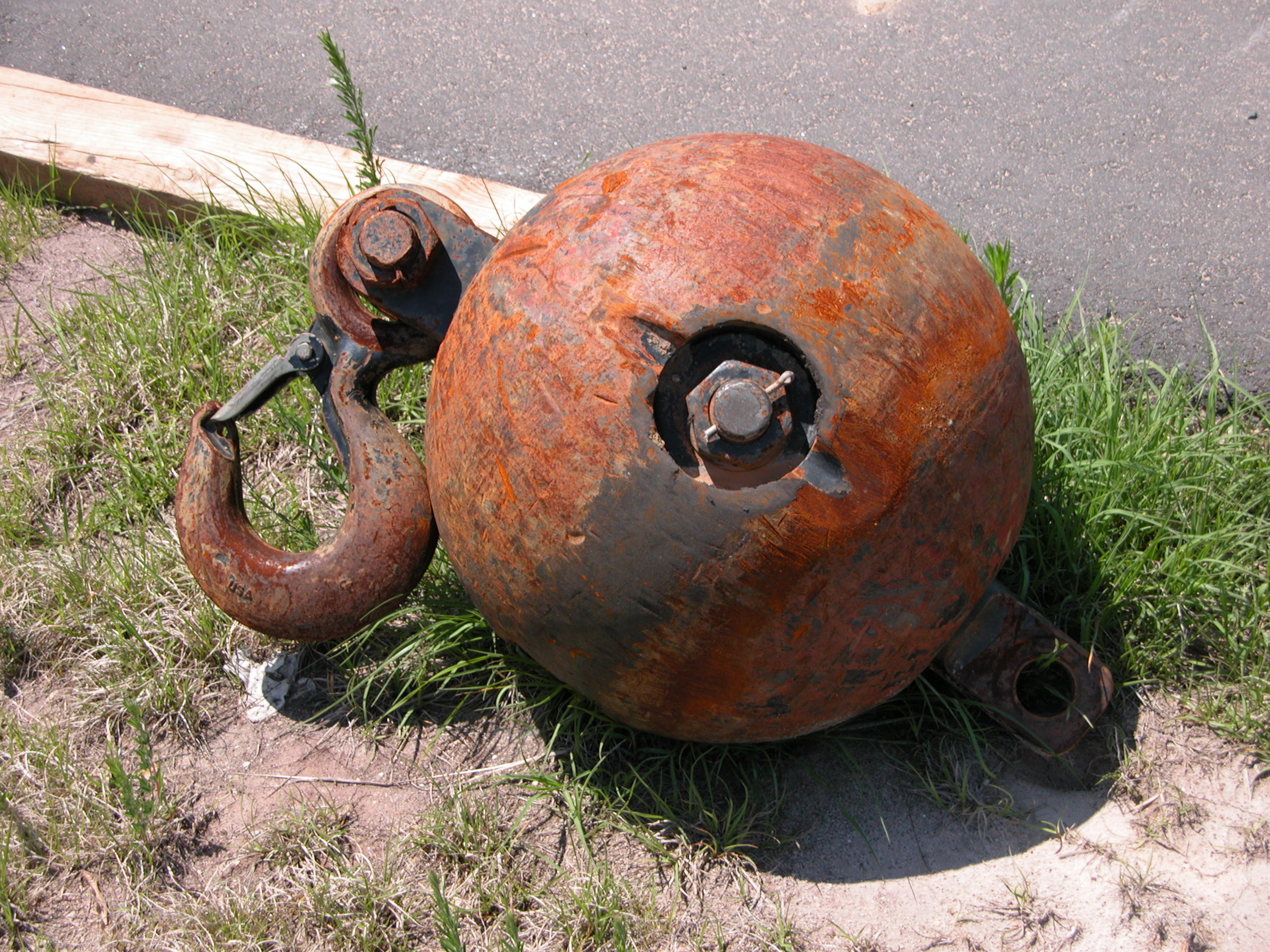
A crane hook and overhaul ball assembly

An overhaul ball, also known as an overhaul hook ball or headache ball, is a heavy weight that is attached to the end of a crane's cable, above the lifting hook. It is used to keep the cable under sufficient tension even when no load is attached. Although commonly spherical as the name suggests, overhaul balls may also be ellipsoidal or cylindrical.

Overhaul balls should be distinguished from wrecking balls, which although superficially similar looking, are different and serve a different purpose.
