= Chain =

Series of connected links which are typically made of metal

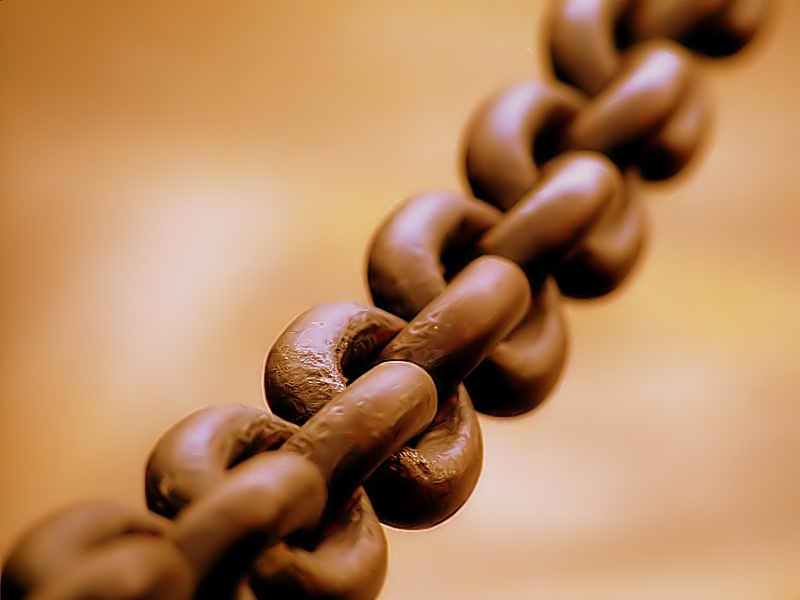
A common metal short-link chain

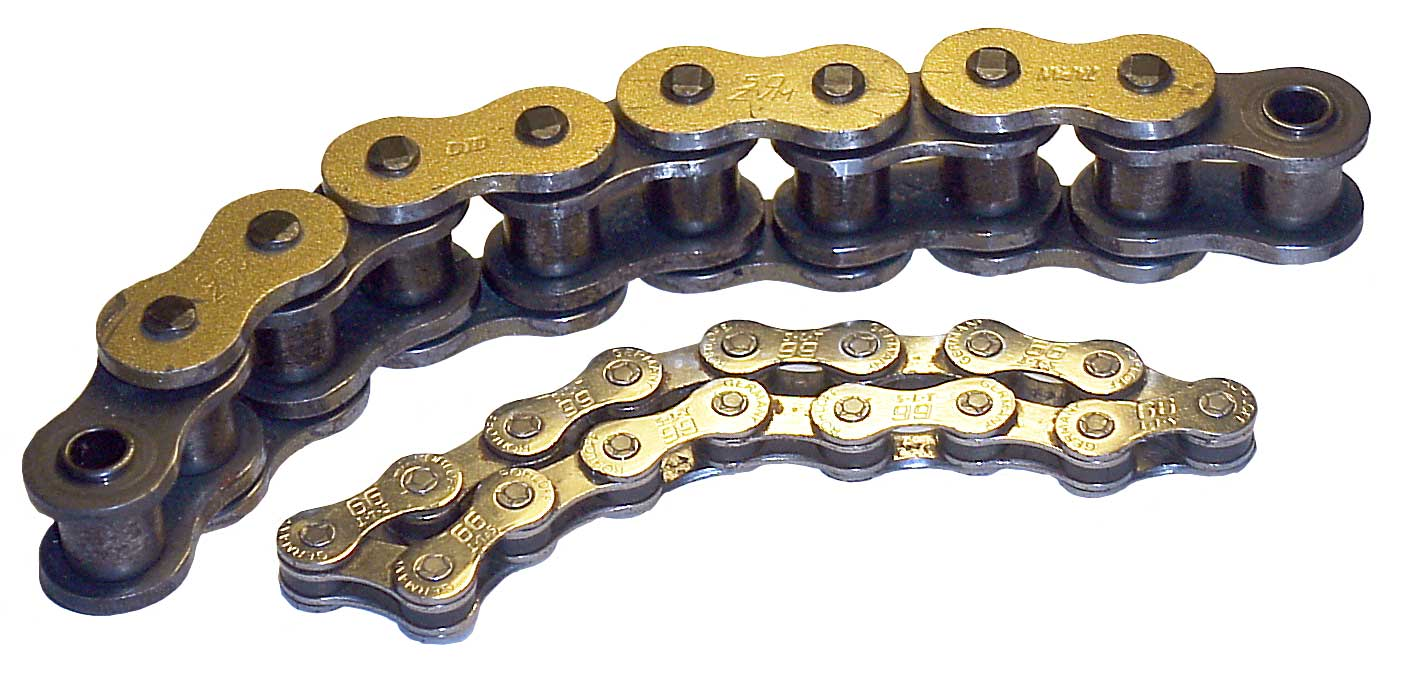
Roller chains

A chain is a serial assembly of connected links typically made of metal, with an overall character similar to that of a rope in that it is flexible and curved in compression, but linear, rigid, and load-bearing in tension. A chain may consist of two or more links. Chains can be classified by their design, which can be dictated by their use:

- Those designed for lifting, such as when used with a hoist; for pulling; or for securing, such as with a bicycle lock, have links that are torus-shaped, which make the chain flexible in two dimensions (the fixed third dimension being a chain's length). Small chains serving as jewellery are a mostly decorative analogue of such types.
- Those designed for transferring power in machines have links designed to mesh with the teeth of the sprockets of the machine, and are flexible in only one dimension. They are known as roller chains, though there are also non-roller chains such as block chains.

Two distinct chains can be connected using a quick link, carabiner, shackle, or clevis. The load can be transferred from one chain to another object by a chain stopper.

== Uses for chains ==
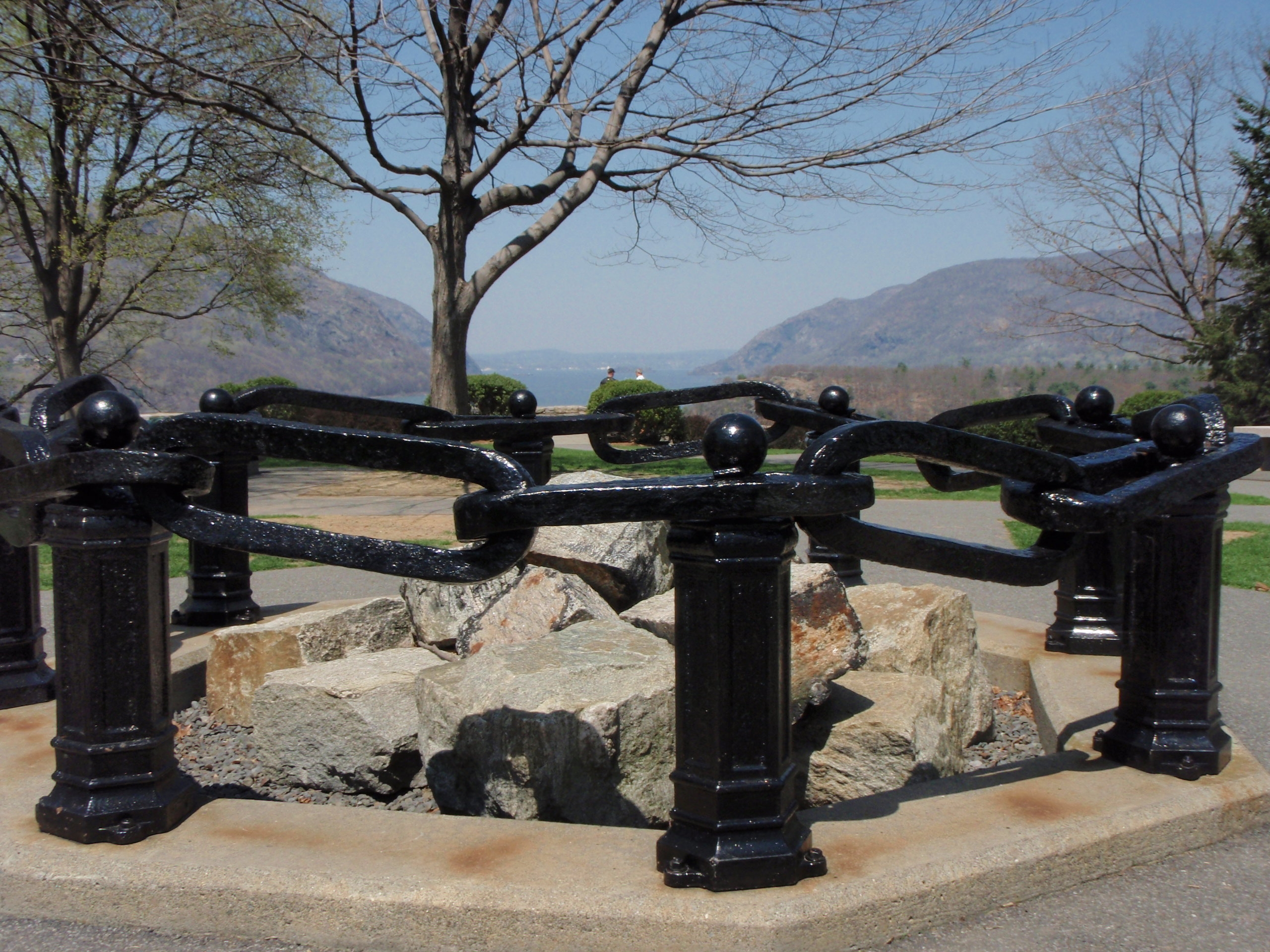
Links of the American Revolutionary War-era Hudson River Chain as a memorial at West Point

Uses for chains include:

=== Decoration ===
Making a silver chain

- Belly chain, a type of body jewelry worn around the waist
- Jewelry chain, many necklaces and bracelets are made out of small chains of gold and silver
- Chain of office, collar or heavy gold chain worn as insignia of office or a mark of fealty in medieval Europe and the United Kingdom
- Decorating clothing, some people wear wallets with chains connected to their belts, or pants decorated with chains
- Omega chain, a pseudo-chain where the 'links' are mounted on a backing rather than being interlinked
- Tie chain, used to hold in place a tie to the underlying shirt front

=== Power transfer ===
- Bicycle chain, a type of roller chain that transfers power from the pedals to the drive wheel of a bicycle, thus propelling it. The chain is made up of a number of rigid links that are hinged together by pin joints to provide the flexibility needed to wrap around the bicycle's gears.
- Chain gun, a type of machine gun that is driven by an external power source, sometimes connected by a chain, to actuate the mechanism rather than using recoil
- Chain pumps, a type of water pump where a loop of chain with inset discs is passed around then through a tube submerged in liquid
- Chainsaw, portable mechanical, motorized saw using a cutting chain to cut wood
- Timing chain, used to transfer rotational position from the crankshaft to the valve and ignition system on an internal combustion engine, typically with a 2:1 speed reduction.

=== Security and restraint ===
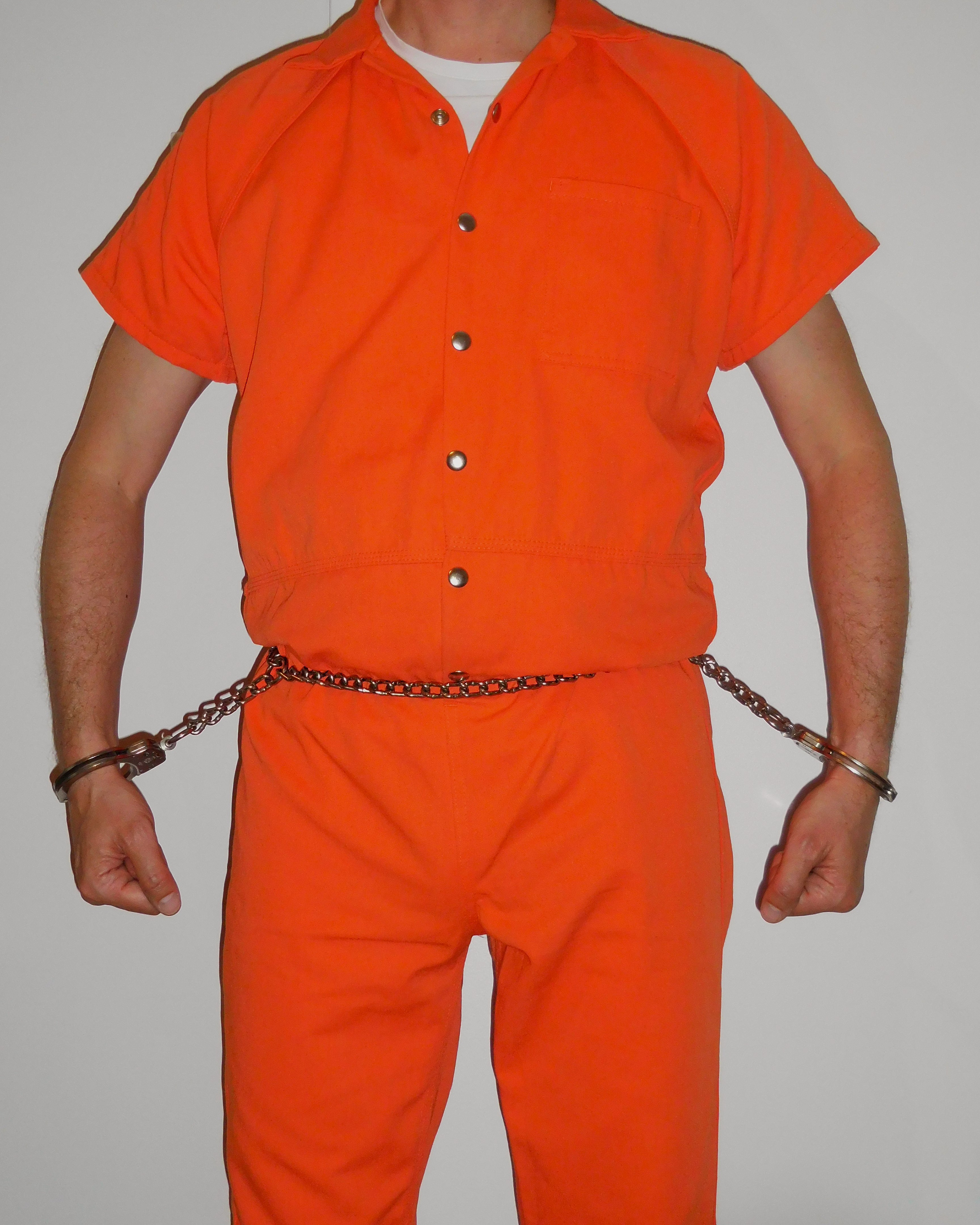
Prisoner in belly chain

- Ball and chain, a phrase that can refer to either the actual restraint device that was used to slow down prisoners, or a derogatory description of a person's significant other
- Belly chain (or waist chain), a physical restraint worn by prisoners, consisting of a chain around the prisoner's waist, to which the prisoner's hands are chained or cuffed
- Bicycle lock (or bicycle chain), lockable chain
- Chain boom, large chains used to exclude warships from harbors and rivers
- Chain link fencing, fencing that uses vertical wires that are bent in a zigzag fashion and linked to each other.
- Chain mail, a type of armor consisting of small metal rings linked together in a pattern to form a mesh.
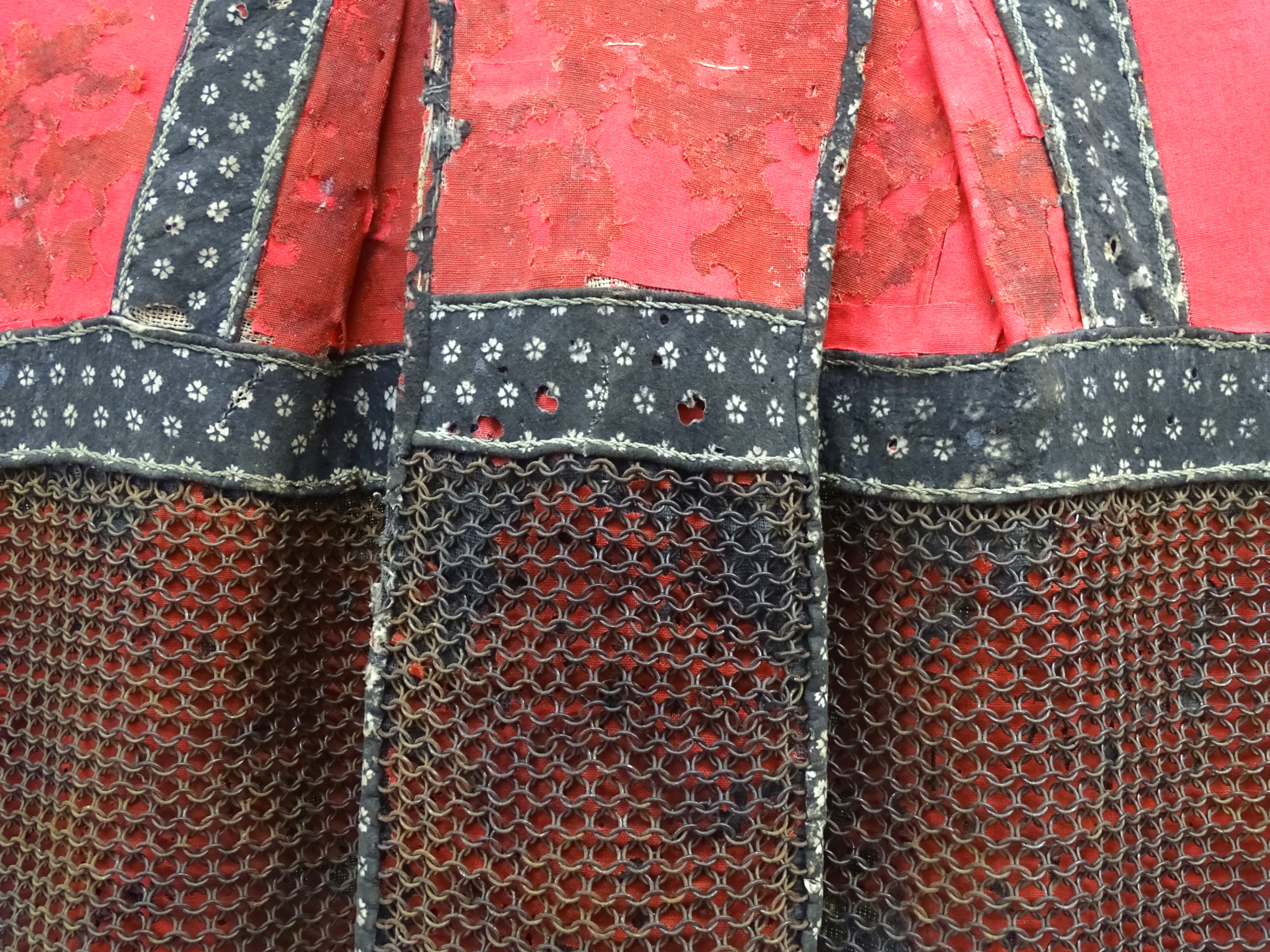
- Example of chain mail on samurai armor, consisting of a mesh of interlocking links. Chain mail was a common armor material around the world during the iron age, as it allowed for decent protection and mobility while usually requiring less materials and labor than plate armor.
  Door chain, a type of security chain on a door that makes it possible to open a door from the inside while still making it difficult for someone outside to force their way inside
- Gang transport chain, a chain used to shackle two or more inmates together for transport or work outside the facility, forming a chain gang
- H-style restraints, a combination consisting of handcuffs on a belly chain with a connector chain running down to a set of leg irons
- Leg iron chains (fetters), an alternative to handcuffs
- Prisoner transport restraints, a combination which consists of a pair of handcuffs attached by a longer chain to a pair of leg irons
- On chain-linked handcuffs, the cuffs are held together by a short chain

=== Traction, pulling and lifting ===
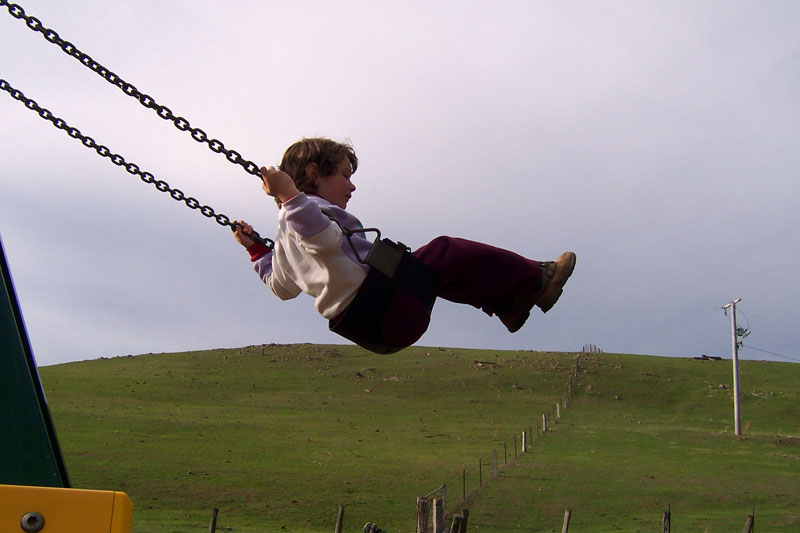
A child supported by chains as he swings in a playground.

- Anchor cable, or chain cable, as used by ships and boats; in British nautical usage the component is a cable, the material is chain
  - Selected based on chain grade, diameter, coil, and either galvanized steel or stainless steel finish
- Chain slings
- Chain hoist, device used for lifting or lowering a load
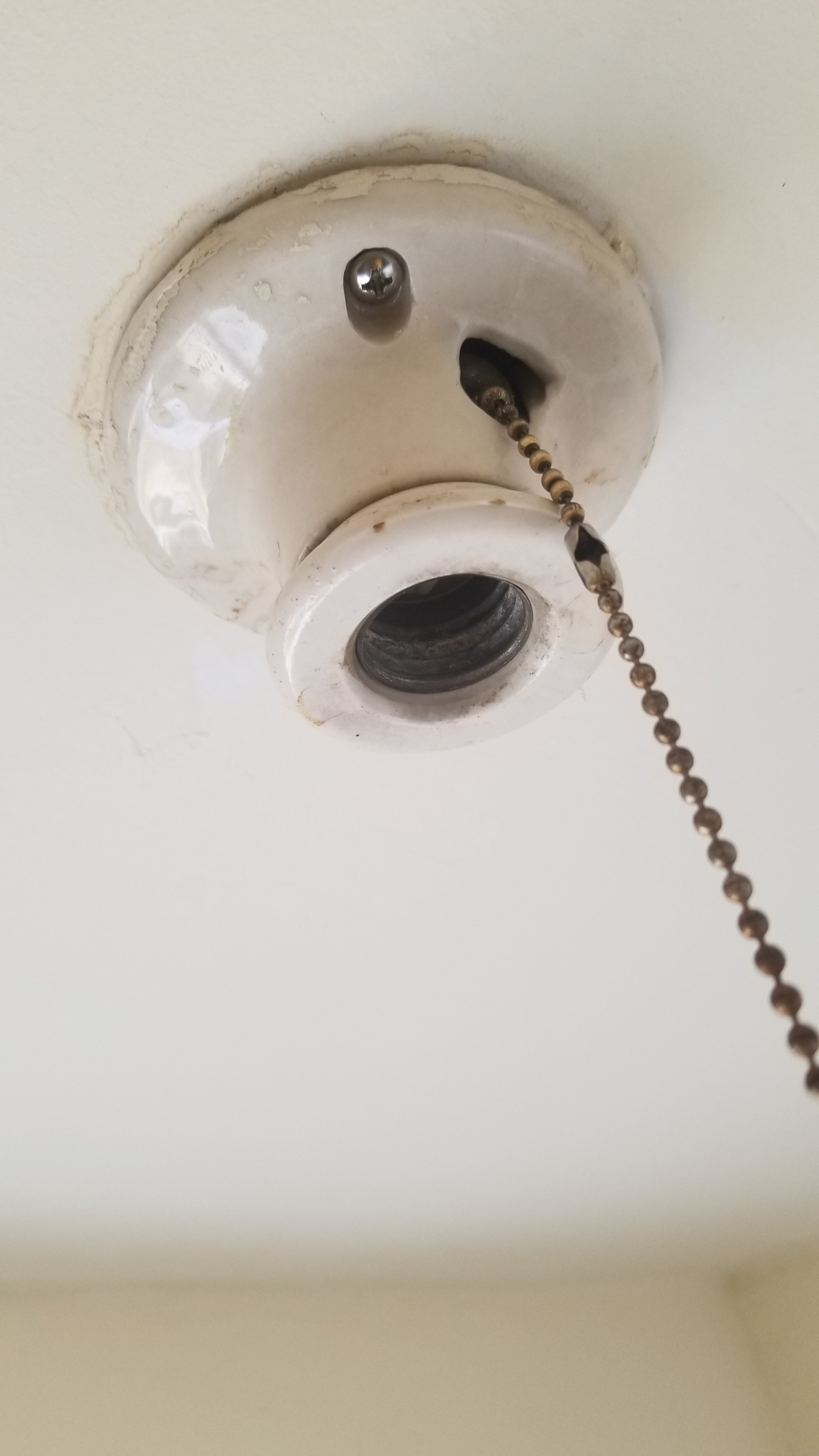
  Ball chain pull switch for a ceiling light
- Chain boat, a type of river craft that used a steel chain laid along the riverbed for its propulsion
- Chain-linked lewis, a self-locking lifting device particularly for stone using a chain link as a pivot
- Curb chain, used on curb bits when riding a horse
- High-tensile chain (or transport chain), chain with a high tensile strength used for towing or securing loads
- Holding things up with its tensile strength, ranging from playground swings, to wrecking balls, to incense censers, etc.
- Jack chain, a toothed chain used to move logs
- Lead shank (or stud chain), used on horses that are misbehaving
- Pull switch, an electrical switch operated by a ball chain
  - Lavatory chain, the chain attached to the cistern of an old-fashioned W.C. in which the flushing power is obtained by a gravity feed from above-head height. Although most cisterns no longer work like that, the phrase "pull the chain" is still encountered to mean "flush the toilet".
- Rigid chain actuator, a type of chain that only bends in one direction, allowing it to operate under compression
- Snow chains, used to improve traction in snow

=== Weapons ===
- Chain gun, type of machine gun that is driven by an external power source, sometimes connected by a chain, to actuate the mechanism rather than using recoil
- Chain shot, a type of ammunition for a cannon, used to inflict damage to the rigging of a sail vessel in naval warfare
- Chain weapon, a medieval weapon made of one or more weights attached to a handle with a chain
- Kusarigama, combined a sickle and a chain with a weighted end. It was used in martial arts such as kusarigamajutsu
- Kusari-fundo, also known as manriki-gusari, was a chain with weighted ends, employed by samurai and law enforcement for striking and entangling.
- Chain whip, (e.g., seven-section whip) consists of metal rods connected by rings and is used for both combat and performance

=== Other uses ===
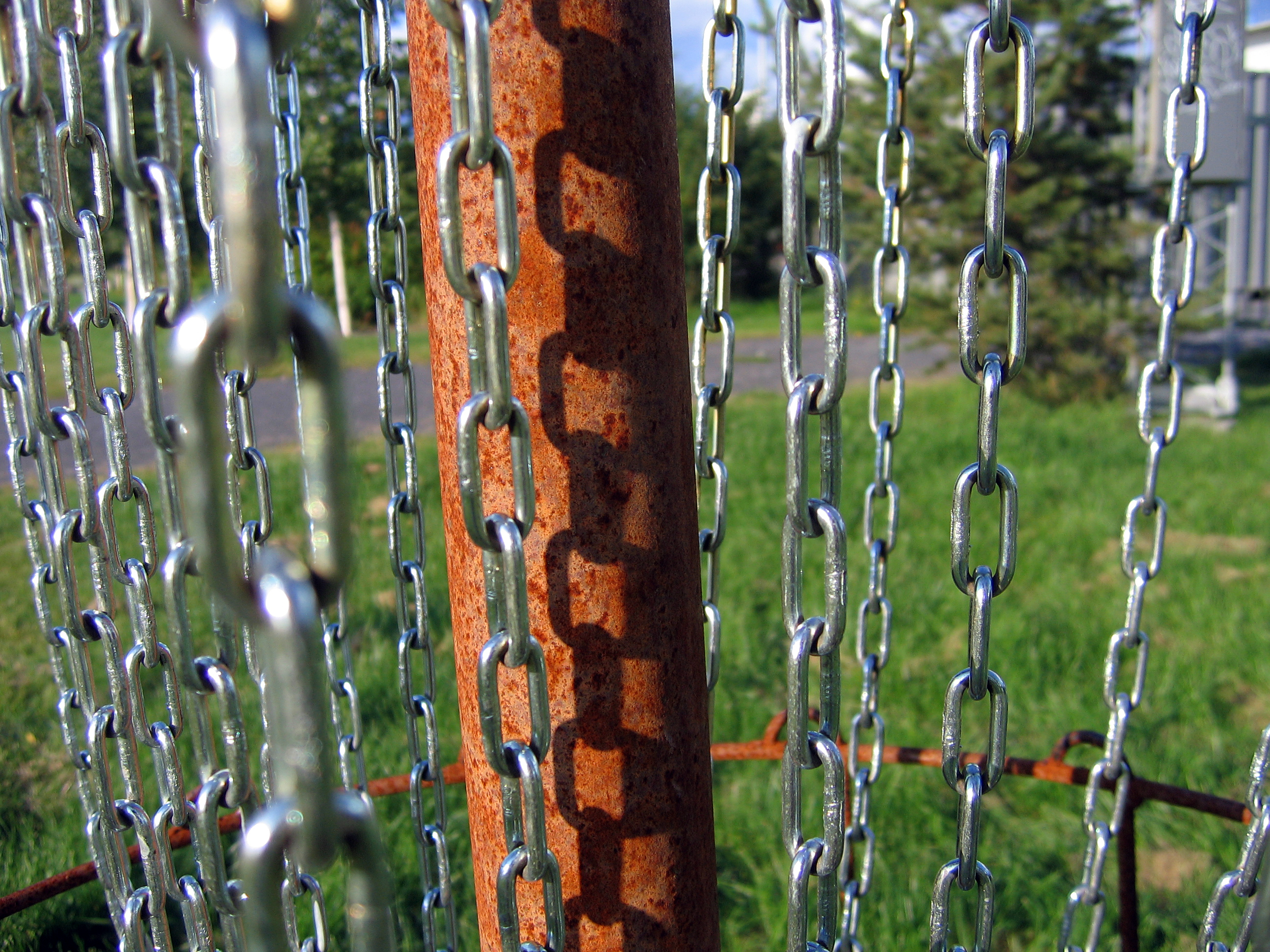
Chains on a disc golf basket

- Chains are a standard component of the deflection assembly of disc golf baskets.
- Chains can be used as a percussion instrument for special effects, such as in Arnold Schoenberg's Gurre-Lieder and Leoš Janáček's From the House of the Dead.
- Keychain, a small chain that connects a small item to a keyring
- Chain sinnet, a method of shortening a rope or other cable while in use or for storage
- Chain stitch, a sewing and embroidery technique
- Chains were introduced by Chanel as weights in clothes, to improve their overall look.

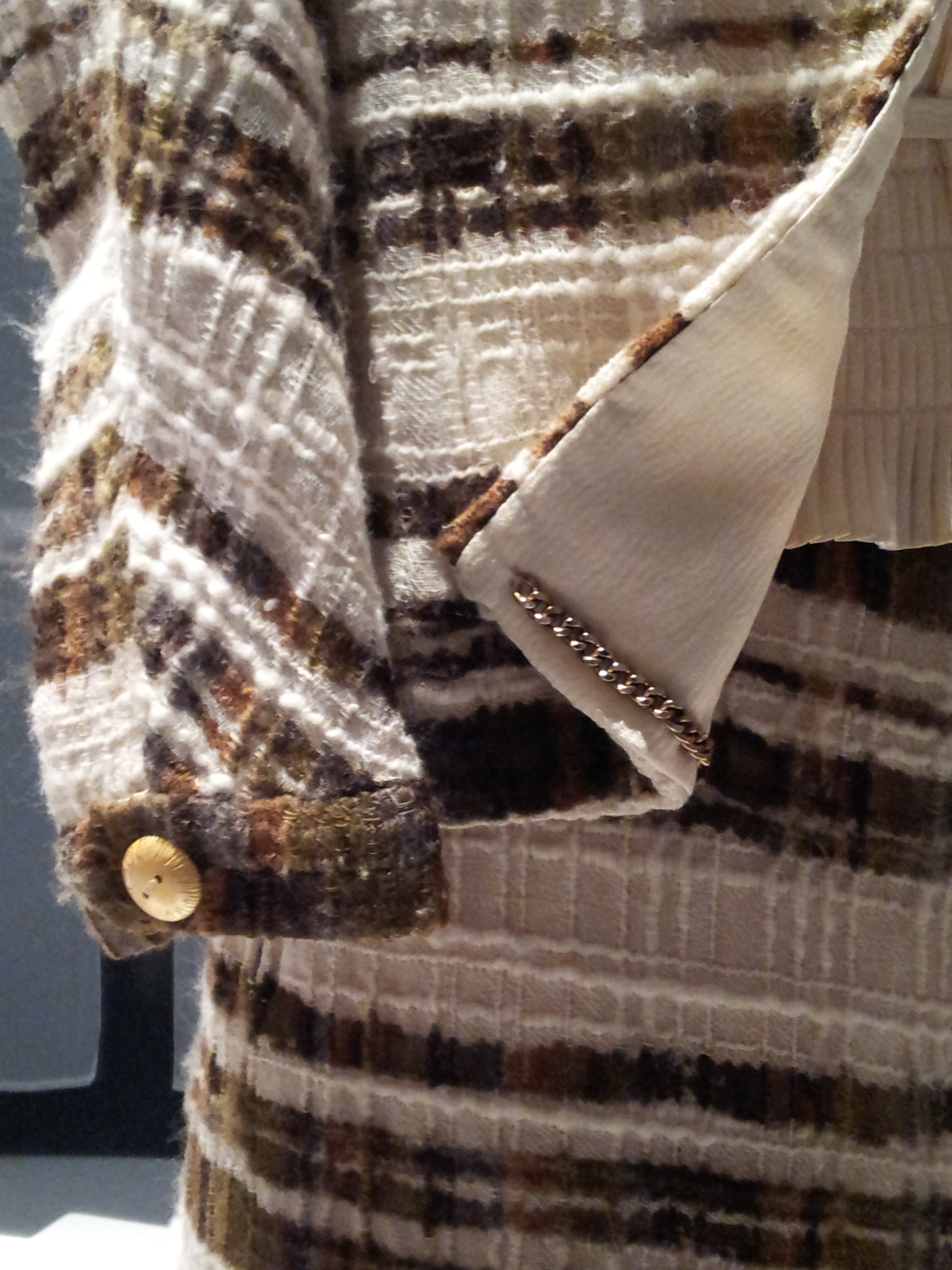
1965 Chanel suit showing a "Chanel chain"

== Types of chain ==
- Ball chain, type of chain consisting of small sheet metal balls connected via short lengths of wire
- Calibrated chain, a type chain where the link lengths are within a given tolerance, so that it reliably engages with a windlass.
- Flat chain, form of chain used chiefly in agricultural machinery
- Ladder chain, a light wire chain used with sprockets for low torque power transmission
- Long link chain
- O-ring chain, a specialized type of roller chain
- Roller chain, the type of chain most commonly used for transmission of mechanical power on bicycles, motorcycles, and in industrial and agricultural machinery
- Self-lubricating chain, type of chain that uses a bush to continually lubricate the chain
- Silent chain, a type of chain in which the links engage the sprockets similarly to gear teeth
- Stud link chain, a type of chain with metal between the sides of each link, keeping the attached links in place. This helps prevent bunching when the chain is run out from a storage bin, as for use in anchoring ships.
- Short link chain, a chain where the gap between attached links is small relative to thickness.

== Connections ==
Several methods are available to connect chain ends to each other or to other objects, and to apply a load to a chain away from the ends. These methods are usually specific to the type of chain, and must be of the correct size.

== History ==
The earliest uses of the chain date to ancient Egypt (between 3150 and 332 BC), where it was used for moving water in the elevator systems. Such systems were also used in China, by the Han dynasty (202 BC – 220 AD), to move water around rice terraces.

The metal link chain has been in use since at least 225 BC.

== Symbolism ==
The prevalent modern symbolism is oppression due to the use for a mechanical restriction of the liberty of a human or animal.

Conversely, a broken chain can represent freedom or liberty from said oppression.

Chains can also symbolize interconnectivity or interdependence. Unicode, in versions 6.x, contains the U+1F517 🔗 LINK SYMBOL, which may show chain link(s). It may also denote a hyperlink.

== Gallery ==
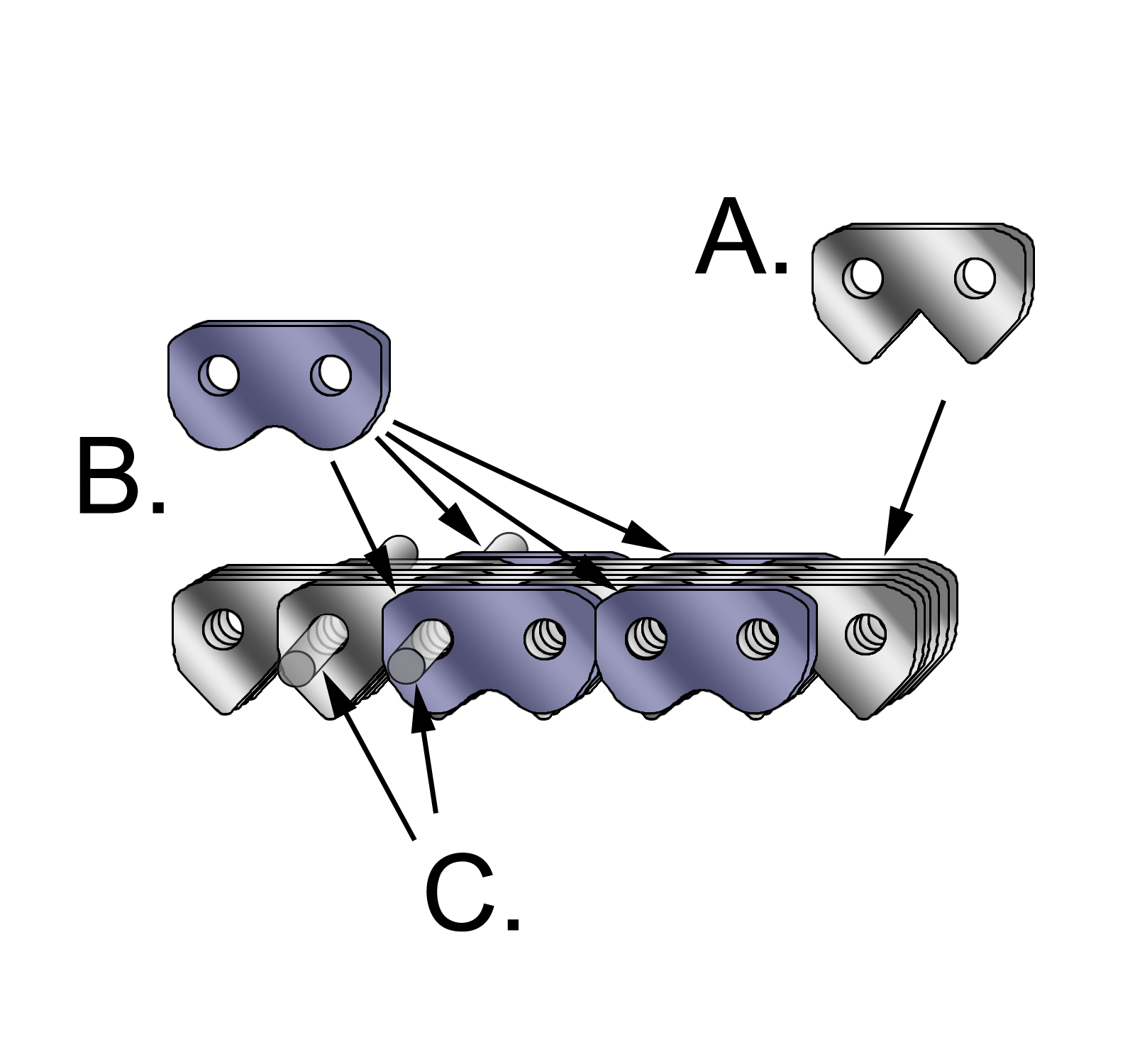
Silent chain

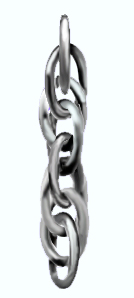
Rope chain

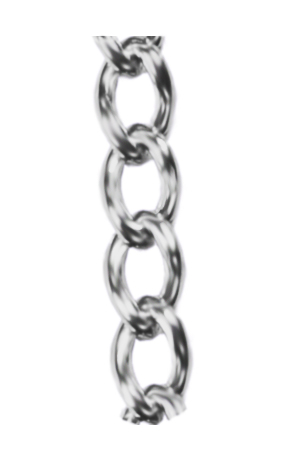
Twisted link chain

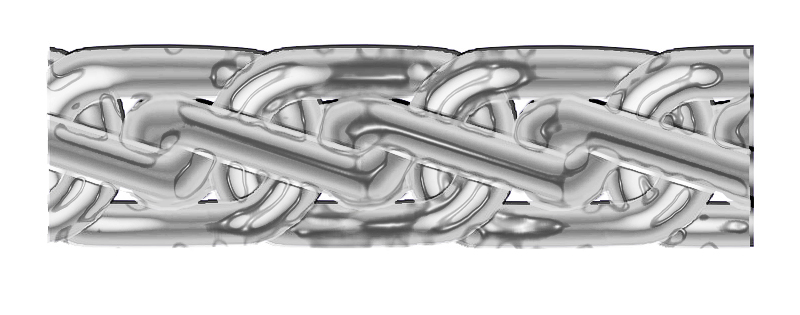
Wheat chain

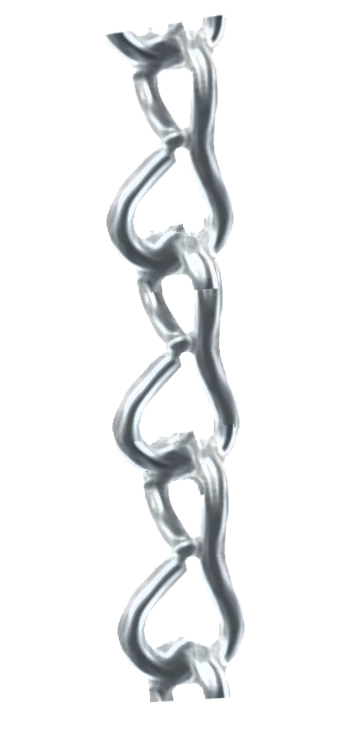
Single jack chain

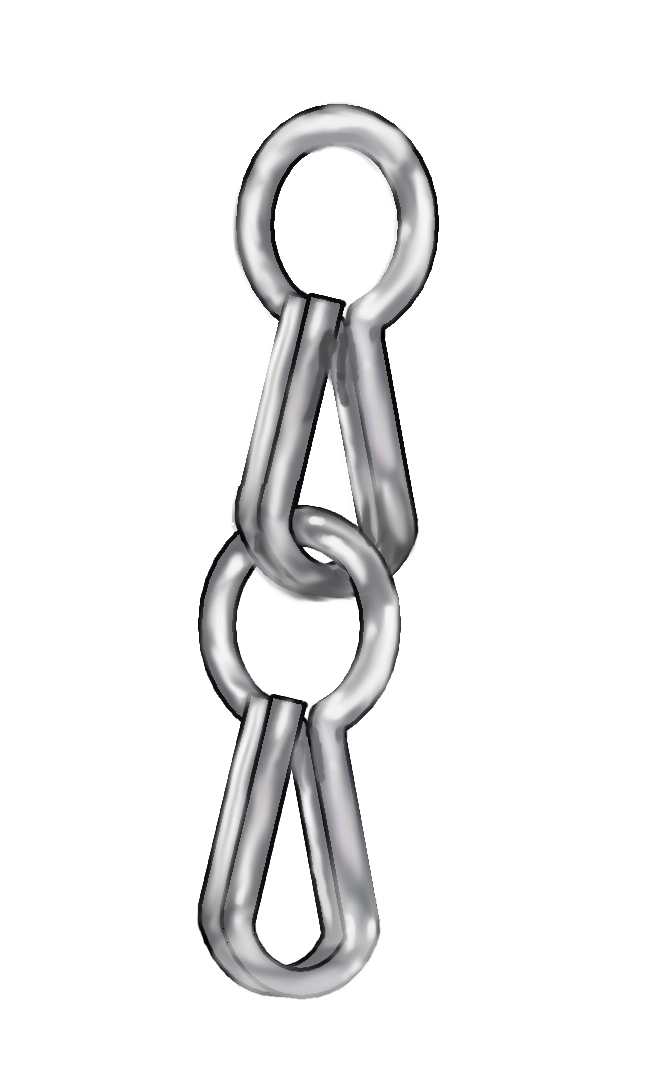
Double jack chain

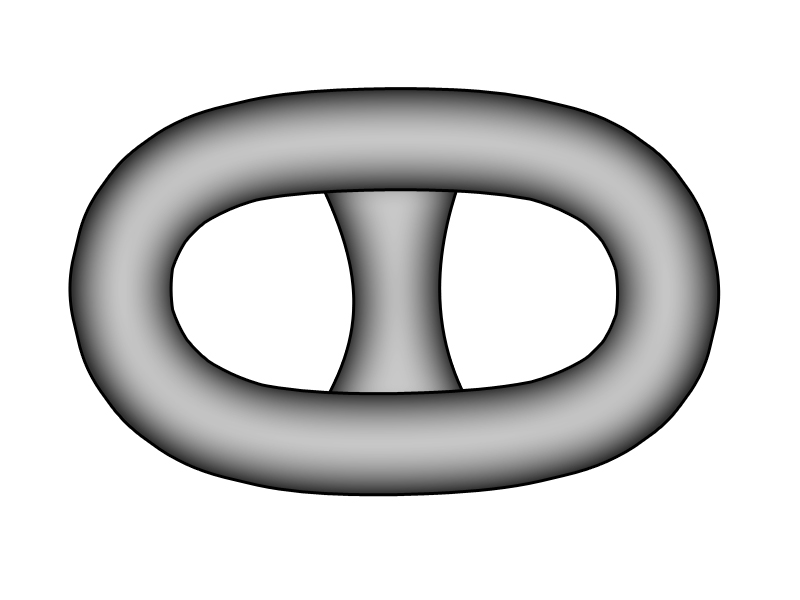
Stud link chain

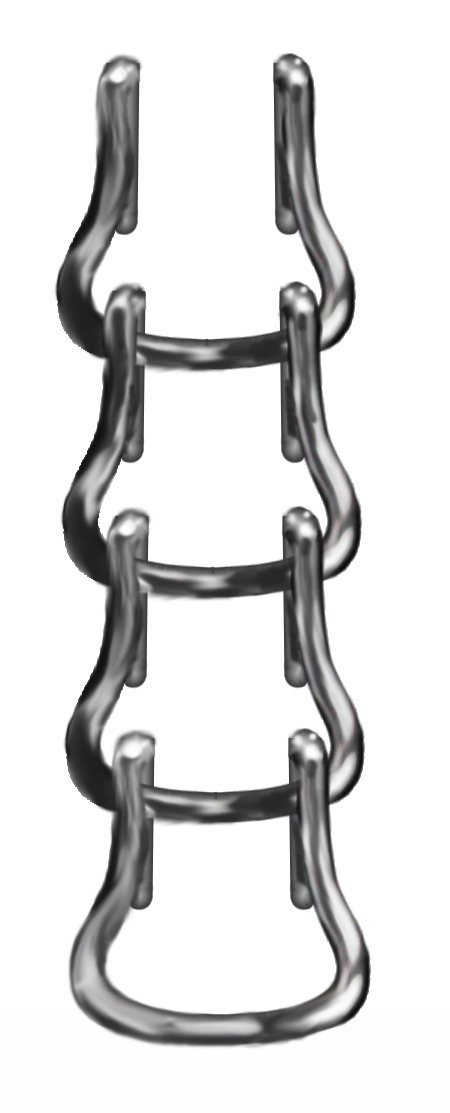
Ladder link chain

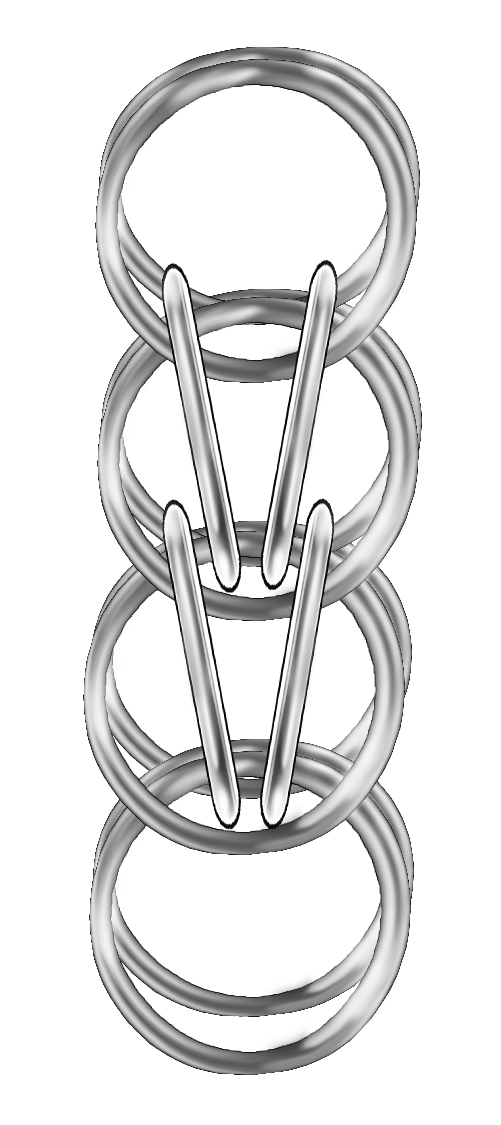
Foxtail chain

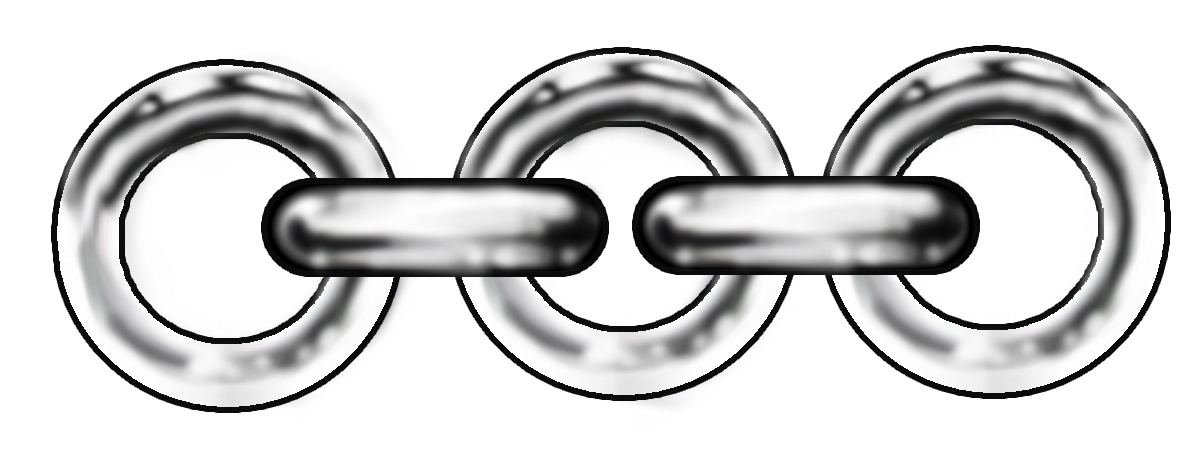
Rolo chain

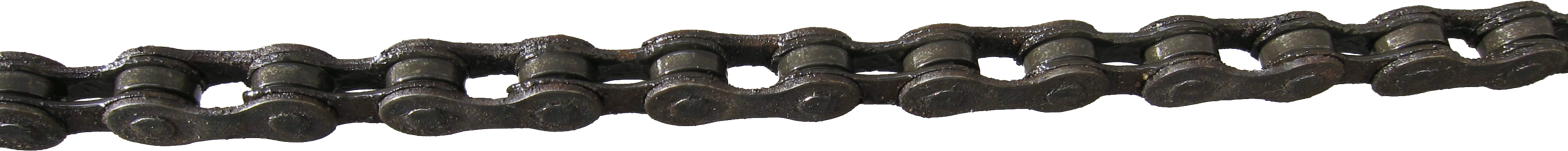
Roller Chain

== See also ==
- Belt (mechanical) – Method of connecting two rotating shafts or pulleys
- Buffers and chain coupler – Coupling for railway vehicles
- Chain (unit) – Unit of length
- Chain gang – Group of prisoners chained together
- Chain letter – Letter written in succession by a group of people
- Gunter's chain – Distance measuring device used for surveying
- Lariat chain – Science demonstration
- Rigging – Ropes, cables and chains which support masts of sailing ships
- Rigging (material handling) – Equipment and procedure in material handling
