= High-tensile chain =

Chain used for drawing or securing loads

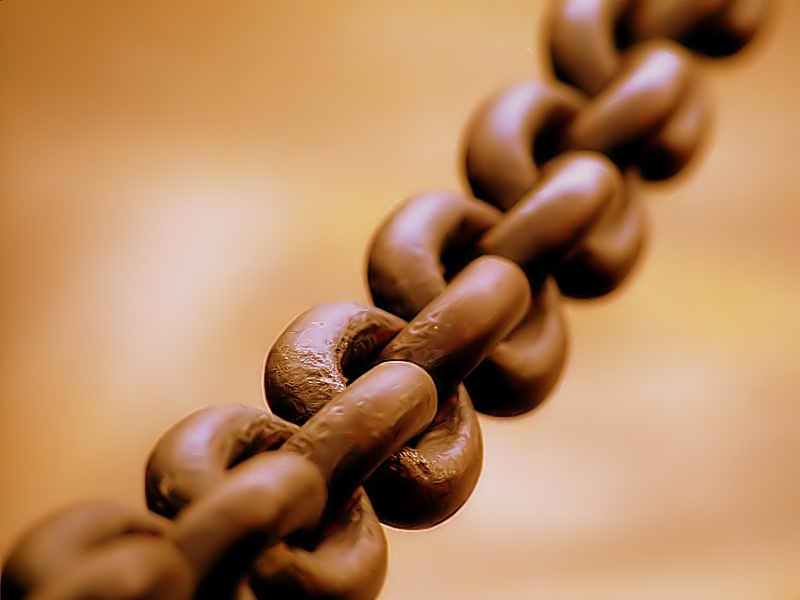
A broad metal chain made of torus-shaped links.

A high-tensile chain, also referred to as a transport chain, is a link chain with a high tensile strength used for drawing or securing loads. This type of chain usually consist of broad (thick/heavy) metal, oblong torus-shaped links for high strength. All the links of the chain are usually identical, and on the ends are usually two hooks of the appropriate size and strength to slide easily over one chain link but small enough not let the links slip by. When the ability to grasp the load is required, a slip hook is used.

The chain used for tire chains on tractors and some automobiles for better traction is very similar; usually consisting of the same type of link, especially so for snow chains; however, instead of being a single chain, it is more of a network of interconnected chains with no hooked ends; the size and design of the network depending on the tire it was intended for.

When chains are used to restrain loads on a vehicle a load binder is used to tighten the chain.

Standards development organizations such as the American Society of Mechanical Engineers provide Standards for the additional information on these chains. ASME B29.24 deals specifically with roller chains intended for hoisting duty. ASME B29.26 provides uniform procedures for fatigue testing on chains.

In summary; transport chains are high strength chains used in imprecise applications where much strength is needed yet the task served is rather straightforward.

== See also ==
- Hoist (device)
- Lifting hook
- Shackle
- Clevis fastener
