= Bucket elevator =

Mechanism for lifting flowable materials

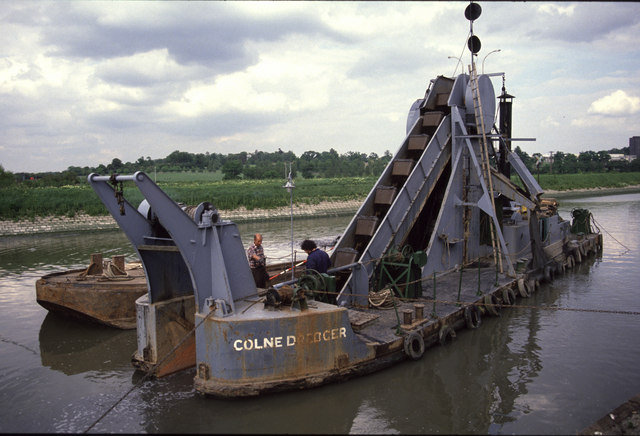
A river bucket elevator

A bucket elevator, also called a grain leg, is a mechanism for hauling flowable bulk materials (most often grain or fertilizer) vertically.

It consists of:

1. Buckets to contain the material;
2. A belt to carry the buckets and transmit the pull;
3. Means to drive the belt;
4. Accessories for loading the buckets or picking up the material, for receiving the discharged material, for maintaining the belt tension and for enclosing and protecting the elevator.

A bucket elevator can elevate a variety of bulk materials from light to heavy and from fine to large lumps.

A centrifugal discharge elevator may be vertical or inclined. Vertical elevators depend entirely on centrifugal force to get the material into the discharge chute, and so must be run at a relatively high speed. Inclined elevators with buckets spaced apart or set close together may have the discharge chute set partly under the head pulley. Since they do not depend entirely on centrifugal force to put the material into the chute, their speed may be slower.

Nearly all centrifugal discharge elevators have spaced buckets with rounded bottoms. They pick up their load from a boot, a pit, or a pile of material at the foot pulley.

The buckets can be also triangular in cross-section and set close together on the belt with little or no clearance between them. This is a continuous bucket elevator. Its main use is to carry difficult materials at a slow speed.

Early bucket elevators used a flat chain with small, steel buckets attached every few inches. While some elevators are still manufactured with a chain and steel buckets, most current bucket elevators use a rubber belt with plastic buckets. Pulleys several feet in diameter are used at the top and bottom. The top pulley is driven by an electric motor.

The bucket elevator is the enabling technology that permitted the construction of grain elevators. A diverter at the top of the elevator allows the grain to be sent to the chosen bin.

A similar device with flat steps is occasionally used as an elevator for humans, e.g. for employees in parking garages. (This sort of elevator is generally considered too dangerous for use by the public.)

== Bucket elevator styles ==
There are three common bucket elevator designs seen in bulk material handling facilities worldwide:

- Centrifugal Discharge Elevator – This is the typical style of elevator used in many grain handling facilities. The elevator buckets discharge the grain freely, using centrifugal force. The grain is flung out of the bucket into the discharge spout at the top of the elevator. The most common style of agricultural elevator bucket is the "CC" style. This style can be recognized by the four breaks in the inside bottom of the bucket, straight sides, and the presence of high sides or "ears".
- Continuous Discharge Elevator – This style of bucket elevator is used typically to discharge sluggish and non-free flowing materials; the elevator buckets discharge on top of each other. To achieve the required centrifugal force, a speed of around 6 metres (20 feet) per second is used. Common styles of elevator buckets used are the MF, HF, LF, and HFO due to their "V" style, among other attributes.
- Positive Discharge Elevator – Buckets are used to elevate delicate products such as popcorn, candy and potato chips (British: crisps), for which gentle handling is very important. This style elevator bucket operates off a double strand chain; the buckets are held in place by two pins so that they can swivel freely. To discharge the bucket, it is mechanically flipped, but until then the bucket is held parallel to the floor and upright. These elevators typically form an "S" or "L" in design and run throughout a plant.
