= The Richards Group =

Advertising agency in Dallas, Texas

- Trade name: TRG
- Company type: Private
- Industry: Advertising
- Founded: 1976
- Founder: Stan Richards
- Headquarters: Dallas, Texas, United States
- Key people: Pete Lempert (CEO); Terence Reynolds (CCO); Michelle Gardner (CFO); Randy Bradshaw (CTO)
- Number of employees: 200+
- Website: trg.agency

The Richards Group, now known as TRG, is an advertising agency in Dallas, Texas, United States. The company was recognized as an Adweek Agency of the Year in 1988, 1990, 1994, and 2002. TRG’s “We’ll leave the light on for you” radio campaign for Motel 6 was named one of the “Top 100 Ad Campaigns in American History” by Ad Age magazine before the agency lost the business due to a racism scandal. Its “Farmer” TV ad for Ram Trucks was one of the highest-scoring Super Bowl spots in USA Today’s 2013 “Ad Meter” ranking. The Chick-fil-A cows created by TRG were inducted into the Madison Avenue Advertising Walk of Fame in 2007.

In October 2020, following racist comments made by the agency's founder, Stan Richards, the company lost two of its longtime clients, Motel 6 (34 years) and Home Depot (25 years); other clients also decided to leave the firm, including Keurig Dr Pepper, the brewers of Shiner Bock beer and grocery chain H-E-B. Richards (who had recently delegated most day-to-day management of the firm to his senior creative directors as part of a previously announced succession plan) resigned from the firm soon thereafter.

The agency handled advertising, public relations, and promotions for clients, in addition to sports/entertainment marketing for colleges and universities.

In 2022, the agency changed its name to TRG in an attempt to distance itself from Stan Richards, and to signal a change in direction. The agency moved after Stan Richards and Scot Dykema, the manager of a partnership called SBR Holdings, which owned the building, sold it to a group of commercial real estate investors.

In March 2025, Pete Lempert succeeded Glenn Dady as chief executive officer. Lempert, who joined the agency in 1994 and was promoted to principal in 1996, has led business for a range of major clients including Corona Beer, Nokia, Advance Auto Parts, Charles Schwab, and Orkin. Prior to his appointment as CEO, he served as chief development officer and managing principal. Dady, who became CEO in 2019 after nearly four decades with the agency, retired in conjunction with the leadership transition. In statements marking the change, both leaders emphasized Lempert’s long tenure, experience, and alignment with the agency’s creative and business direction as it continues to evolve in a changing marketplace.

Agency veteran Terence Reynolds was promoted to the position of Chief Creative Officer in April 2025. Reynolds had served at the agency for approximately 30 years, most recently as executive creative director and a member of the creative council, and was tasked with leading TRG’s creative output and mentoring diverse talent across the organization.

In November 2025, Love’s Travel Stops named TRG as its strategic creative, media, and brand agency of record, with the partnership beginning in January 2026. The appointment followed an extensive review process and was part of Love’s effort to strengthen its marketing capabilities and evolve its brand identity.

== History ==
In 1953, Stan Richards began doing freelance design work in Dallas.

The company became a full-service advertising agency in 1976 and in 1986, Motel 6 was signed as a client.

In 2016, The Richards Group took AOR (agency of record) for Blue Bell Creameries. In 2018, Dish Network selected The Richards Group as its creative agency of record.

In 2020, The Richards Group and Motel 6 ended their relationship over racist remarks by the agency founder. Home Depot also dropped The Richards Group following the founder's racist remarks. Several other clients left The Richards Group after the racist comments.

In 2020, Stan Richards resigned from The Richards Group and Glenn Dady took over as the CEO. TRG projected an ad for Choctaw Casinos onto the Leaning Tower of Dallas.

In 2021, TRG hired Sue Batterton as the first Chief Creative Officer and Nikki Wilson as Chief Talent and Cultural Officer.

In 2022, The Richards Group rebranded to TRG relocated its headquarters from Uptown to The Stack, Hines’ office/retail project at 2700 Commerce in Deep Ellum. TRG hired a new chief financial officer, Michelle Gardner, to oversee the firm’s accounting team and worked with actor Ken Jeong to create a campaign for Thermacare.

In 2023, TRG created new spots for Dave’s Killer Bread, supporting second chance for incarcerated employees, and for Choctaw Casinos featuring former Dallas sports stars.
