= Counter pen =

Pen designed to be affixed to a counter or table

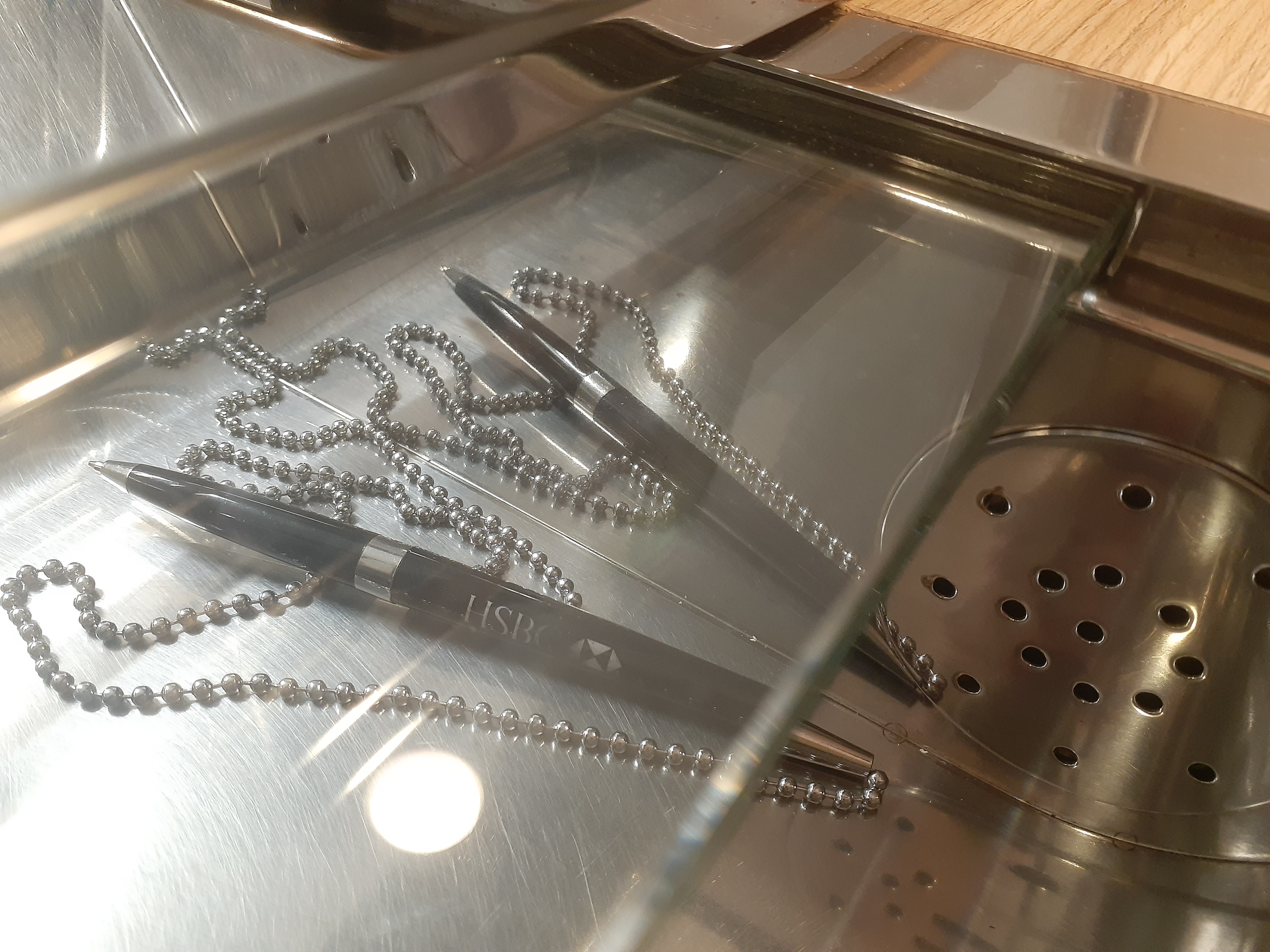
Pens at a bank counter in Hong Kong

A counter pen is a pen designed to be affixed to the counter or table of an institution, such as a bank or a post office, typically by a chain, ball chain or plastic cord, making it less likely that the pen will be accidentally or purposefully removed.

A 1938 issue of The Bankers Monthly describes the concept: "The pen also gives a better write than the ordinary counter pen. The ink stand cannot be stolen, for it is fastened to the counter or desk. Besides, a chain between pen and stand prevents anyone from wandering away with the pen."

== See also ==
- List of pen types, brands and companies
