= Keith Lofstrom =

American electrical engineer

Keith Lofstrom (born 1953 in Portland, Oregon) is an American electrical engineer. He has a BSEE and MSEE from University of California, Berkeley. He is more widely known in the space advocacy community for a ground-based space launcher design, the Launch Loop, for which he has been credited by name in several works of science fiction. Frederik Pohl, who used the idea in several of his stories, once wrote that, of all the non-rocket spacelaunch concepts, he liked the Lofstrom Loop "best of all."

As an electrical engineer, Lofstrom specializes in mixed-signal integrated circuit design. A paper he wrote on boundary scan methods was one of two to receive an Honorable Mention at the 1997 IEEE International Test Conference. One of his 9 patents is for a way to read an individual digital ID for integrated circuits that arises from random atomic variations inherent in the semiconductor device fabrication process.

One of his more recent efforts in speculative space systems is Server Sky, a very large satellite constellation in Earth orbit using thin-film solar cells to power data center computers integrated into the same wafers as the PV cells.

He is signed up for cryopreservation with the Alcor Life Extension Foundation, since 1992.
