= Ball chain =

Type of chain

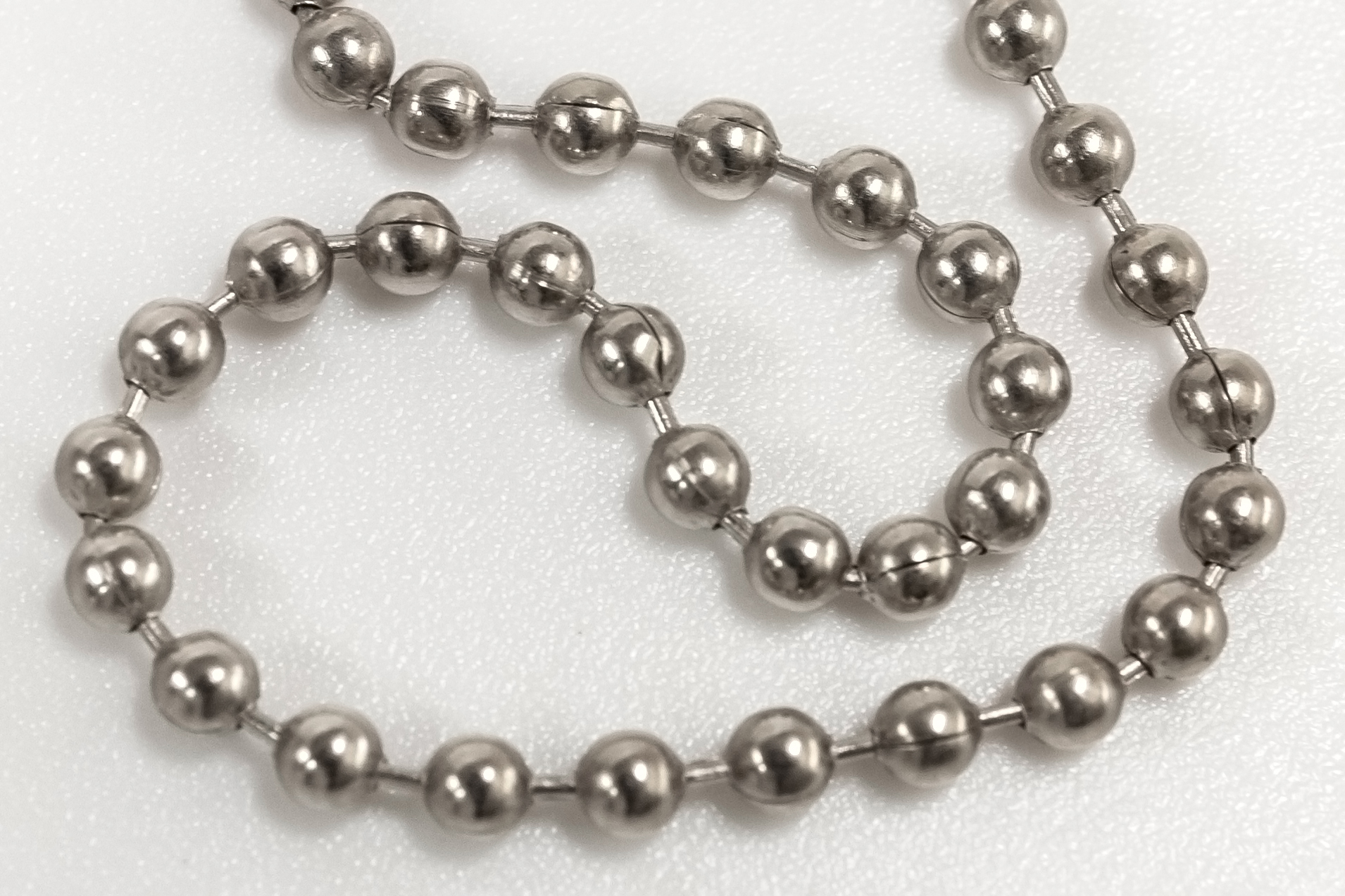
Ball chain detail

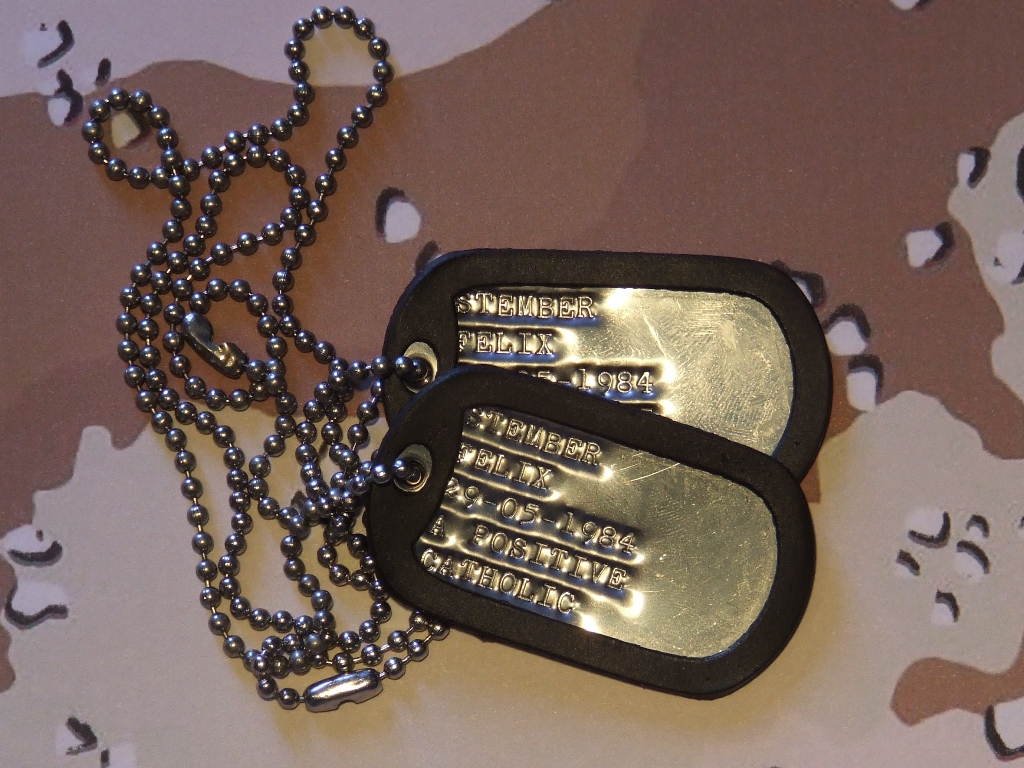
Dogtags on ball chain

Ball chain or bead chain is a type of chain consisting of small sheet metal balls connected via short lengths of wire.

The balls are hollow and have two small antipodal holes. These holes accept a short length of wire deformed on the end like a rivet so that the end is bound inside the ball. The wire is then connected to another ball using the same method. Many of the balls and wires are joined together to form a chain. Because of the connection method, the chain can swivel on itself unrestrictedly, which helps prevent kinking. However, the chain has a relatively low strength. Ball chains are also sometimes known as snake link or toilet chain.

The most common ball chain accessories are connectors. Each end of a connector is able to surround a ball at the end of a chain and snap over its wire connection, which holds it secure. These can be used to connect two lengths of chain, or to connect the ends of the same chain to form a loop. The connectors require no tools to apply or remove and are reusable.

Other common accessories include other terminations similar to the connectors, but with a different connection on one end, such as a screw hole for semi-permanent affixing of a chain.

Common uses of ball chain are for pull cords on light fixtures and ceiling fans, keychains, and as retaining chains for things such as counter pens, and dogtag chains.

Typical width is size 3, or 2.4 mm, steel ball chain. In the jewelry industry, pure 925 sterling silver may be in 1 mm, 1.2 mm, 1.5 mm, 1.8 mm, and 2.2 mm ball chain.

The Mould effect is the counter-intuitive physical phenomenon ball chains exhibit when being pulled or poured out of a vessel, where the chain will rise above the lip of the vessel.
