= Chain fountain =

Physical phenomenon

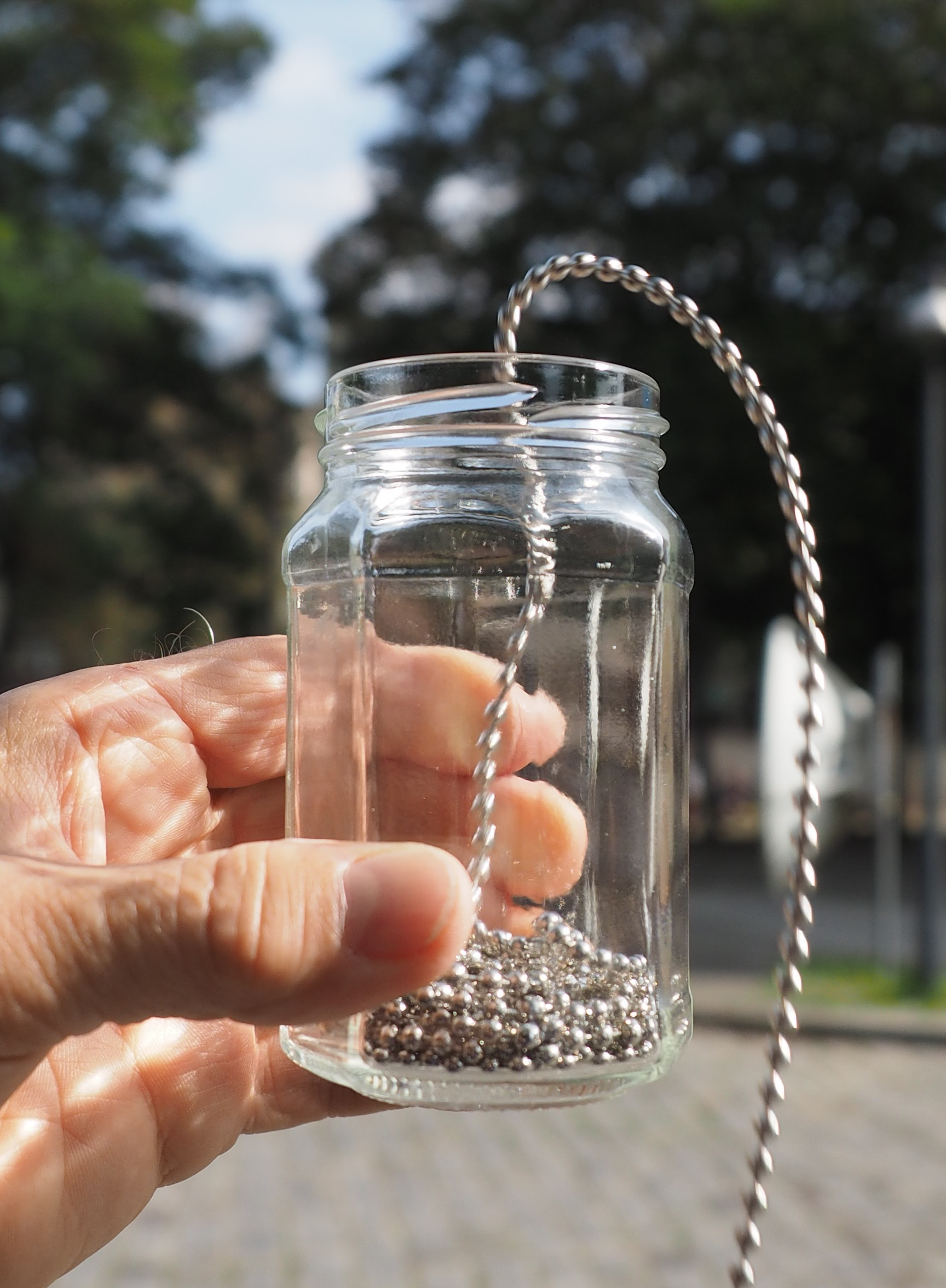
Snapshot of chain fountain process

The chain fountain phenomenon, also known as self-siphoning beads, Newton's beads, or the Mould effect, is a physical phenomenon observed with a chain placed inside a jar. One end of the chain is pulled from the jar and is allowed to fall under the influence of gravity. This process establishes a self-sustaining flow of the chain which rises over the edge and goes down to the floor or ground beneath it, as if being sucked out of the jar by an invisible siphon. For chains with small adjacent beads, the arc can ascend into the air over and above the edge of the jar with a noticeable gap; this gap is greater when the chain falls farther.

The self-siphoning effect is also observed in non-Newtonian fluids.

== History ==
The self-siphoning phenomenon has been known for some time, and had become a topic of public discussion many times in the past. Science entertainer Steve Spangler presented this phenomenon on TV in 2009, both with beads and viscoelastic liquids. This phenomenon is classically known as Newton's beads.

The effect is most pronounced when using a long ball chain. The higher the jar containing the chain is placed above the ground, the higher the chain will rise above the jar during the "siphoning" phase. As demonstrated in an experiment, when the jar is placed 30 metres (98 ft) above the ground and the chain is sufficiently long, the arc of the chain fountain can reach a height of about 2.1 m (6 ft 11 in) above the jar.

In 2011, the phenomenon with the rising chain was described as an open problem (Note: Statement of problem 3. String of beads: "A long string of beads is released from a beaker by pulling a sufficiently long part of the chain over the edge of the beaker. Due to gravity the speed of the string increases. At a certain moment the string no longer touches the edge of the beaker. Investigate and explain the phenomenon.")) for the 2012 International Young Physicists' Tournament (IYPT).

In 2013, science presenter Steve Mould brought the chain problem to widespread public attention. In a YouTube video, he demonstrated the phenomenon of self-siphoning rising beads, and he then presented his proposed explanation on a BBC show. This publicity caught the attention of academics John Biggins and Mark Warner of Cambridge University.

In 2014, Biggins and Warner published their findings on the problem in Proceedings of the Royal Society, regarding what they called the "chain fountain" or the "Mould effect".

In 2025, NASA astronaut Donald Pettit tested a bead chain in the zero gravity environment of the International Space Station to test Mould’s hypotheses about the phenomena.

== Explanation ==
Slow-motion video showing chain fountain dynamics.

A variety of explanations have been proposed as to how the phenomenon can best be explained in terms of kinematic physics concepts such as energy and momentum.

Biggins and Warner suggest that the origin of the upward force is related to the stiffness of the chain links, and the bending restrictions of each chain joint.

Furthermore, because the beads of the chain can drag laterally within the jar across other stationary links, the moving beads of the chain can bounce or jump vertically when they strike the immobile links. This effect contributes to the chain's movement, but is not the primary cause.

== In non-Newtonian fluids ==
The self-siphoning phenomenon can be also observed in viscoelastic fluids that are mainly composed of long polymers, like polyethylene glycol.

== See also ==
- Catenary

== Bibliography ==
- Biggins, John Simeon; Warner, Mark (2013-11-22). "Understanding the chain fountain". Proceedings of the Royal Society A: Mathematical, Physical and Engineering Sciences. 470 (2163). arXiv:1310.4056. Bibcode:2014RSPSA.47030689B. doi:10.1098/rspa.2013.0689.
- Mould, Steve (2013-02-20). "Self siphoning beads". Steve Mould's nerdy blog. Archived from the original on 2013-04-15.
