= Jack chain =

Type of chain

Two lengths of single-jack chain

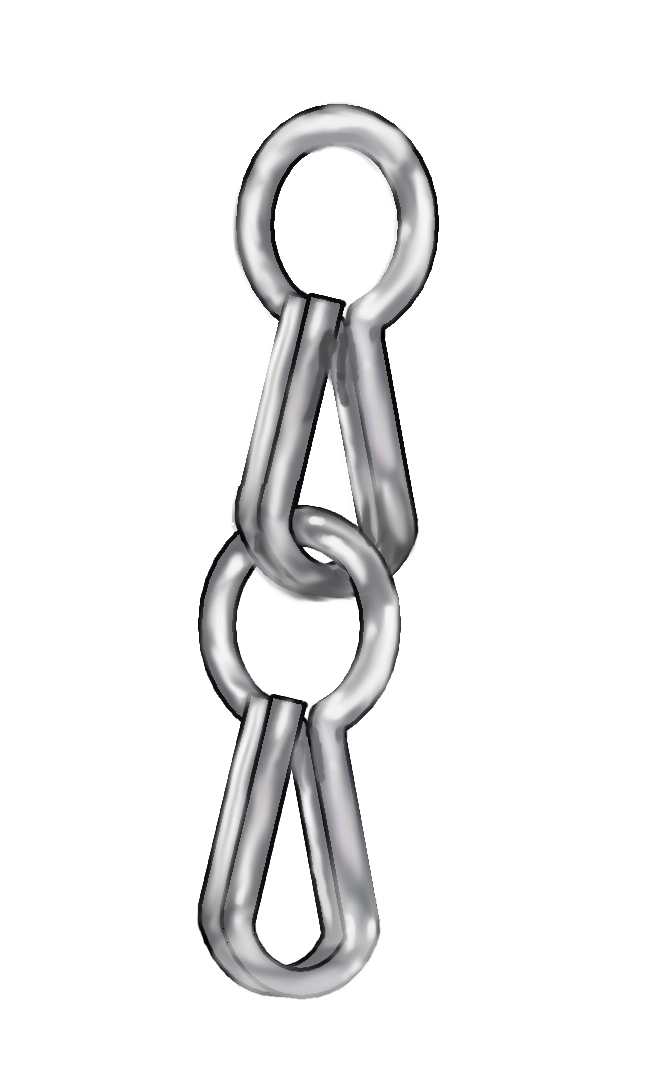
Two links of double-jack chain

A jack chain is a type of chain made of thin wire, with figure-eight-shaped links and loops at right angles to each other. Jack chains are often used to suspend fixtures such as lights or signs, for decorative purposes, or as part of a cable lock.

Jack chain may be manufactured as either single-jack chain or as double-jack chain. If double-jack, the lower loop is formed of two strands of wire rather than just one as in a single-jack.

Before the days of lavatory cisterns being close to the pan, jack chains were often used to release the cistern plug.

== Other meanings ==
A jack chain is a tool attached to a toothed chain for moving logs.
