= Lifting hook =

Device for lifting loads with a hoist or crane

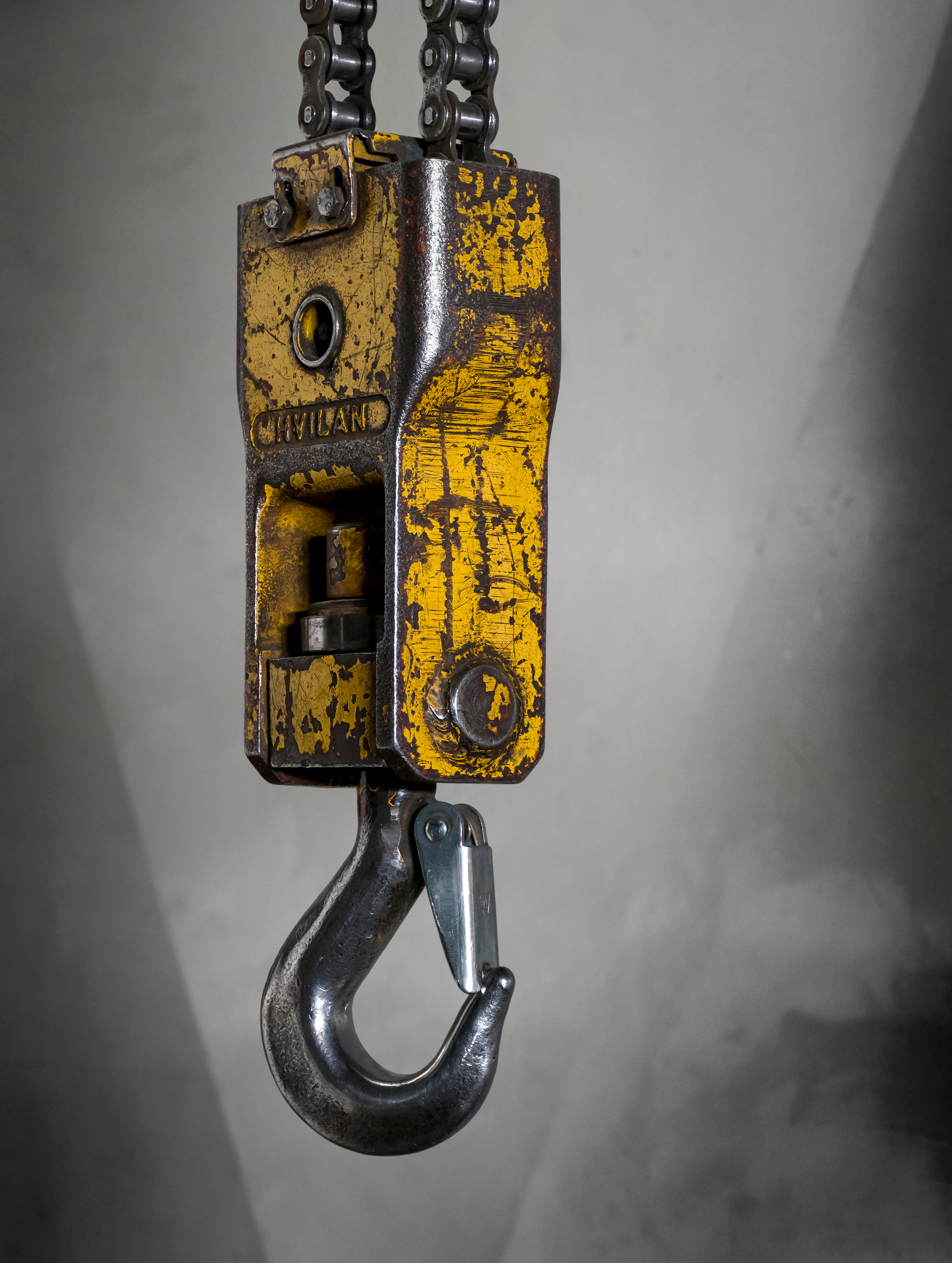
A lifting hook with a safety latch.

A lifting hook is a device for grabbing and lifting loads by means of a device such as a hoist or crane. A lifting hook is usually equipped with a safety latch to prevent the disengagement of the lifting wire rope sling, chain or rope to which the load is attached.

A hook may have one or more built-in pulley sheaves as a block and tackle to multiply the lifting force.

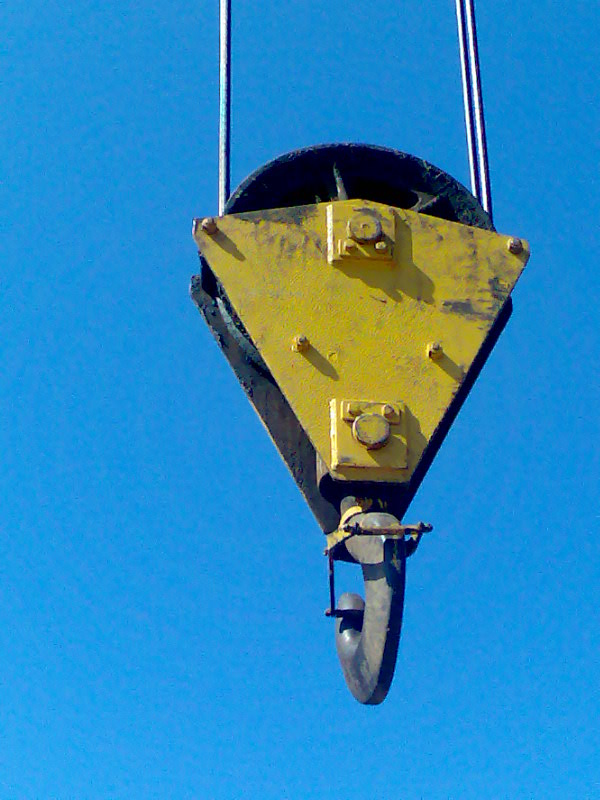
Lifting hook attached to sheave suspended by wire rope from boom of crane

== See also ==
- Hoist (device) – Device used for lifting or lowering a load
- Crane (machine) – Type of machine
- Wire rope – Metal rope
- Chain – Series of connected links which are typically made of metal
- Rope – Length of braided strands
