= Leaning Tower of Dallas =

Temporary Leaning Tower in Dallas

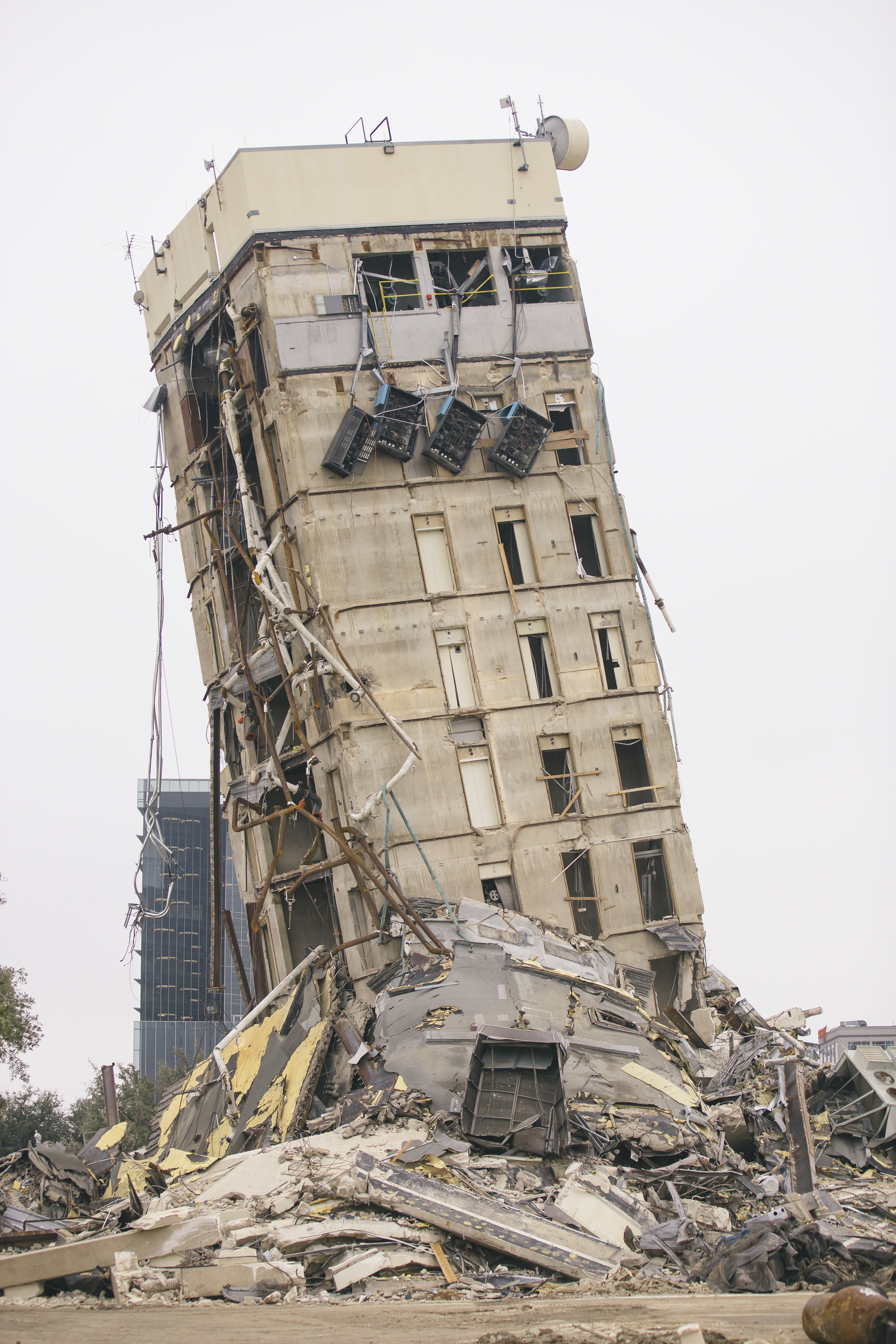
- Leaning Tower of Dallas in 2020

General information
- Type: Office
- Architectural style: Modernist
- Location: 2828 North Haskell Avenue, Dallas, Texas, United States
- Coordinates: 32°48′26.5″N 96°47′32.7″W
- Completed: 1971
- Demolished: March 2020

Height
- Height: 47.9 metres (157 ft)

Technical details
- Structural system: Reinforced concrete
- Floor count: 11

Design and construction
- Structural engineer: Datum Engineering

The Leaning Tower of Dallas was the core of an 11-story building in Dallas, Texas that unexpectedly remained standing and slightly leaning after the demolition of the building it was part of. On February 16, 2020, demolition was undertaken with dynamite to make way for a mixed-use project. The core remained standing until it was demolished via wrecking ball on March 3.

The building quickly became an internet meme and a social media hotspot for selfies. People traveled to Dallas from across Texas to take photos with the core akin to tourist photos taken with the Leaning Tower of Pisa.

== Background ==
The building was built in 1971 and was the Southland Corporation Office Tower. It later became the Affiliated Computer Services building until Xerox acquired them and then Xerox took ownership of it. The building was later acquired by De La Vega Development. It was a concrete office building located at 2828 North Haskell Avenue. It stood 11 stories tall and was 47.9m / 157 ft tall. Thomas Taylor, the principal design engineer, explained that the core did not collapse with the rest of the building because "[it had] a cast-in-place concrete core, we call it a slip-form concrete core. And that became the stabilizing element for the building. So it's sort of like the tree trunk of a tree. I mean, what came off is all the branches and the leaves. But the tree trunk is a little harder to bring down than the branches."

== Demolition ==
On February 16, 2020, Lloyd D. Nabors Demolition used 300 pounds of dynamite to demolish the building to make room for a mixed-use project. The entire building collapsed except the core which housed the elevator shaft and stairwell. The core collapsed slightly at its base before settling with a slight lean.

After the demolition, additional multistep plans were in place to bring down the rest of the building. Demolition crews planned to use a combination of a wrecking ball to destroy the upper portion of the core and a high-reach excavator to knock down the rest of it. On February 24, the second phase of demolition began. When the wrecking ball hit the building it appeared to do no damage at all. The wrecking ball was about 3.5 feet tall and weighed 5,600 pounds, giving it a tiny appearance in photos and videos as it swung into the building. Local journalists, observers and admirers made fun of the slow-moving process on social media. After two weeks of demolition on March 3, the core collapsed and demolition of the building was complete.

== Social media reaction ==
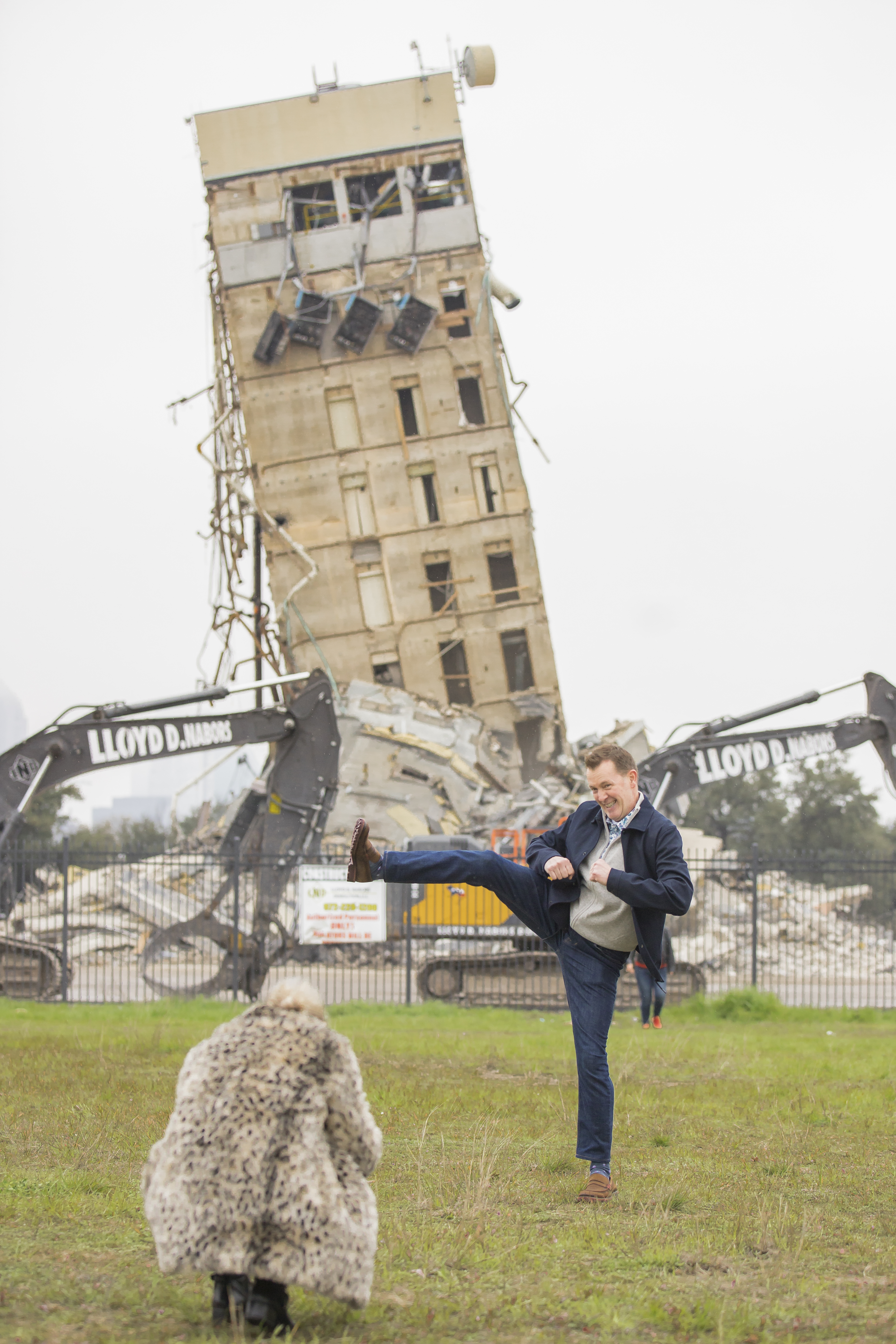
A man posing with the Leaning Tower of Dallas

Its height and location by downtown Dallas made it very visible to people living in the area and to commuters. People quickly noticed the awkward structure and started taking photos with it and posting them on social media. Inspired by Italy's Leaning Tower of Pisa, many people posted photos of themselves pretending to hold up the tilted tower. Numerous memes were created and posted on various social media outlets about the tower, including on Facebook, Instagram, and Twitter. Many memes made light of the tower's refusal to fall despite the demolition attempts.
