= Lariat chain =

Science demonstration

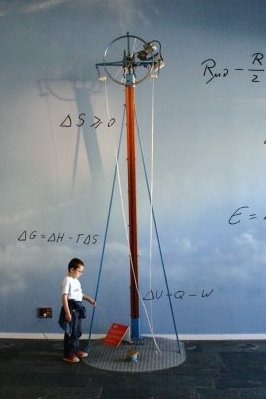
A lariat chain at the Museu de la Ciencia (science museum), in Barcelona, Spain.

A lariat chain is a loop of chain that hangs off, and is spun by, a wheel. It is often used as a science exhibit or a toy.

The original lariat chain was created in 1986 by Norman Tuck, as an artist-in-residence project at the Exploratorium in San Francisco.

The lariat chain was developed from an earlier Tuck piece entitled Chain Reaction (1984). Chain Reaction was hand-cranked, and used a heavy chain attached by magnets to an iron flywheel. As in the lariat chain, Chain Reaction used a brush to disrupt the motion of the traveling chain.

The speed of the chain is arranged to equal the wave speed of transverse waves, so that waves moving against the motion of the chain appear to be standing still.

== See also ==
- Belt (mechanical)
- Foucault pendulum
- Launch loop has similar potential instabilities
