= Flat chain =

Widely-defunct mechanical chain type

Flat chain is a form of chain used chiefly in agricultural machinery. Early machinery made extensive use of flat chain. It has been gradually replaced in most applications by roller chain, which is quieter, lasts longer, and requires less frequent retensioning.

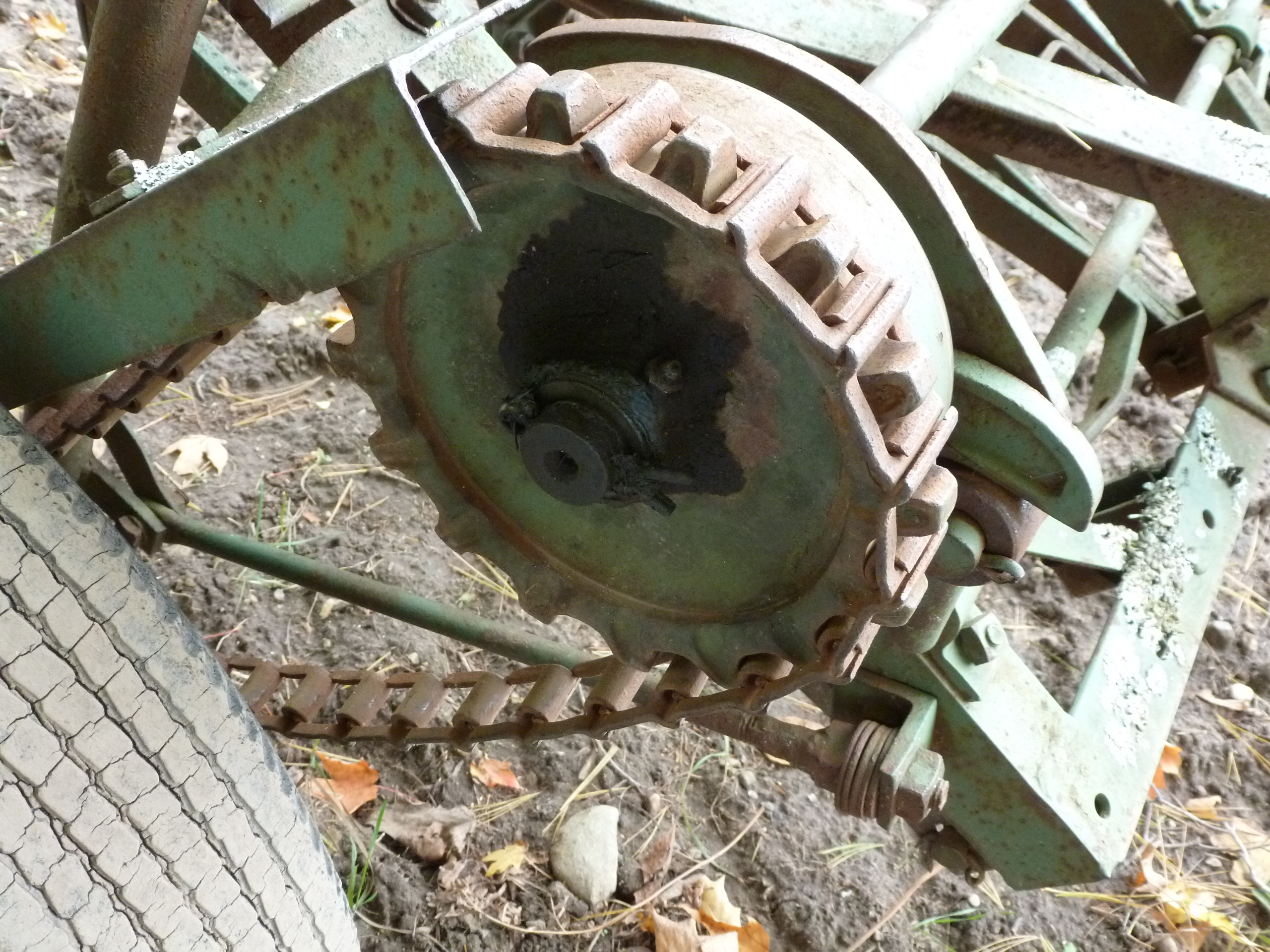
Drive chain on a ground-drive/wheel-driven field cultivator (harrow)

Modern flat chain is made from stamped steel. Individual links can be put together or taken apart using simple tools, unlike roller chain which requires a master link or special splicing equipment.

Today, flat chain is used most often for conveyor belts, because it lends itself well to the attachment of slats, flights, buckets, and prongs used to move material. Such attachments can be welded on in the field, or can be purchased ready-made on a single link (or pair of links where the conveyor uses two chains) and then spliced into a loop of chain.

Older forms of flat chain were made of iron. Though the sprockets are compatible with modern chain, the two types cannot be spliced together.
