= Project Starlight (UCSB) =

UCSB study of fleet of small laser light sail interstellar probes

Project Starlight is a research project of the University of California, Santa Barbara to develop a fleet of laser beam-propelled interstellar probes and sending them to a star neighboring the Solar System, potentially Alpha Centauri. The project aims to send organisms on board the probe.

== Overview ==
Starlight aims to accelerate the spacecraft with powerful lasers, a method the project refers to as DEEP-IN (Directed Energy Propulsion for Interstellar Exploration), thus allowing them to reach stars near the Solar System in a matter of years, in contrast to traditional propulsion methods which would require thousands of years. Each spacecraft would be the size of a DVD disc and would be powered by plutonium. They would fly at one-fifth of the speed of light, and in the case of Alpha Centauri, they would arrive after traveling more than twenty years from Earth.

== History ==
Starlight is a program of the Experimental Cosmology Group of University of California, Santa Barbara (UCSB), and has received funding from NASA. In 2015, the NASA Innovative Advanced Concepts (NIAC) selected DEEP-IN as a phase-1 project.

== Terrestrial biomes in space ==
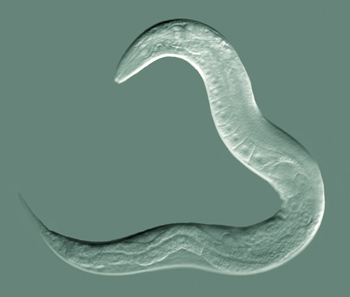
Sent onboard Starlight, C. elegans may become the first terrestrial organism to reach Alpha Centauri

One goal of Starlight is to send terrestrial organisms along with the spacecraft, and observe how the interstellar environment and extreme acceleration affects them. This effort is known as Terrestrial Biomes in Space, and the lead candidate is Caenorhabditis elegans, a minuscule nematode. The organism will spend most of the voyage in a frozen state, and once the spacecraft approaches its target they will be thawed by heat from the onboard plutonium. Following their revival, the organisms will be monitored by various sensors, and the data they produce will be sent back to Earth. C. elegans have been used extensively in biological research as a model organism, as the worm is one of those having the fewest cells for an animal possessing a nervous system. A backup option for C. elegans are tardigrades, micro-animals that are known for their resilience to various conditions lethal to other animals, such as the vacuum environment of space and strong doses of ionizing radiation.

=== Planetary protection ===
NASA's funding does not cover the Terrestrial Biome in Space portion of Starlight, as the experiment may potentially contaminate exoplanets.

== See also ==
- Breakthrough Starshot – Interstellar probe project, a similar initiative to Starlight
- Interstellar probe
- Interstellar travel
- 2069 Alpha Centauri mission – NASA concept for uncrewed probe - possibly a light sail, proposed in 2016 for NASA
