= Daedalus (crater) =

Crater on the Moon

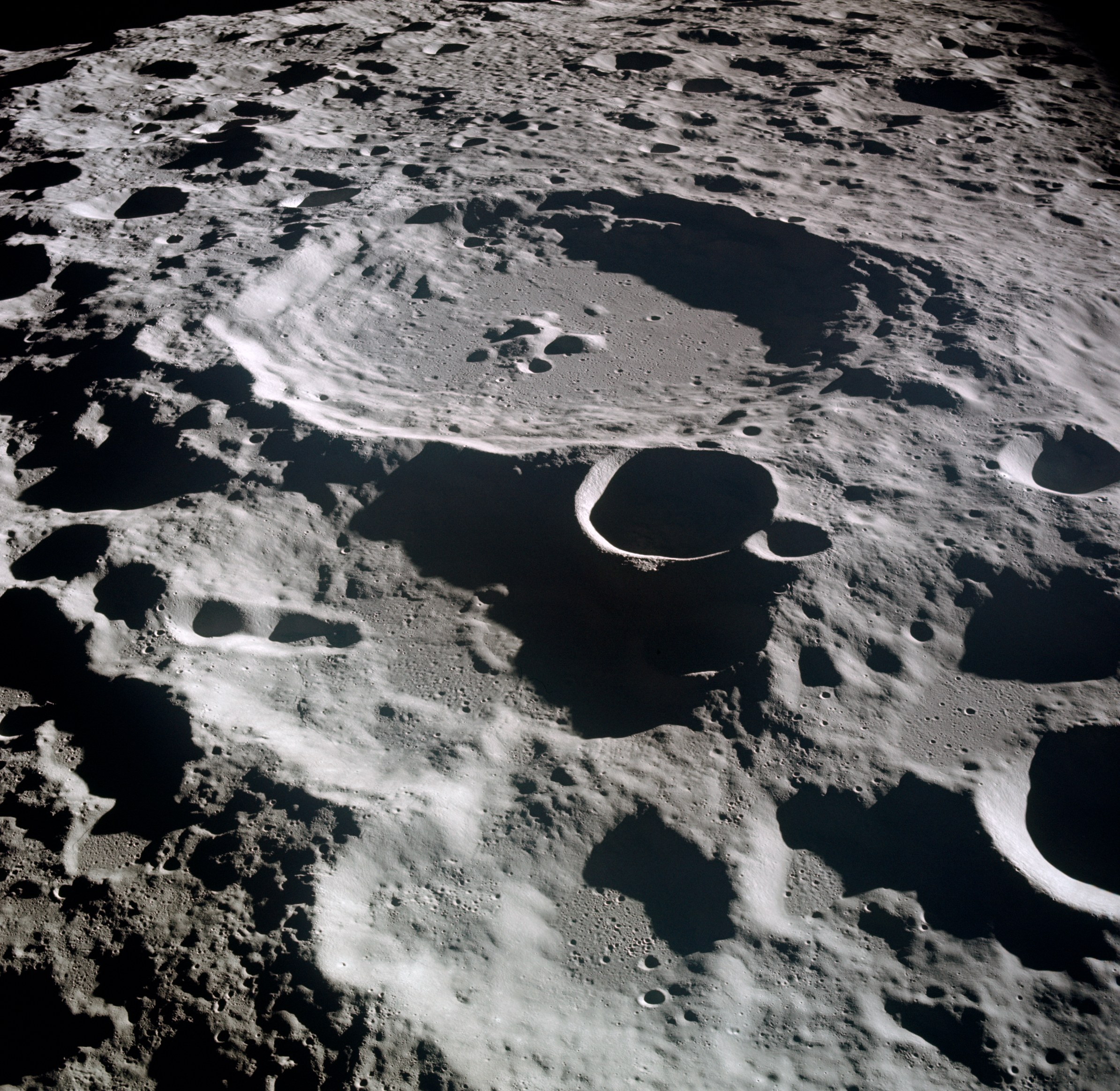
- Looking southward toward the lunar farside crater Daedalus, from Apollo 11 (NASA photo)
- Coordinates: 5.9°S 179.4°E
- Diameter: 93.61 km (58.17 mi)
- Depth: 3.0 km (1.9 mi)
- Colongitude: 181° at sunrise
- Formation: Early Imbrian
- Eponym: Daedalus

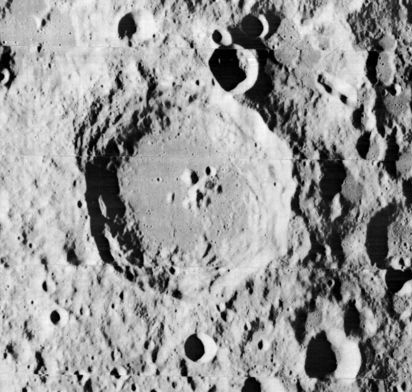
Lunar Orbiter 2 image

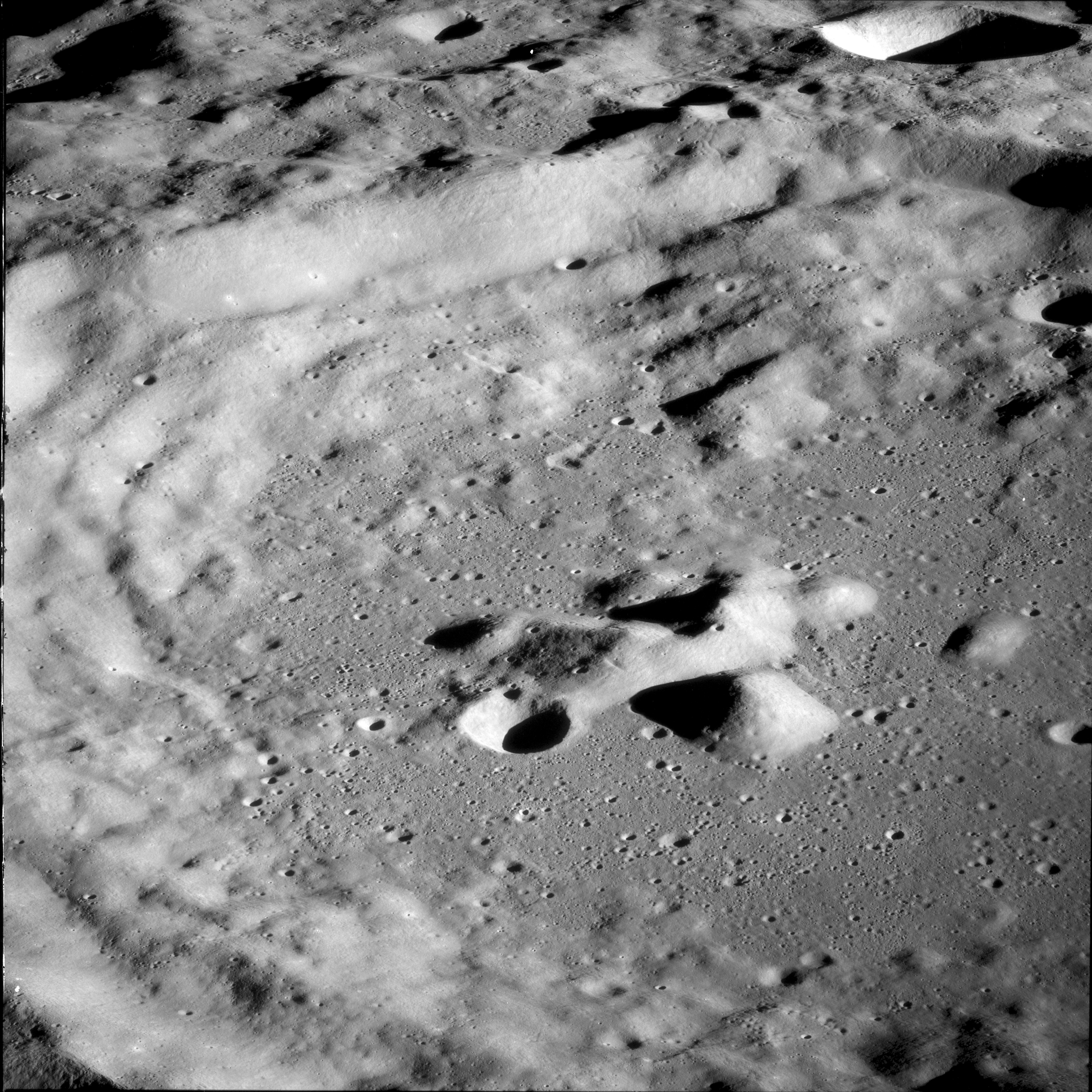
Closeup of the interior from Apollo 11

Daedalus is a prominent crater located near the center of the far side of the Moon, close to the antipode from the Earth. It has a diameter of 94 km. Nearby craters of note include Icarus to the east and Racah to the south. Less than a crater diameter to the north-northeast is Lipskiy.

This formation dates to the Early Imbrian epoch of the lunar geologic timescale. It is a well-formed impact feature that has not undergone significant degradation due to subsequent impacts. The inner wall is terraced, and there is a cluster of central peaks on the relatively flat floor. The infrared spectrum of pure crystalline plagioclase has been identified on the central peaks. The smaller crater Daedalus B is attached to the north northeastern rim.

Because its location is shielded from radio emissions from the Earth, it has been proposed as the site of a future giant radio telescope. This would be scooped out of the crater itself, much like the Arecibo radio telescope, but on a vastly larger scale.

The crater is named after Daedalus, the father of Icarus in Greek mythology. It is famously pictured in photographs taken by the Apollo 11 astronauts. In contemporary sources it was called Crater 308, and this was a temporary IAU designation that preceded the establishment of far-side lunar nomenclature. Its modern designation was formally adopted by the International Astronomical Union in 1970.

== Satellite craters ==
By convention these features are identified on lunar maps by placing the letter on the side of the crater midpoint that is closest to Daedalus.

Daedalus	Latitude	Longitude	Diameter
B	4.1° S	179.8° W	23 km
C	4.1° S	178.9° W	68 km
G	6.6° S	177.4° W	33 km
K	8.3° S	178.5° W	24 km
M	8.1° S	179.5° E	13 km
R	7.7° S	175.2° E	41 km
S	6.8° S	172.9° E	20 km
U	4.2° S	174.9° E	30 km
W	3.5° S	177.5° E	70 km

On the lunar geologic timescale, Daedalus U is a degraded crater that dates from the Nectarian period.

== See also ==
- 1864 Daedalus, near-Earth asteroid
- Lunar Crater Radio Telescope - proposed radio telescope by NIAC for the far side of the moon
