= 2069 Alpha Centauri mission =

NASA concept for uncrewed probe - possibly a light sail

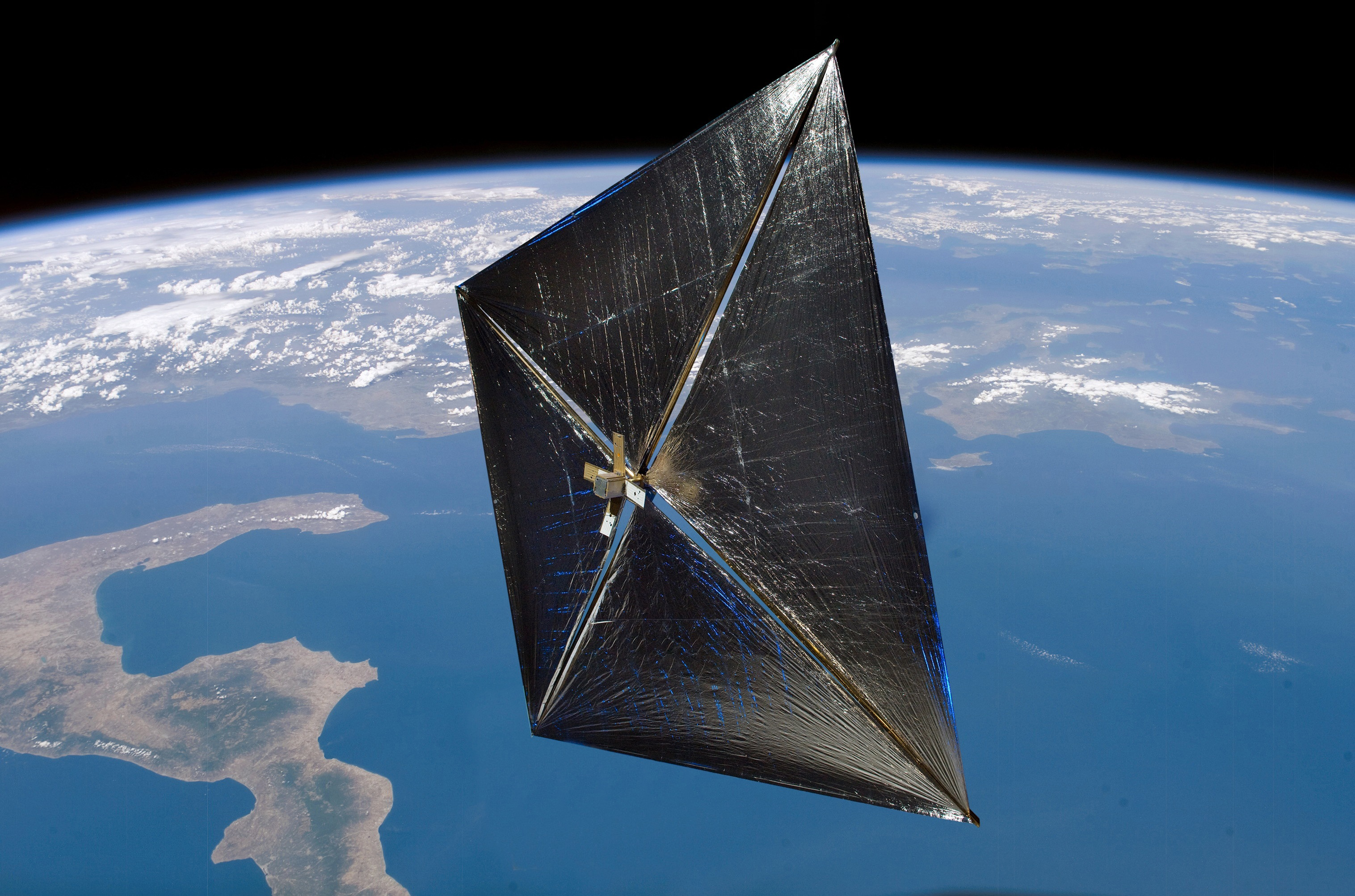
An artist's depiction of a solar sail.

The 2069 Alpha Centauri mission is a NASA interstellar probe mission concept.

In December 2017, NASA released a mission concept involving the launch, in 2069, of an interstellar probe to search for signs of life on planets orbiting stars in and around the Alpha Centauri system. The announcement was at the annual conference of the American Geophysical Union. The mission (proposed in May 2016) remains a concept, and as such, has no name or allocated funding.

A preliminary mission outline suggests the use of solar sails propelled by high energy lasers to increase propulsion. The proposed launch would be on the 100th anniversary of the Apollo 11 mission. The spacecraft would reach Alpha Centauri by the year 2113, 44 years after its launch travelling at 10% of the speed of light.

== See also ==
- Breakthrough Starshot – Interstellar probe project, private project proposed April 2016
- Project Starlight (UCSB) – UCSB study of fleet of small laser light sail interstellar probes
- Project Longshot – Spacecraft design
- Fermi Explorer – Proposed interstellar mission
