= Diffractive solar sail =

Type of solar sail

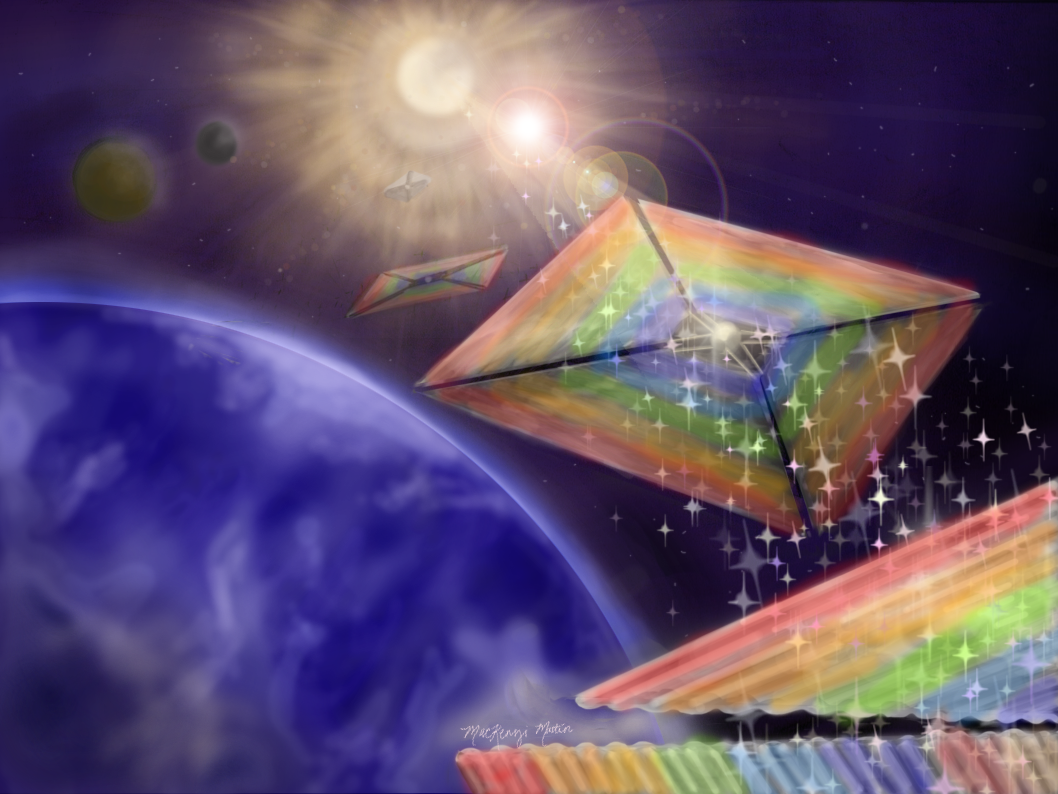
Concept art for a diffractive lightsail

A diffractive solar sail, or diffractive lightsail, is a type of solar sail which relies on diffraction instead of reflection for its propulsion. Current diffractive sail designs use thin metamaterial films, containing micrometer-size gratings based on polarization or subwavelength refractive structures, causing light to spread out (i.e. diffract) and thereby exert radiation pressure when it passes through them.

== History ==
The idea of using diffraction for a solar sail was first proposed in 2017 by researchers at the Rochester Institute of Technology. This was enabled in part by advances in material design and fabrication (particularly of gratings), and optoelectronic control. In 2019 a diffractive solar sail project from the Rochester Institute of Technology suggested a solar polar orbit mission with diffractive sails that could reach a higher solar inclination angle and smaller orbital radius than one with reflective sails, reaching NASA's NIAC phase II. In 2022 the NIAC project reached phase III and gained US$2 million of support from NASA, with involvement of researchers from both Johns Hopkins University and the Rochester Institute of Technology.

== Advantages over reflective sails ==
Reflective solar sail designs tend to consist of large, thin reflective sheets. By the law of reflection, the forces acting on them will always be normal to the sheet surface; the sheets must therefore be tilted during navigation, which poses structure and control challenges, and reduces the power reaching the sail. These in turn can lower reliability, increase mass, and reduce acceleration. Furthermore, reflective sails tend to absorb a reasonable proportion of the light hitting them, causing them to heat up; this can cause structural problems, particularly when the sail is repeatedly heated and then allowed to cool. Also, each photon hitting the sail is used once, i.e. it's either reflected or absorbed.

On the other hand, in a diffractive sail the grating can redirect light even when the sheet directly faces the sun, allowing much more efficient control with maximum power hitting the sail. The diffractive film can be designed to allow for optoelectronic control of the gratings, thereby reducing mass and increasing reliability relative to mechanical control. Since the film is translucent, most of the light just passes through the sail, reducing overall heating. Photons can be reused: either by passing through a second diffraction grating for more thrust, or by going to a solar cell to provide electricity.
