= Lunar Crater Radio Telescope =

Proposed radio telescope

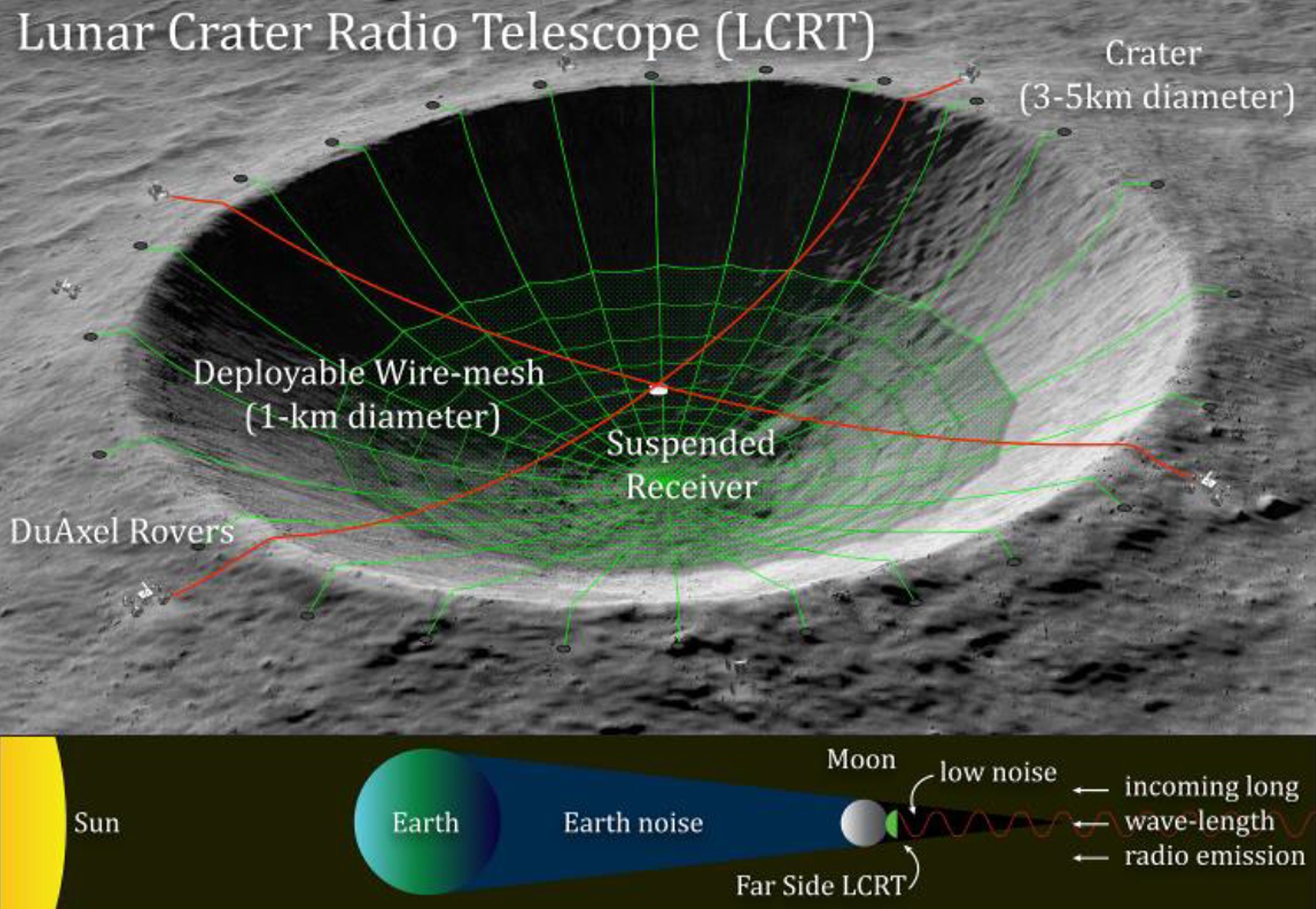
- Alternative names: LCRT
- Location(s): far side of the Moon
- Diameter: 1,000 m (3,280 ft 10 in)

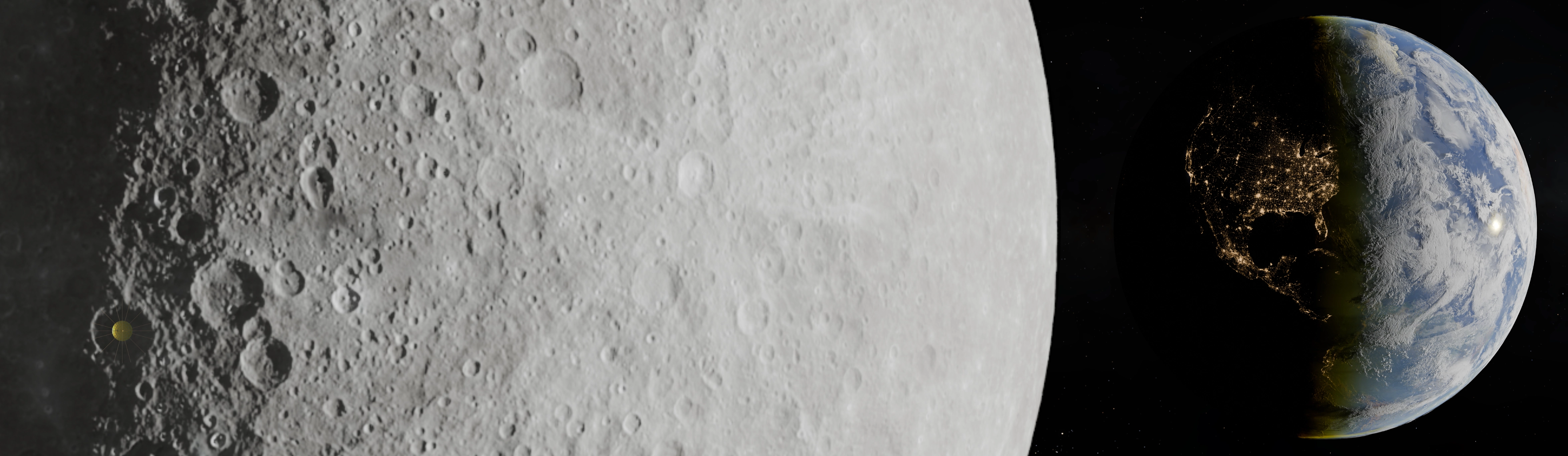
Lunar Crater Radio Telescope 3D conceptual design

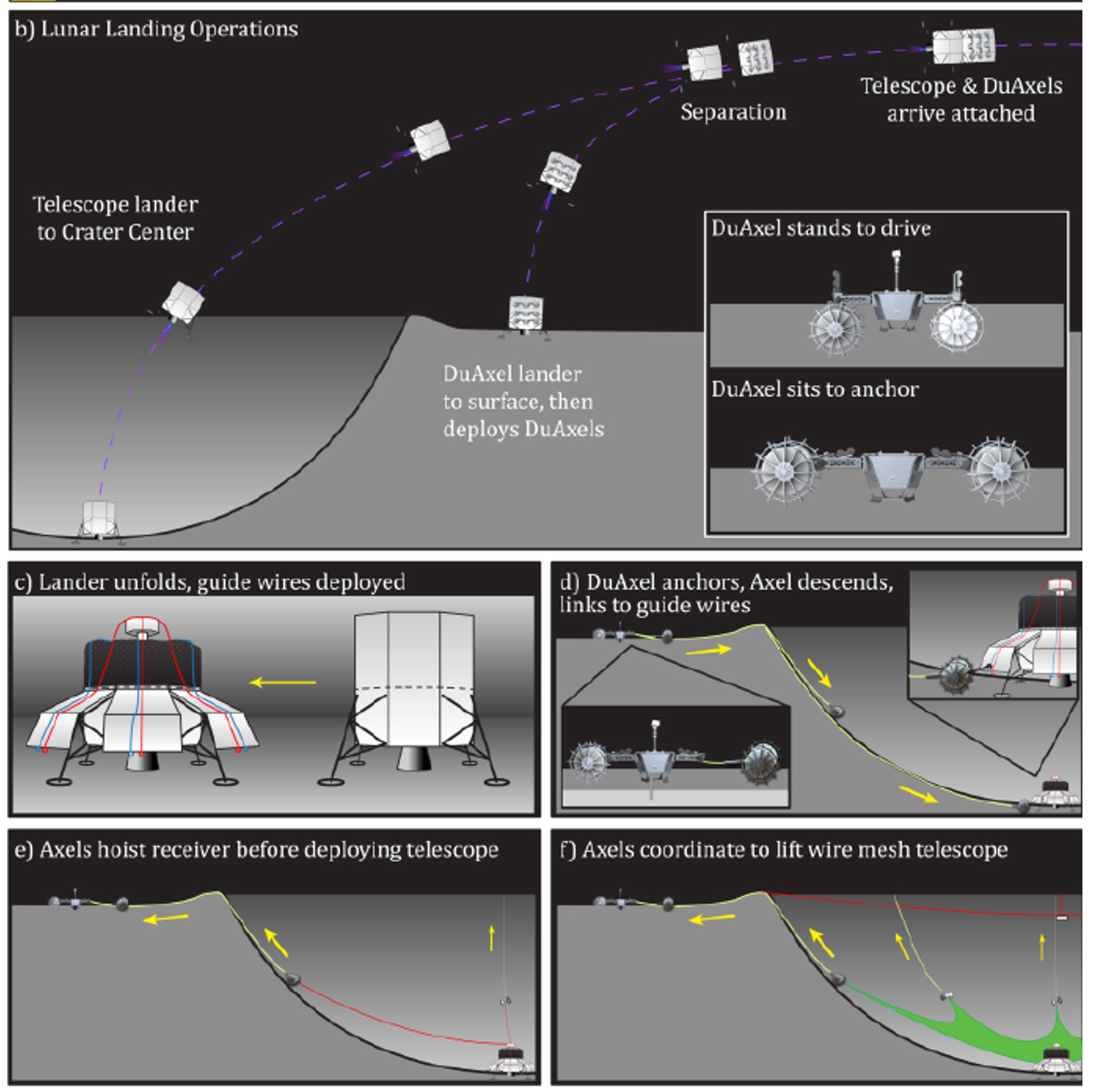
Concept of operations for building LCRT

The Lunar Crater Radio Telescope (LCRT) is a proposal by the NASA Institute for Advanced Concepts (NIAC) to create an ultra-long-wavelength (that is, wavelengths greater than 10 m, corresponding to frequencies below 30 MHz) radio telescope inside a lunar crater on the far side of the Moon. (Note: Radio telescopes on Earth can not probe the long-wavelength radio waves from the universe's Dark Ages, as the ionosphere reflect them through its layer of ions and electrons.)

The reason for building the LCRT on the far side of the Moon would be to avoid interference faced by radio telescopes on the Earth's surface. The Moon would block many sources of radio interference originating on Earth, and would avoid the problems that come from Earth's ionosphere at long radio wavelengths.

If completed, the telescope would have a structural diameter of 1.3 km, and the reflector would be 350m in diameter. Robotic lift wires and an anchoring system would enable origami deployment of the parabolic reflector.

== History ==
A previous proposal put the reflector size at 1 km diameter. In 2021, the LCRT project went into phase II of development in the NIAC program and was awarded $500,000 to continue work. As of 2023, work on the lunar crater radio telescope is ongoing at Caltech/NASA Jet Propulsion Laboratory.

== Construction ==
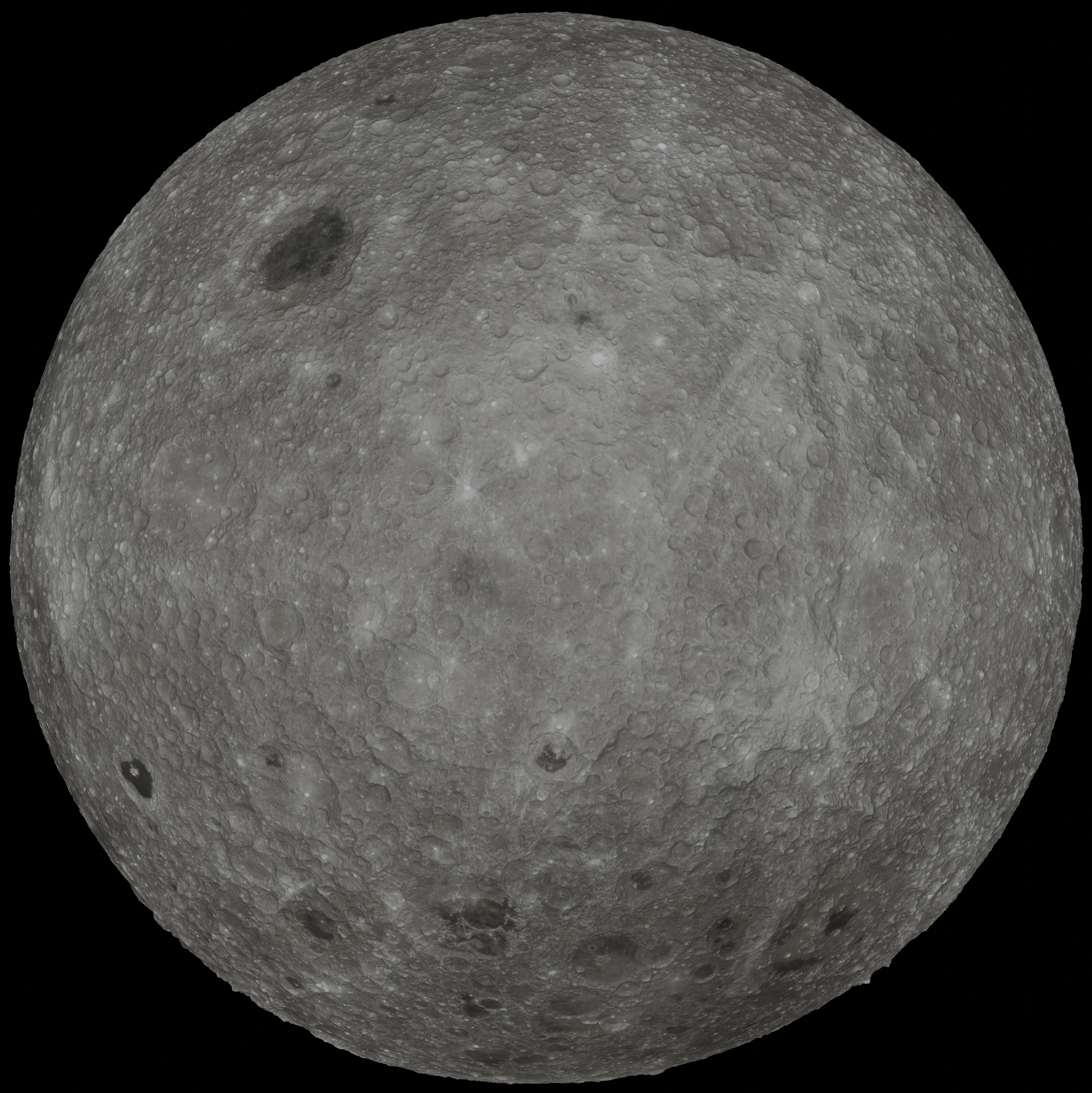
Far side of the Moon, rendered with Blender with data from NASA.

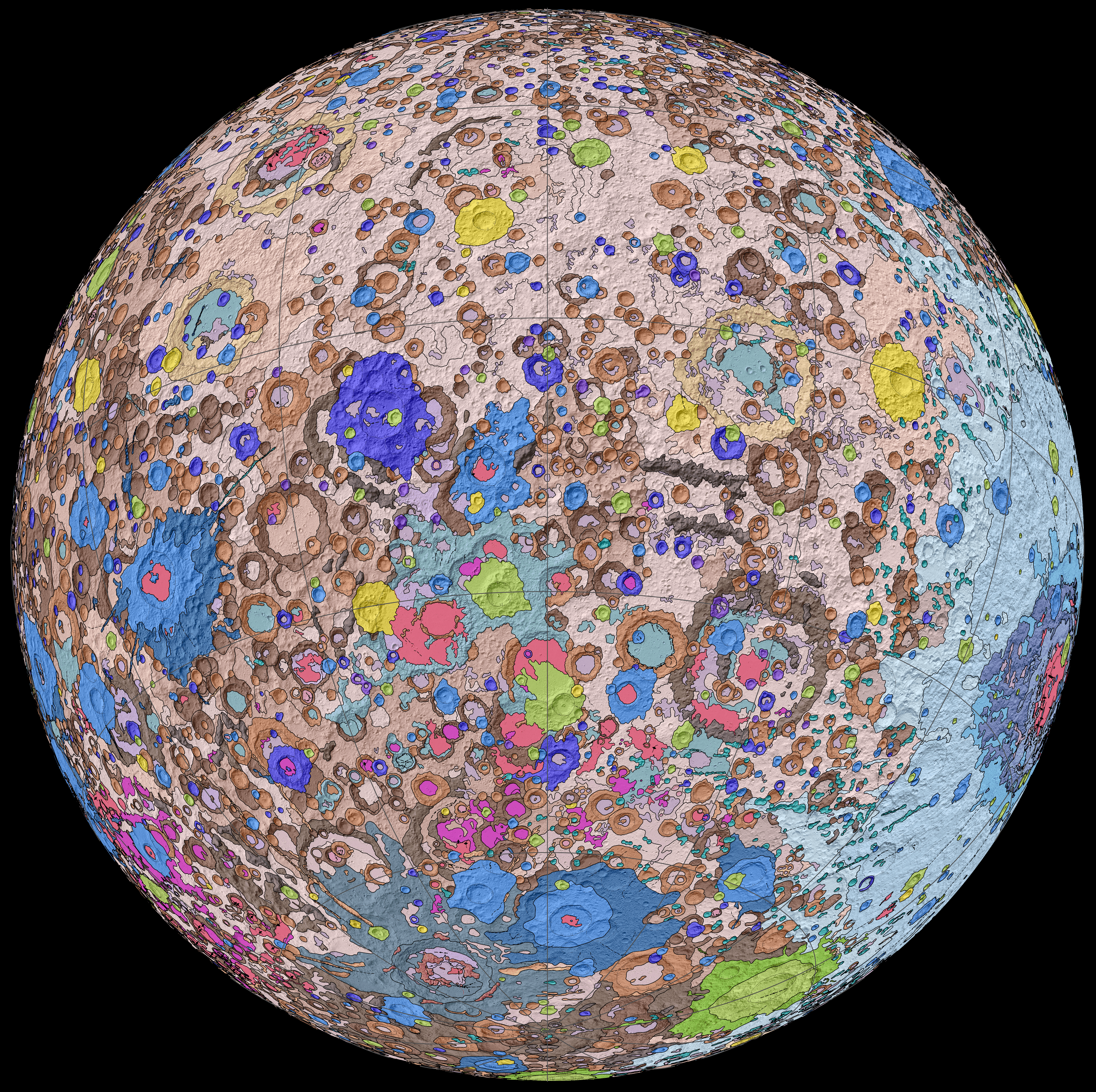
Topographic map of the far side of the Moon with the Lunar south pole at the bottom.

To be sensitive to long radio wavelengths, the LCRT would need to be huge. The idea is to create an antenna over half-a-mile (1 kilometer) wide in a crater over 3 kilometers (2 miles) wide. The biggest single-dish radio telescopes on Earth – like the Five-hundred-meter Aperture Spherical Telescope (FAST) in China and the now-inoperative 305-meter-wide Arecibo Observatory in Puerto Rico – were built inside natural bowl-like depressions in the landscape to provide a support structure.

This class of radio telescope uses thousands of reflecting panels suspended inside the depression to make the entire dish’s surface reflective to radio waves. The receiver then hangs via a system of cables at a focal point over the dish, anchored by towers at the dish’s perimeter, to measure the radio waves bouncing off the curved surface below. But despite its size and complexity, even FAST is not sensitive to radio wavelengths longer than about 14 feet (4.3 meters).

The LCRT concept eliminates the need to transport prohibitively heavy material to the Moon and utilizes robots to automate the construction process. Instead of using thousands of reflective panels to focus incoming radio waves, the LCRT would be made of thin wire mesh in the center of the crater. One spacecraft would deliver the mesh, and a separate lander would deposit DuAxel rovers to build the dish over several days or weeks.

DuAxel, a robotic concept being developed at JPL, is composed of two single-axle rovers (called Axel) that can undock from each other but stay connected via a tether. One half would act as an anchor at the rim of the crater as the other rappels down to do the building.

Another concept, that reduces both cost and complexity by almost half, is using a Lift Wire Deployment and Anchoring System for LCRT, as shown in picture.

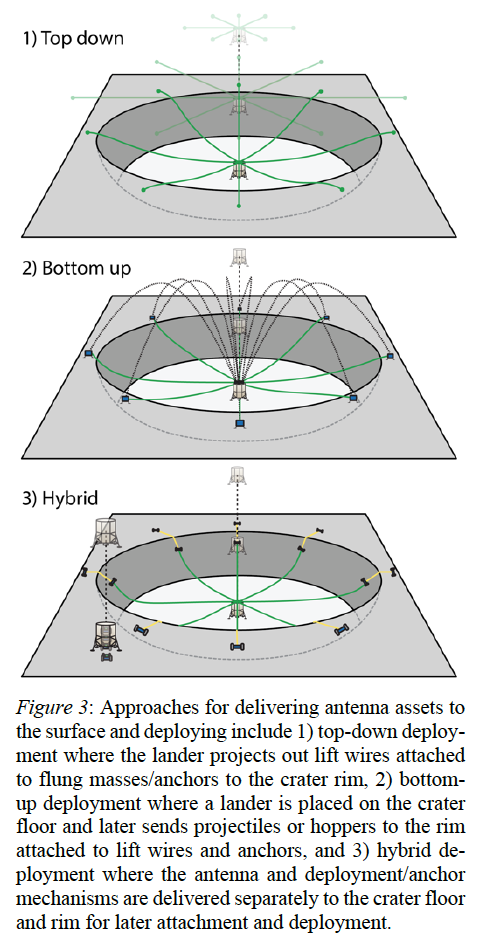
Lift Wire Deployment and Anchoring System for LCRT.

== See also ==
- List of craters on the far side of the moon
- Daedalus (crater) - located near the center of the far side of the moon

== Bibliography ==
- Bandyopadhyay, Saptarshi (2020-09-30). "Lunar Crater Radio Telescope (LCRT) on the Far-Side of the Moon". YouTube.
