= Racah (crater) =

Crater on the Moon

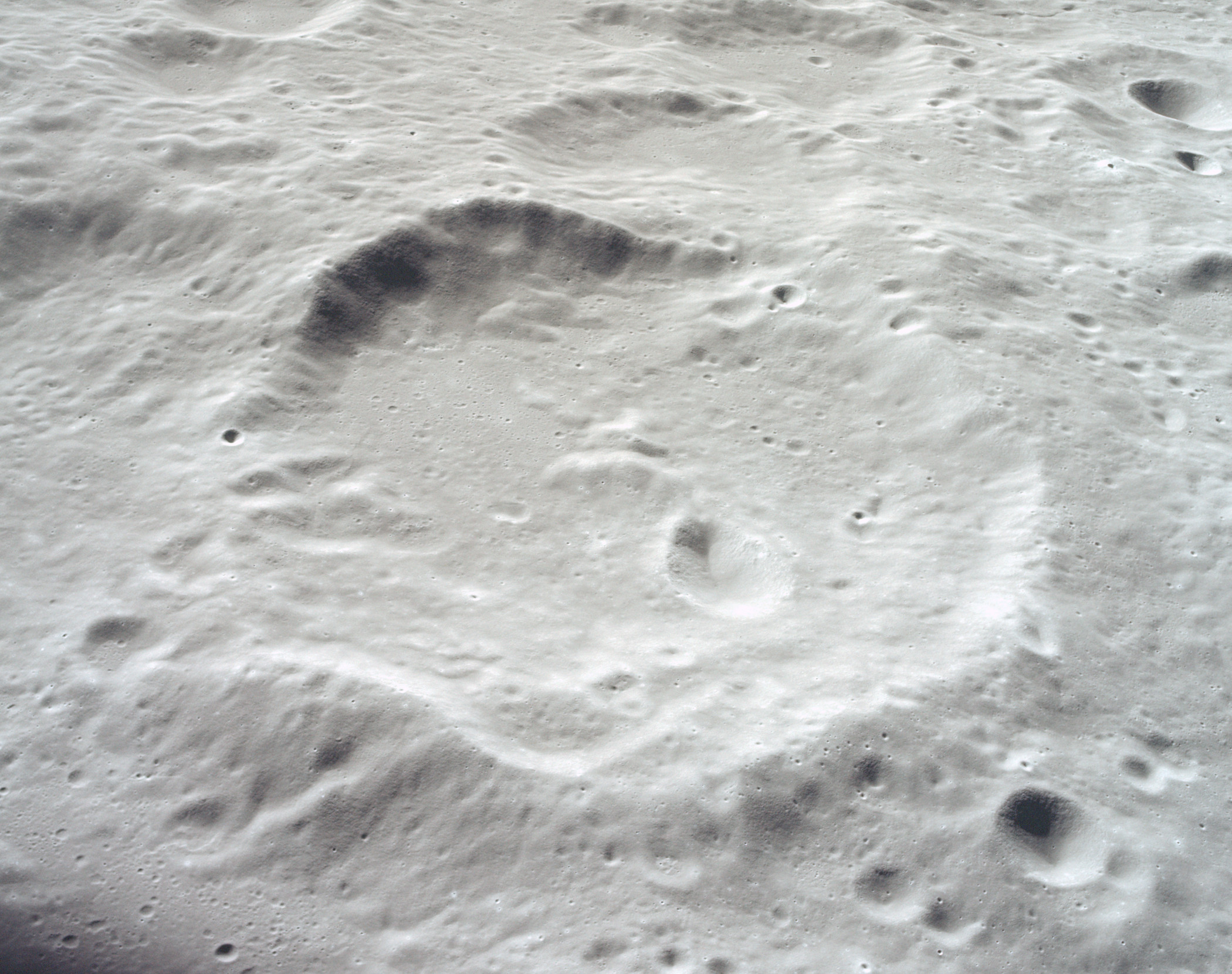
- Oblique Apollo 17 image
- Coordinates: 13.8°S 179.8°W
- Diameter: 63 km
- Depth: Unknown
- Colongitude: 180° at sunrise
- Eponym: Giulio Racah

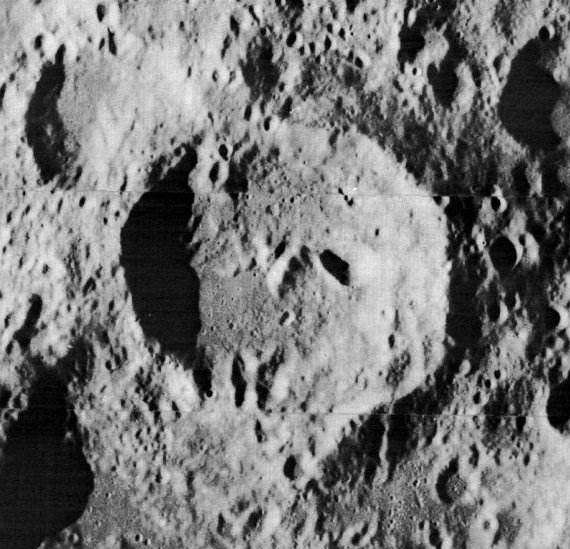
Lunar Orbiter 2 image

Racah is a degraded lunar impact crater on the far side of the Moon. It lies almost due south of the larger crater Daedalus, and crosses lunar longitude 180° W, i.e. the longitude that is diametrically opposite to the Earth. To the west-southwest of Racah is the crater Aitken, and to the southeast lies De Vries.

The rim of this crater is eroded and is not quite circular, having a prominent outward bulge along the west-northwest side. The edge is somewhat damaged along the southern rim, but no significant craters lie along the side. The interior floor is uneven in places with some small impacts.

This feature is named after the Israeli physicist Giulio Racah.

== Satellite craters ==
By convention these features are identified on lunar maps by placing the letter on the side of the crater midpoint that is closest to Racah.

Racah	Latitude	Longitude	Diameter
B	10.5° S	178.4° W	27 km
J	16.5° S	177.4° W	37 km
K	16.8° S	178.6° W	52 km
N	17.0° S	179.0° E	35 km
T	13.8° S	177.5° E	21 km
U	13.2° S	177.2° E	25 km
W	12.5° S	178.9° E	39 km
X	10.2° S	179.0° E	14 km
