= Giulio Racah =

Italian–Israeli physicist and mathematician (1909–1965)

- ג'וליו רקח
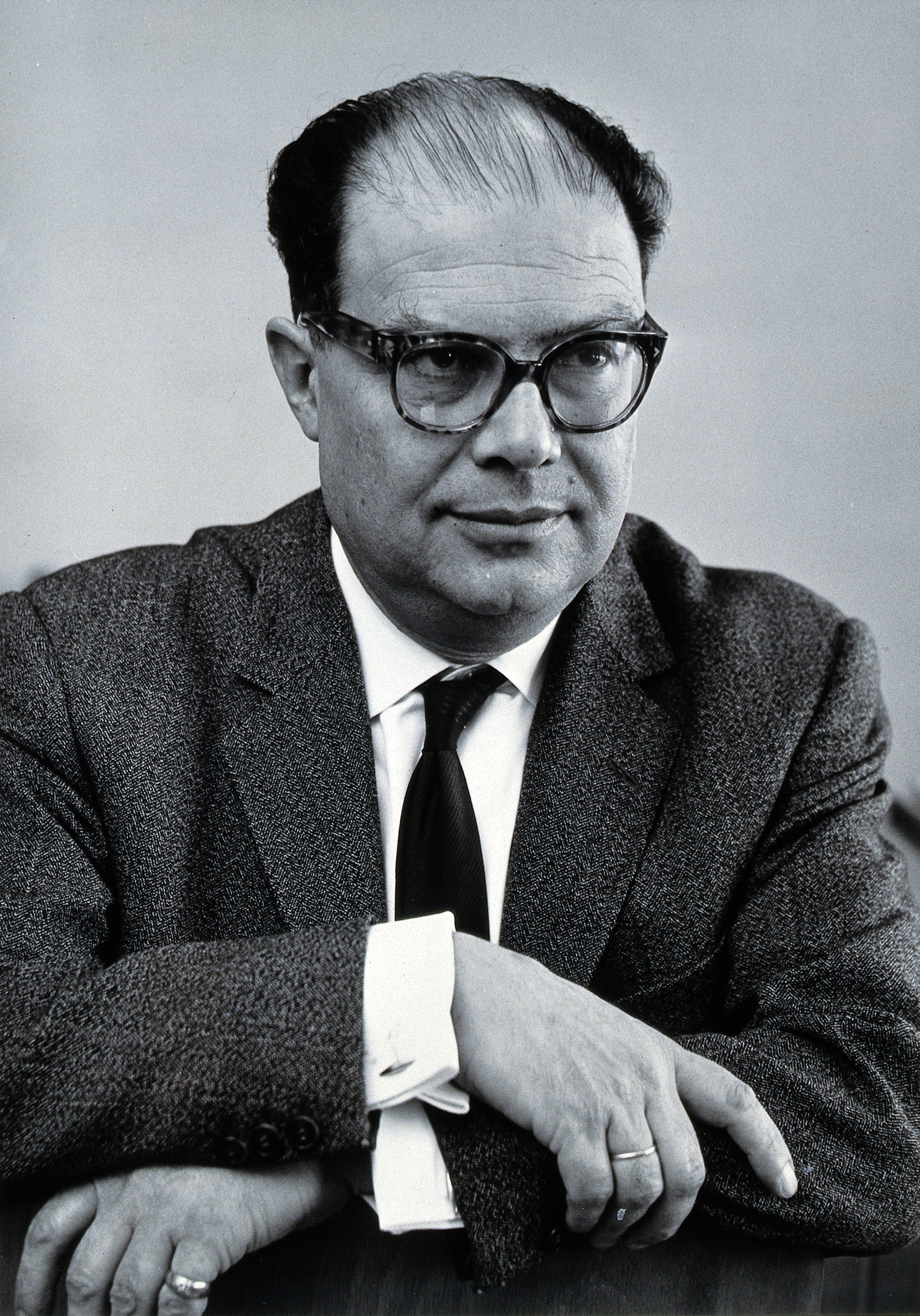
- Born: February 9, 1909; Florence, Italy
- Died: August 28, 1965 (aged 56); Florence, Italy
- Awards: Weizmann Prize (1953)

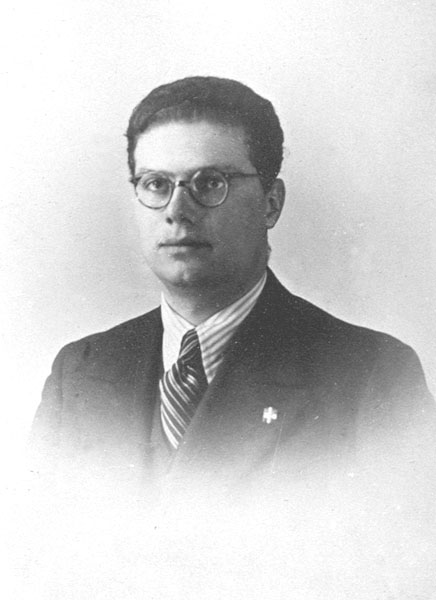
Giulio Racah

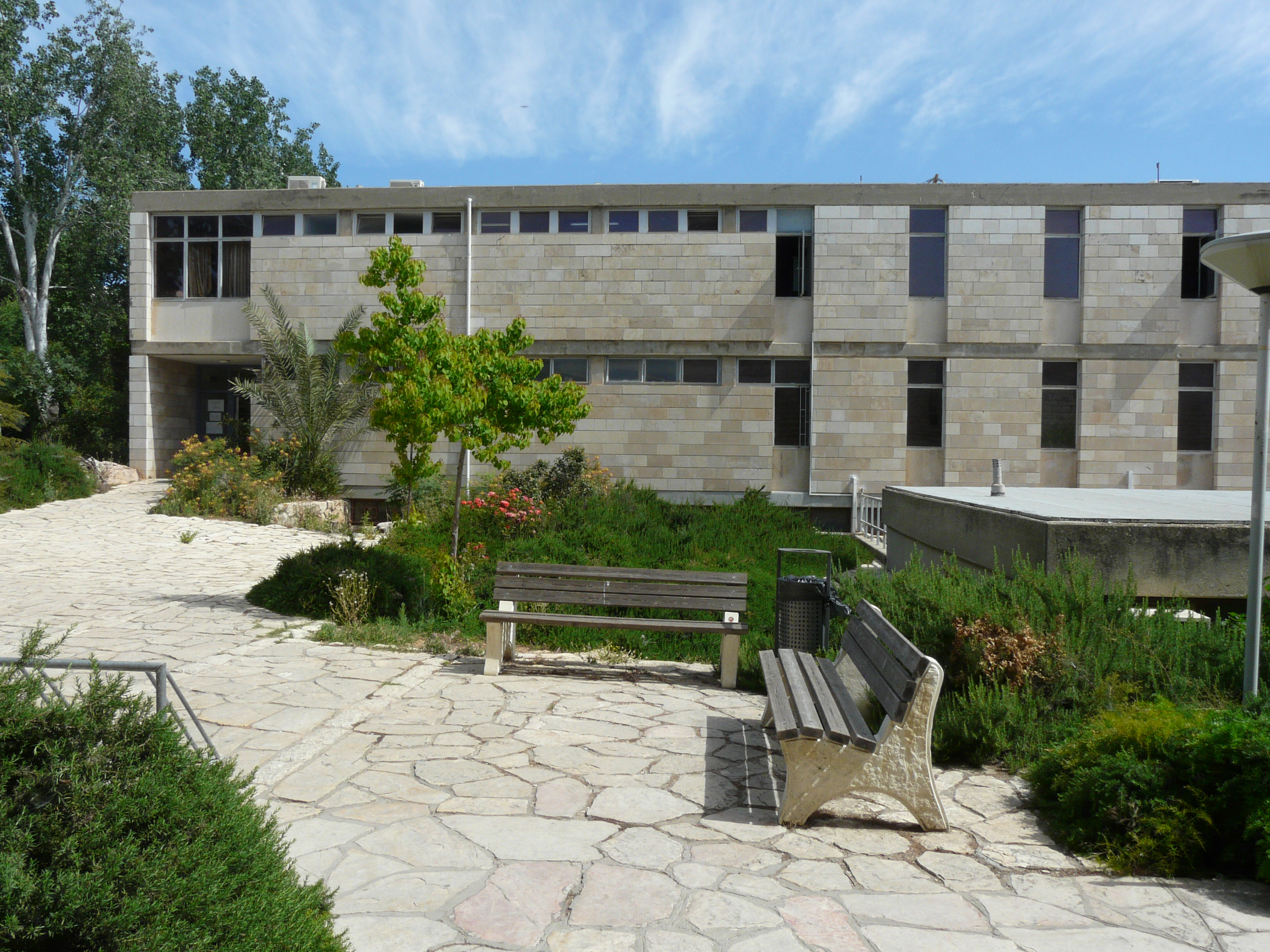
The Racah Institute of Physics at the Hebrew University Givat Ram campus in Jerusalem

Giulio (Yoel) Racah (Hebrew: ג'וליו (יואל) רקח; February 9, 1909 – August 28, 1965) was an Italian–Israeli physicist and mathematician. He was Acting President of the Hebrew University of Jerusalem from 1961 to 1962.

The crater Racah on the Moon is named after him.

== Biography ==
Giulio (Yoel) Racah was born in Florence, Italy. On his mother's side, Racah's family claimed to trace its ancestry in Italy back to the destruction of the Second Temple. He earned his Doctorate from the University of Florence in 1930, and continued his studies at Rome with Enrico Fermi.

In 1939, due to application of Anti-Jewish laws in Italy, Racah emigrated to the British Mandate of Palestine. In the 1948 Arab–Israeli War, Racah served as deputy commander of the Israeli forces defending Mount Scopus.

Racah died at the age of 56, apparently asphyxiated by gas from a faulty heater, while visiting Florence.

== Academic and scientific career ==
In 1937 Racah was appointed Professor of Physics at the University of Pisa. In 1939, after his move to Palestine, he was appointed Professor of Theoretical Physics at the Hebrew University of Jerusalem, He later became Dean of the Faculty of Sciences and finally Rector and acting president from 1961 to 1962, following Benjamin Mazar and succeeded by Eliahu Eilat. The physics institute at the Hebrew University is named "The Racah Institute of Physics".

Racah's research was mainly in the fields of quantum physics and atomic spectroscopy. He first devised a systematic general procedure for classifying the energy levels of open shell atoms, which remains to this day the accepted technique for practical calculations of atomic structure. This formalism was described in a monograph coauthored by his cousin Ugo Fano (Irreducible Tensorial Sets, 1959).

== Awards and recognition ==
In 1958, Racah was awarded the Israel Prize in exact sciences.

== See also ==
- Racah W-coefficient
- Racah parameter
- Racah polynomials
- Racah seniority number
- Racah Lectures in Physics
- List of Israel Prize recipients
- Science and technology in Israel
