= Lipskiy (crater) =

Crater on the Moon

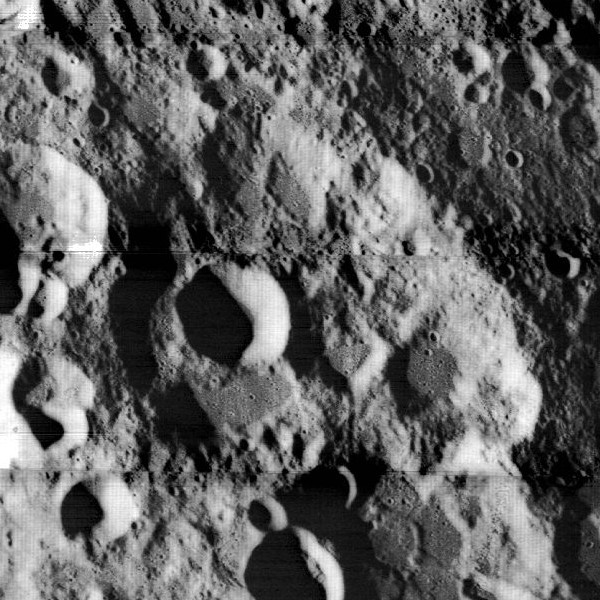
- Lunar Orbiter 2 image
- Coordinates: 2.2°S 179.5°E
- Diameter: 80 km
- Depth: Unknown/Variable
- Colongitude: 180° at sunrise
- Eponym: Yuriy N. Lipskiy

Lipskiy is a lunar impact crater on the far side of the Moon. It lies just to the south of the lunar equator, and is the closest named crater to the antipode of the Earth zenith point by 70 kilometers. That is, it lies in the region of the Moon that on average is the most distant from the Earth. Lipskiy is located less than one crater diameter to the north of the prominent crater Daedalus. To the northeast is Krasovskiy.

The crater has been heavily damaged and disrupted by subsequent impacts, leaving a formation that is scarcely recognizable as a crater. The rim and the interior are very irregular, and are overlain by several smaller impacts. The most notable of these are Lipskiy V along the northwestern edge and Lipskiy S is located just to the west of the midpoint.

== Satellite craters ==
By convention these features are identified on lunar maps by placing the letter on the side of the crater midpoint that is closest to Lipskiy.

Lipskiy	Latitude	Longitude	Diameter
S	2.2° S	179.9° W	23 km
V	1.2° S	178.7° E	36 km
X	0.4° N	178.9° E	24 km
