= De Vries (crater) =

Crater on the Moon

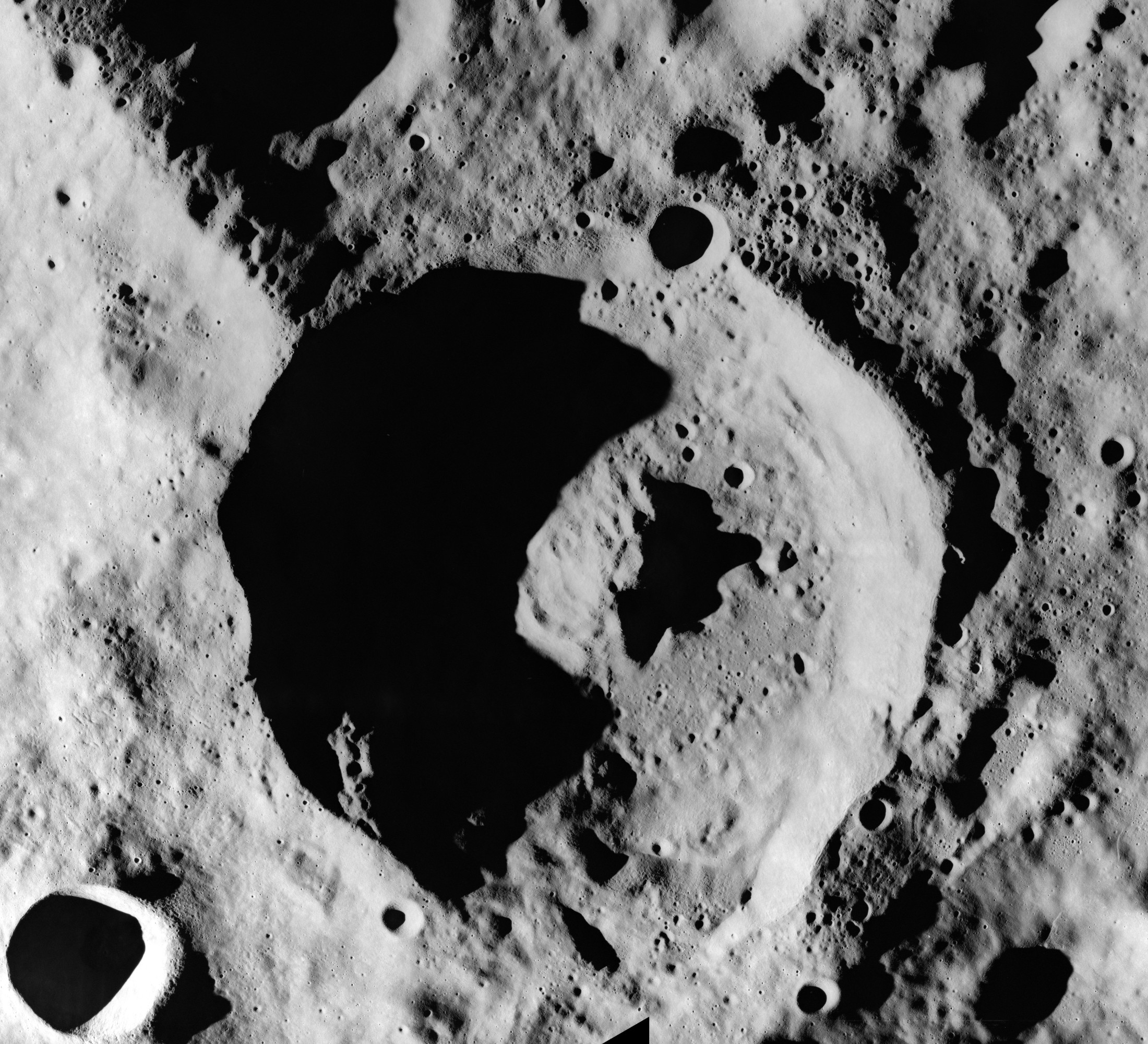
- Apollo 17 image
- Coordinates: 19.9°S 176.7°W
- Diameter: 57.51 km (35.74 mi)
- Depth: Unknown
- Colongitude: 177° at sunrise
- Formation: Upper Imbrian
- Eponym: Hugo de Vries

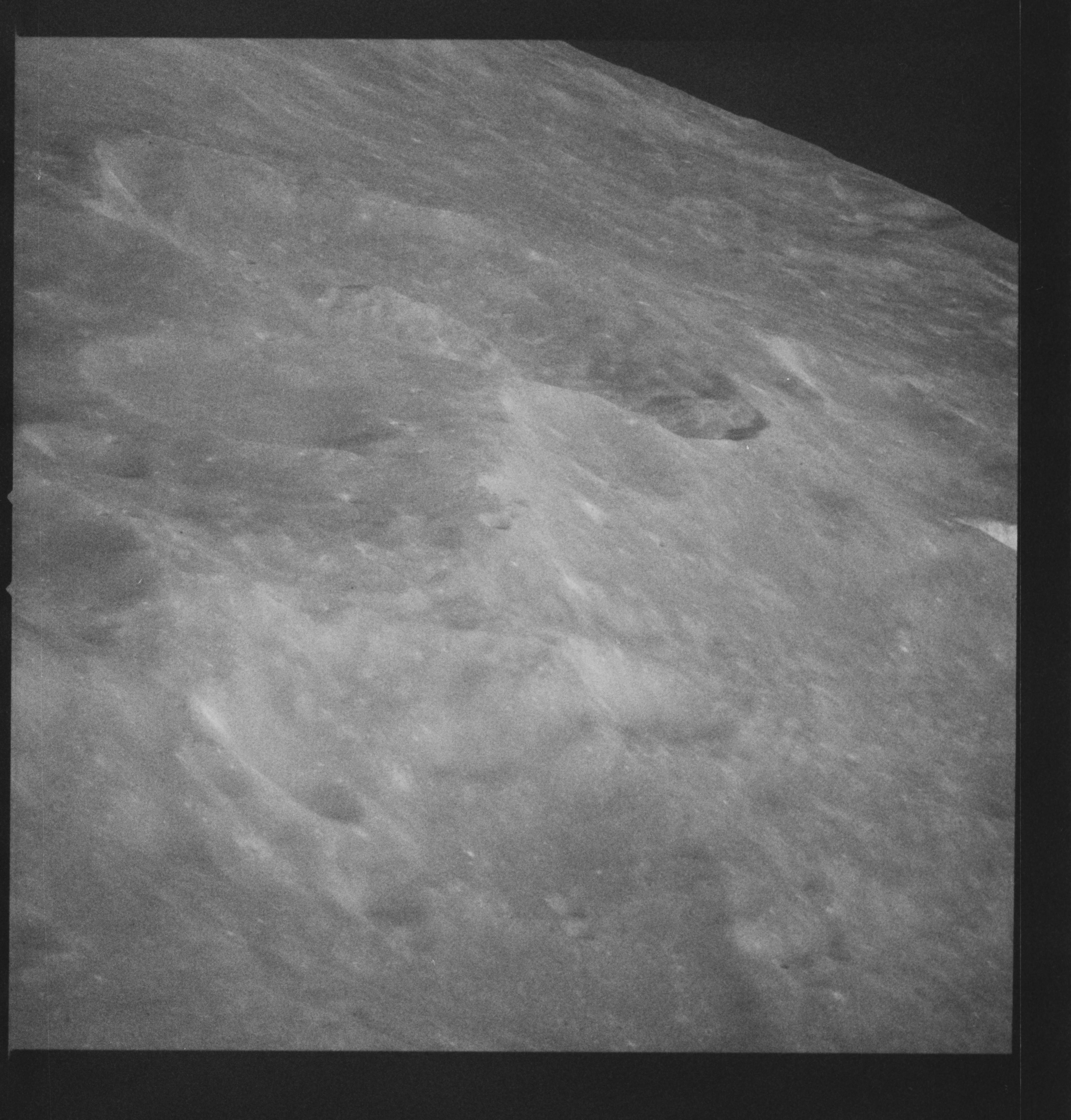
Oblique view facing southeast towards De Vries, from Apollo 8

De Vries is a lunar impact crater on the far side of the Moon relative to the Earth. It lies about midway between the craters Racah to the north-northwest and Orlov to the south-southeast. The walled plain designated Orlov Y lies between De Vries and Orlov, with the perimeter of this feature joining the two rims.

On the lunar geologic timescale, De Vries dates to the Upper Imbrian period. This crater is not significantly eroded, although a small crater is attached to the exterior of the northern rim. Within the somewhat interior floor is a broad central rise offset just to the northeast of the midpoint.

This formation is named after Dutch botanist Hugo de Vries (1848-1935). Its designation was officially adopted by the International Astronomical Union in 1970.

== Satellite craters ==
By convention these features are identified on lunar maps by placing the letter on the side of the crater midpoint that is closest to De Vries.

De Vries	Latitude	Longitude	Diameter
D	18.9° S	174.3° W	19 km
N	21.5° S	177.3° W	30 km
R	20.7° S	178.4° W	14 km
