= Racah seniority number =

The Racah seniority number (seniority quantum number) $\nu$ was introduced by Giulio Racah for the classification of electrons in an atomic configuration. The "seniority number", in a loose statement, is quantum number additional to the total angular momentum $L$ and total spin $S$, which gives the degree of unpaired particles.

A spin-independent interaction $\hat{V}$ is assumed with the property

$$\langle l^2;LM_L|\hat{V}|l^2;LM_L \rangle = g(2l+1)\delta_{L0}$$,

where $L$ is the combined angular momentum, $M_L$ magnetic quantum number, $l$ is electrons' orbital angular momenta, and $g$ is the dimensionless magnetic moment. The equation above shows there is no interaction unless the two electrons' orbital angular momenta are coupled to $L = 0$. The eigenvalue is the "seniority number" $\nu$.
