= DEEP-IN =

Type of spaceflight propulsion

DEEP-IN, also known as Directed Energy Propulsion for Interstellar Exploration, is a spaceflight propulsion concept that uses photonic laser propulsion with beamed power to propel a spacecraft in deep space. The concept was originally conceived by Professor Philip Lubin of the University of California Santa Barbara's Physics Department. Lubin is developing it under the NASA Innovative Advanced Concepts Program. DEEP-IN is notable as the first NASA-backed photonic laser propulsion concept. It is heavily derived from DE-STAR, a planetary defense satellite concept previously developed by Lubin, in which he proposes using directed energy from lasers to vaporize or knock off course destructive asteroids headed for Earth.

According to Lubin, the project aims to allow spacecraft to accelerate to a significant fraction of the speed of light. The system is scalable and modular, so that gradually larger objects can be propelled into space at relativistic speeds (speeds that are a significant fraction of the speed of light) with increasingly powerful lasers. Currently, research models suggest that using this technology, a satellite with a mass of 100 kilograms (220 lb) could reach Mars in 3 days, a significantly shorter time than the current transit time. Additionally, a more massive crewed spacecraft, such as the Orion spacecraft, could reach Mars in one month, compared to the traditional requirement of at least 5 months. However, News Ledge notes that this short transfer time would require a second array of lasers already existing on Mars to slow vehicles down for Mars orbital insertion.

== Technology ==
DEEP-IN would use an array of small lasers to focus a stream of photons onto reflectors on spacecraft, eliminating the need for spacecraft to carry propellant and therefore significantly lowering their mass. Photon momentum would be translated to the spacecraft, and reflectors enable a theoretical twofold increase in momentum transfer compared to a blackbody surface. The project anticipates it could carry femtosatellites weighing grams at approximately 0.25 times the speed of light, and still have significant maximum speed on larger spacecraft.

== Funding ==
Lubin has been furthering this concept under two grants to date from the NASA Institute for Advanced Concepts - a Phase 1 grant in 2015 of $100,000, and a Phase 2 grant in 2016 of US$500,000.
