= NASA Institute for Advanced Concepts =

NASA program

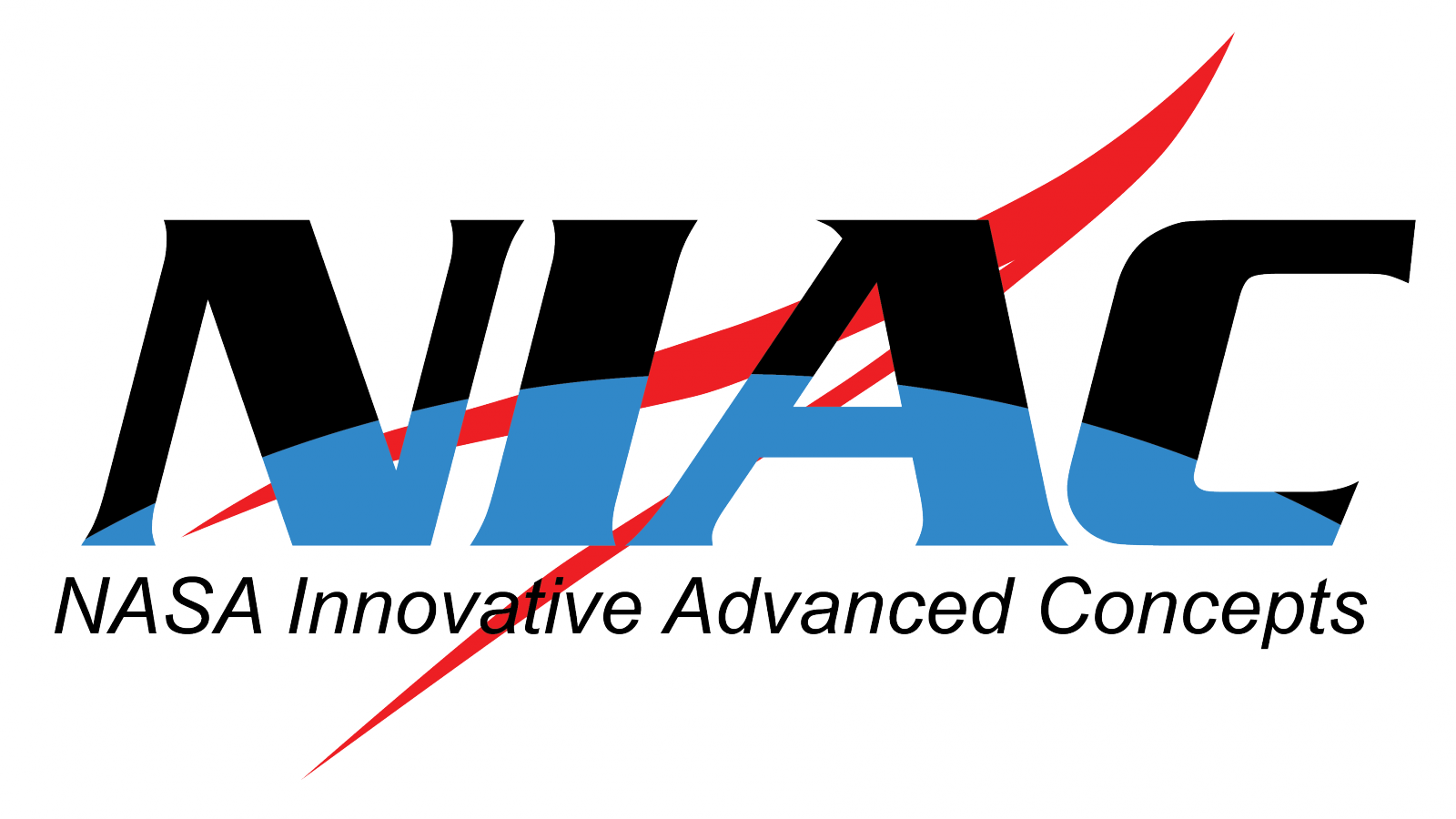
Logo of the NIAC

The NASA Innovative Advanced Concepts (NIAC), formerly NASA Institute for Advanced Concepts (NIAC), is a NASA program for development of far reaching, long term advanced concepts by "creating breakthroughs, radically better or entirely new aerospace concepts". It funds work on revolutionary aeronautics and space concepts that can dramatically impact how NASA develops and conducts its missions. The program operated under the name NASA Institute for Advanced Concepts from 1998 until 2007 (managed by the Universities Space Research Association on behalf of NASA), and was reestablished in 2011 under the name NASA Innovative Advanced Concepts and continues to the present.

== History ==
The NASA Institute for Advanced Concepts (NIAC) was a NASA-funded program that was operated by the Universities Space Research Association (USRA) for NASA from 1998 until its closure on 31 August 2007. NIAC was to serve as "an independent open forum, a high-level point of entry to NASA for an external community of innovators, and an external capability for analysis and definition of advanced aeronautics and space concepts to complement the advanced concept activities conducted within NASA."

NIAC sought proposals for revolutionary aeronautics and space concepts to dramatically impact how NASA developed and conducted its missions. NIAC provided a highly visible, recognizable, and high-level entry point for outside thinkers and researchers. It encouraged proposers to think decades into the future in pursuit of concepts that would "leapfrog" the evolution of contemporary aerospace systems. These concepts were expected to be based on sound scientific principles and attainable within a 10 to 40-year time frame.

NIAC received a total of 1,309 proposals and awarded 126 Phase I grants and 42 Phase II contracts for a total value of $27.3 million from February 1998 to 2007.

NASA announced on March 1, 2011 that the NIAC concept would be re-established at NASA with similar goals, maintaining the acronym NIAC.

=== NIAC 1998–2007 ===
Studies funded by the original NIAC 1998–2007 include

- Bio-Nano-Machines for Space Applications – Constantinos Mavroidis
- System Feasibility Demonstrations of Caves and Subsurface Constructs for Mars Habitation and Scientific Exploration (Caves of Mars Project) – Penelope J. Boston
- Lunar space elevator – Jerome Pearson – final report.pdf
- Magnetic sail – Robert Zubrin
- Mars Entomopter – Robert Michelson / Anthony Colozza – Phase II final report.pdf
- Mini-magnetospheric plasma propulsion – Robert M. Winglee
- Momentum exchange tether – Thomas J. Bogar – final report.pdf
- New Worlds Mission – Webster Cash
- Space elevator – Bradley C. Edwards

=== Closing of the original NIAC ===
On July 2, 2007, NIAC announced that "NASA, faced with the constraints of achieving the Vision for Space Exploration, has made the difficult decision to terminate NIAC, which has been funded by NASA since inception. Effective August 31, 2007, the original NIAC organization ceased operations.

== Revised NIAC ==
Following the termination of the original NIAC program, Congress requested a review of the NIAC program by the United States National Research Council (NRC) of the National Academy of Sciences. The review was done in 2009, and concluded that in order to achieve its mission, NASA needs "a mechanism to investigate visionary, far-reaching advanced concepts," and recommended that NIAC, or a NIAC-like program, should be reestablished. Consistent with this recommendation, it was announced on March 1, 2011 that the NIAC was to be revived with similar goals leading to the establishment in 2011 of a project within the NASA Office of Chief Technologist, the NASA Innovative Advanced Concepts, maintaining the acronym NIAC. It is now part of the NASA Space Technology Mission Directorate (STMD).

According to Michael Gazarik, director of NASA's Space Technology Program, "Through the NASA Innovative Advanced Concepts program, NASA is taking the long-term view of technological investment and the advancement that is essential for accomplishing our missions. We are inventing the ways in which next-generation aircraft and spacecraft will change the world and inspiring Americans to take bold steps."

=== 2011 NIAC Project Selections ===
The revived NIAC, with the slightly-changed name "NASA Innovative Advanced Concepts," funded thirty phase-I studies in 2011 to investigate advanced concepts.

- Duda, Kevin: Variable Vector Countermeasure Suit (V2Suit) for Space Habitation and Exploration
- Ferguson, Scott: Enabling All-Access Mobility for Planetary Exploration Vehicles via Transformative Reconfiguration
- Gilland, James: The Potential for Ambient Plasma Wave Propulsion
- Gregory, Daniel: Space Debris Elimination (SpaDE)
- Hogue, Michael: Regolith Derived Heat Shield for a Planetary Body Entry and Descent System with In-Situ Fabrication
- Hohman, Kurt: Atmospheric Breathing Electric Thruster for Planetary Exploration
- Howe, Steven: Economical Radioisotope Power
- Khoshnevis, Behrokh: Contour Crafting Simulation Plan for Lunar Settlement Infrastructure Build-Up
- Kwiat, Paul: Entanglement-assisted Communication System for NASA's Deep-Space Missions: Feasibility Test and Conceptual Design
- Mankins, John: SPS-ALPHA: The First Practical Solar Power Satellite via Arbitrarily Large PHased Array
- Miller, David: High-temperature Superconductors as Electromagnetic Deployment and Support Structures in Spacecraft
- Paul, Michael: Non-Radioisotope Power Systems For Sunless Solar System Exploration Missions
- Pavone, Marco: Spacecraft/Rover Hybrids for the Exploration of Small Solar System Bodies
- Ritter, Joe: Ultra-Light "Photonic Muscle" Space Structures
- Scott, Gregory: Low Power Microrobotics Utilizing Biologically Inspired Energy Generation
- Short, Kendra: Printable Spacecraft
- Sibille, Laurent: In-Space Propulsion Engine Architecture based on Sublimation of Planetary Resources: from exploration robots to NEO mitigation
- Silvera, Isaac: Metallic Hydrogen: A Game Changing Rocket Propellant
- Slough, John: Nuclear Propulsion through Direct Conversion of Fusion Energy
- Staehle, Robert: Interplanetary CubeSats: Opening the Solar System to a Broad Community at Lower Cost
- Strekalov, Dmitry: Ghost Imaging of Space Objects
- Stysley, Paul: Laser-Based Optical Trap for Remote Sampling of Interplanetary and Atmospheric Particulate Matter
- Swartzlander, Grover: Steering of Solar Sails Using Optical Lift Force
- Tarditi, Alfonso: Aneutronic Fusion Spacecraft Architecture
- Thibeault, Sheila: Radiation Shielding Materials Containing Hydrogen, Boron, and Nitrogen: Systematic Computational and Experimental Study
- Tripathi, Ram: Meeting the Grand Challenge of Protecting Astronaut's Health: Electrostatic Active Space Radiation Shielding for Deep Space Missions
- Werka, Robert: Proposal for a Concept Assessment of a Fission Fragment Rocket Engine (FFRE) Propelled Spacecraft
- Westover, Shayne: Radiation Protection and Architecture Utilizing High Temperature Superconducting Magnets
- Whittaker, William: Technologies Enabling Exploration of Skylights, Lava Tubes and Caves
- Wie, Bong: Optimal Dispersion of Near-Earth Objects

=== 2012 NIAC project selections ===
In August 2012, NIAC announced selection of 18 new phase-I proposals, along with Phase-II grants for continuation of 10 projects selected in earlier solicitations. These include many projects ranging from Landsailing rovers on Venus to schemes to explore under the ice of Europa. Phase I projects selected were:

- Agogino, Adrian: Super Ball Bot - Structures for Planetary Landing and Exploration
- Arrieta, Juan: The Regolith Biters: A Divide-And-Conquer Architecture for Sample-Return Missions
- Cohen, Marc: Robotic Asteroid Prospector (RAP) Staged from L-1: Start of the Deep Space Economy
- Ditto, Thomas: HOMES - Holographic Optical Method for Exoplanet Spectroscopy
- Flynn, Michael: Water Walls: Highly Reliable and Massively Redundant Life Support Architecture
- Gellett, Wayne: Solid State Air Purification System
- Hoyt, Robert: NanoTHOR: Low-Cost Launch of Nanosatellites to Deep Space
- Hoyt, Robert: SpiderFab: Process for On-Orbit Construction of Kilometer-Scale Apertures
- Kirtley, David: A Plasma Aerocapture and Entry System for Manned Missions and Planetary Deep Space Orbiters
- Landis, Geoffrey: Venus Landsailing Rover
- Lantoine, Gregory: MAGNETOUR: Surfing Planetary Systems on Electromagnetic and Multi-Body Gravity Fields
- McCue, Leigh: Exploration of Under-Ice Regions with Ocean Profiling Agents (EUROPA)
- Nosanov, Jeffrey: Solar System Escape Architecture for Revolutionary Science (SSEARS)
- Predina, Joseph: NIST in Space: Better Remote Sensors for Better Science
- Quadrelli, Marco: Orbiting Rainbows: Optical Manipulation of Aerosols and the Beginnings of Future Space Construction
- Saif, Babak: Atom Interferometry for detection of Gravity Waves-a
- Winglee, Robert: Sample Return Systems for Extreme Environments
- Zha, GeCheng: Silent and Efficient Supersonic Bi-Directional Flying Wing

=== 2013 NIAC project selections ===
In 2013 NIAC conducted a third solicitation for proposals, with projects to start in the summer of 2013. NASA selected 12 phase-I projects with a wide range of imaginative concepts, including 3D printing of biomaterials, such as arrays of cells; using galactic rays to map the insides of asteroids; and an "eternal flight" platform that could hover in Earth's atmosphere, potentially providing better imaging, Wi-Fi, power generation, and other applications. They selected 6 phase II projects, including photonic laser thrusters, extreme sample return, and innovative spherical robots designed for planetary exploration.

Phase I selections were:

- Adams, Rob: Pulsed Fission-Fusion (PuFF) Propulsion System
- Bradford, John: Torpor Inducing Transfer Habitat For Human Stasis To Mars
- Hemmati, Hamid: Two-Dimensional Planetary Surface Landers
- Jerred, Nathan: Dual-mode Propulsion System Enabling CubeSat Exploration of the Solar System
- Longman, Anthony: Growth Adapted Tensegrity Structures - A New Calculus for the Space Economy
- Moore, Mark: Eternal Flight as the Solution for 'X'
- Prettyman, Thomas: Deep Mapping of Small Solar System Bodies with Galactic Cosmic Ray Secondary Particle Showers
- Rothschild, Lynn: Biomaterials out of thin air: in situ, on-demand printing of advanced biocomposites
- Rovey, Joshua: Plasmonic Force Propulsion Revolutionizes Nano/PicoSatellite Capability
- Stoica, Adrian: Transformers For Extreme Environments

=== 2014 NIAC project selections ===
In 2014, NIAC conducted a fourth solicitation, and selected 12 projects for Phase-1 studies and 5 projects to continue on to phase II projects. Projects selected include a study of hibernation for astronauts and a submarine operating on Saturn's moon Titan

2014 Phase I selections were:

- Atchison, Justin: Swarm Flyby Gravimetry
- Boland, Eugene: Mars Ecopoiesis Test Bed
- Cash, Webster: The Aragoscope: Ultra-High Resolution Optics at Low Cost
- Chen, Bin: 3D Photocatalytic Air Processor for Dramatic Reduction of Life Support Mass & Complexity
- Hoyt, Robert: WRANGLER: Capture and De-Spin of Asteroids and Space Debris
- Matthies, Larry: Titan Aerial Daughtercraft
- Miller, Timothy: Using the Hottest Particles in the Universe to Probe Icy Solar System Worlds
- Nosanov, Jeffrey: PERISCOPE: PERIapsis Subsurface Cave OPtical Explorer
- Oleson, Steven: Titan Submarine: Exploring the Depths of Kraken
- Ono, Masahiro: Comet Hitchhiker: Harvesting Kinetic Energy from Small Bodies to Enable Fast and Low-Cost Deep Space Exploration
- Streetman, Brett: Exploration Architecture with Quantum Inertial Gravimetry and In Situ ChipSat Sensors
- Wiegmann, Bruce: Heliopause Electrostatic Rapid Transit System (HERTS)

=== 2015 NIAC project selections ===
The 2015 Phase-1 projects included a hopping vehicle to visit Triton and others, and seven phase two projects. Phase I projects selected were:

- Engblom, William: Virtual Flight Demonstration of Stratospheric Dual-Aircraft Platform
- Graf, John: Thirsty Walls - A new paradigm for air revitalization in life support
- Hecht, Michael: A Tall Ship and a Star to Steer Her By
- Lewis, John: In-Space Manufacture of Storable Propellants
- Lubin, Philip: Directed Energy Propulsion for Interstellar Exploration (DEEP-IN)
- Oleson, Steven: Triton Hopper: Exploring Neptune's Captured Kuiper Belt Object
- Peck, Mason: Soft-Robotic Rover with Electrodynamic Power Scavenging
- Plescia, Jeffrey: Seismic Exploration of Small Bodies
- Paxton, Larry: CRICKET: Cryogenic Reservoir Inventory by Cost-Effective Kinetically Enhanced Technology
- Sercel, Joel: APIS (Asteroid Provided In-Situ Supplies): 100MT Of Water from a Single Falcon 9
- Stoica, Adrian WindBots: persistent in-situ science explorers for gas giants
- Tabirian, Nelson: Thin-Film Broadband Large Area Imaging System
- Ulmer, Melville: Aperture: A Precise Extremely large Reflective Telescope Using Re-configurable Elements
- Wang, Joseph: CubeSat with Nanostructured Sensing Instrumentation for Planetary Exploration
- Youngquist, Robert: Cryogenic Selective Surfaces

In addition, seven projects were selected for continuation into Phase II:

- Atchison, Justin: Swarm Flyby Gravimetry
- Chen, Bin: 3D Photocatalytic Air Processor for Dramatic Reduction of Life Support Mass and Complexity
- Nosanov, Jeffrey: PERISCOPE: PERIapsis Subsurface Cave Optical Explorer
- Oleson, Steven: Titan Submarine: Exploring the Depths of Kraken Mare
- Paul, Michael: SCEPS in Space - Non-Radioisotope Power Systems for Sunless Solar System Exploration Missions
- Stoica, Adrian: Trans-Formers for Lunar Extreme Environments: Ensuring Long-Term Operations in Regions of Darkness and Low Temperatures
- Wiegmann, Bruce: Heliopause Electrostatic Rapid Transit System (HERTS)

=== 2016 NIAC project selections ===
Phase I projects selected were:

- Bayandor, Javid: Light Weight Multifunctional Planetary Probe for Extreme Environment Exploration and Locomotion
- Bugga, Ratnakumar: Venus Interior Probe Using In-situ Power and Propulsion (VIP-INSPR)
- Dunn, Jason: Reconstituting Asteroids into Mechanical Automata
- Hughes, Gary: Molecular Composition Analysis of Distant Targets
- Janson, Siegfried: Brane Craft
- Mann, Chris: Stellar Echo Imaging of Exoplanets
- Mueller, Robert: Mars Molniya Orbit Atmospheric Resource Mining
- Ono, Masahiro: Journey to the Center of Icy Moons
- Quadrelli, Marco: E-Glider: Active Electrostatic Flight for Airless Body Exploration
- Rothschild, Lynn: Urban biomining meets printable electronics: end-to-end destination biological recycling and reprinting
- Sauder, Jonathan: Automaton Rover for Extreme Environments (AREE)
- Thomas, Stephanie: Fusion-Enabled Pluto Orbiter and Lander
- VanWoerkom, Michael: NIMPH: Nano Icy Moons Propellant Harvester

In addition, eight projects were selected for continuation into Phase II:

- Bradford, John: Advancing Torpor Inducing Transfer Habitats for Human Stasis to Mars
- Engblom, William: Flight Demonstration of Novel Atmospheric Satellite Concept
- Kirtley, David: Magnetoshell Aerocapture for Manned Missions and Planetary Deep Space Orbiters
- Lubin, Philip: Directed Energy for Interstellar Study
- Rovey, Joshua: Experimental Demonstration and System Analysis for Plasmonic Force Propulsion
- Skelton, Robert: Tensegrity Approaches to In-Space Construction of a 1g Growable Habitat
- Ulmer, Melville: Further Development of Aperture: A Precise Extremely Large Reflective Telescope Using Re-configurable Elements
- Youngquist, Robert: Cryogenic Selective Surfaces

=== 2017 NIAC project selections ===
The fifteen projects selected for Phase I were:

- Adam Arkin: A Synthetic Biology Architecture to Detoxify and Enrich Mars Soil for Agriculture
- John Brophy: A Breakthrough Propulsion Architecture for Interstellar Precursor Missions
- John-Paul Clarke : Evacuated Airship for Mars Missions
- Heidi Fearn: Mach Effects for In Space Propulsion: Interstellar Mission
- Benjamin Goldman : Pluto Hop, Skip, and Jump Global
- Jason Gruber: Turbolift
- Kevin Kempton : Phobos L1 Operational Tether Experiment (PHLOTE)
- Michael LaPointe: Gradient Field Imploding Liner Fusion Propulsion System
- John Lewis : Massively Expanded NEA Accessibility via Microwave-Sintered Aerobrakes
- Jay McMahon: Dismantling Rubble Pile Asteroids with AoES (Area-of-Effect Soft-bots)
- Raymond Sedwick: Continuous Electrode Inertial Electrostatic Confinement Fusion
- Joel Sercel: Sutter: Breakthrough Telescope Innovation for Asteroid Survey Missions to Start a Gold Rush in Space
- Slava Turyshev: Direct Multipixel Imaging and Spectroscopy of an exoplanet with a Solar Gravity Lens Mission
- Robert Youngquist: Solar Surfing
- Nan Yu: A direct probe of dark energy interactions with a solar system laboratory

In addition, seven projects were selected for continuation into Phase II:

- Ratnakumar Bugga: Venus Interior Probe Using In-situ Power and Propulsion (VIP-INSPR)
- Gary Hughes: Remote Laser Evaporative Molecular Absorption Spectroscopy Sensor System
- Siegfried Janson: Brane Craft Phase II
- Chris Mann: Stellar Echo Imaging of Exoplanets
- Jonathan Sauder: Automaton Rover for Extreme Environments (AREE)
- Joel Sercel: Optical Mining of Asteroids, Moons, and Planets to Enable Sustainable Human Exploration and Space Industrialization
- Stephanie Thomas: Fusion-Enabled Pluto Orbiter and Lander

=== 2018 NIAC project selections ===
The sixteen projects selected for Phase I were:

- Aliakbar Aghamohammadi: Shapeshifters from Science Fiction to Science Fact: Globetrotting from Titan's Rugged Cliffs to its Deep Seafloors
- David Akin: Biobot: Innovative Offloading of Astronauts for More Effective Exploration
- Jeffrey Balcerski: Lofted Environmental and Atmospheric Venus Sensors (LEAVES)
- Sigrid Close: Meteoroid Impact Detection for Exploration of Asteroids (MIDEA)
- Christine Hartzell: On-Orbit, Collision-Free Mapping of Small Orbital Debris
- Chang-kwon Kang: Marsbee - Swarm of Flapping Wing Flyers for Enhanced Mars Exploration
- John Kendra: Rotary Motion Extended Array Synthesis (R-MXAS)
- Chris Limbach: PROCSIMA: Diffractionless Beamed Propulsion for Breakthrough Interstellar Missions
- Gareth Meirion-Griffith: SPARROW: Steam Propelled Autonomous Retrieval Robot for Ocean Worlds
- Hari Nayar: BALLET: BALloon Locomotion for Extreme Terrain
- Lynn Rothschild: Myco-architecture off planet: growing surface structures at destination
- Dmitry Savransky: Modular Active Self-Assembling Space Telescope Swarms
- Nickolas Solomey: Astrophysics and Technical Study of a Solar Neutrino Spacecraft
- Grover Swartzlander: Advanced Diffractive MetaFilm Sailcraft
- Jordan Wachs: Spectrally-Resolved Synthetic Imaging Interferometer
- Ryan Weed: Radioisotope Positron Propulsion

In addition, nine projects were selected for continuation into Phase II:

- Robert Adams: Pulsed Fission-Fusion (PuFF) Propulsion Concept
- John Brophy: A Breakthrough Propulsion Architecture for Interstellar Precursor Missions
- Devon Crowe: Kilometer Space Telescope (KST)
- Jay McMahon: Dismantling Rubble Pile Asteroids with AoES (Area-of-Effect Soft-bots)
- Steven Oleson: Triton Hopper: Exploring Neptune's Captured Kuiper Belt Object
- John Slough: Spacecraft Scale Magnetospheric Protection from Galactic Cosmic Radiation
- Slava Turyshev: Direct Multipixel Imaging and Spectroscopy of an Exoplanet with a Solar Gravity Lens Mission
- Michael VanWoerkom: NIMPH: Nano Icy Moons Propellant Harvester
- James Woodward: Mach Effect for In Space Propulsion: Interstellar Mission

=== 2019 NIAC project selections ===
The twelve projects selected for Phase I were:

- Javid Bayandor: BREEZE- Bioinspired Ray for Extreme Environments and Zonal Exploration
- Erik Brandon: Power Beaming for Long Life Venus Surface Missions
- Ana Diaz Artiles: SmartSuit: A Hybrid, Intelligent, and Highly Mobile EVA Spacesuit for Next Generation Exploration Missions
- Tom Ditto: Dual Use Exoplanet Telescope (DUET)
- Yu Gu: Micro-Probes Propelled and Powered by Planetary Atmospheric Electricity (MP4AE)
- Troy Howe: SPEAR Probe - An Ultra Lightweight Nuclear Electric Propulsion Probe for Deep Space Exploration
- Noam Izenberg: RIPS: Ripcord Innovative Power System
- Geoffrey Landis: Power for Interstellar Fly-by
- Joel Sercel: Lunar-Polar Propellant Mining Outpost (LPMO): Affordable Exploration and Industrialization
- John Slough: Crosscutting High Apogee Refueling Orbital Navigator (CHARON) for Active Debris Removal
- George Sowers: Thermal Mining of Ices on Cold Solar System Bodies
- Robert Staehle: Low-Cost SmallSats to Explore to Our Solar System's Boundaries

In addition, six projects were selected for continuation into Phase II:

- Tom Ditto: The High Étendue Multiple Object Spectrographic Telescope (THE MOST)
- John Kendra: Rotary-Motion-Extended Array Synthesis (R-MXAS)
- Chris Limbach: Self-Guided Beamed Propulsion for Breakthrough Interstellar Missions
- Nickolas Solomey: Astrophysics and Technical Lab Studies of a Solar Neutrino Spacecraft Detector
- Grover Swartzlander: Diffractive Lightsails
- Doug Willard: Solar Surfing

Also, two projects were selected for Phase III:

- William Whittaker: Robotic Technologies Enabling the Exploration of Lunar Pits
- Joel Sercel: Mini Bee Prototype to Demonstrate the Apis Mission Architecture and Optical Mining Technology

=== 2020 NIAC project selections ===
The sixteen projects selected for Phase I were:

- Saptarshi Bandyopadhyay: LCRT - Lunar Crater Radio Telescope on the Far-Side of the Moon
- John Christian: StarNAV: An Architecture for Autonomous Spacecraft Navigation by the Relativistic Perturbation of Starlight
- Artur Davoyan: Extreme Metamaterial Solar Sails for Breakthrough Space Exploration
- Caroline Genzale: Fueling a Human Mission to Mars
- Davide Guzzetti: Flat Fabrication of Progressively Self-Assembling Space Systems
- Benjamin Hockman: Gravity Poppers: Hopping Probes for the Interior Mapping of Small Solar System Bodies
- Steven Howe: Pulsed Plasma Rocket: Shielded, Fast Transits for Humans to Mars
- Troy Howe: High Irradiance Peltier Operated Tungsten Exo-Reflector (HI-POWER)
- Gerald Jackson: Deceleration of Interstellar Spacecraft Utilizing Antimatter
- Matthew Kuhns: Instant Landing Pads for Artemis Lunar Missions
- Richard Linares: Dynamic Orbital Slingshot for Rendezvous with Interstellar Objects
- Philip Metzger: Aqua Factorem: Ultra Low-Energy Lunar Water Extraction
- Robert Moses: Advanced Aerocapture System for Enabling Faster-Larger Planetary Science & Human Exploration Missions
- Eldar Noe Dobrea: Heat Exchange-Driven Aircraft for Low Altitude and Surface Exploration of Venus
- Robert Romanofsky: Magneto-Inductive Communications for Ocean Worlds
- Lynn Rothschild: An Astropharmacy

In addition, six projects were selected for continuation into Phase II:

- David Akin: Innovative Offloading of Astronauts for More Effective Exploration
- Javid Bayandor: Lightweight Multifunctional Planetary Probe for Extreme Environment Exploration and Locomotion
- Troy Howe: SPEAR Probe - An Ultra Lightweight Nuclear Electric Propulsion Probe for Deep Space Exploration
- Masahiro Ono: Enceladus Vent Explorer
- Joel Sercel: Lunar Polar Propellant Mining Outpost (LPMO): A Breakthrough for Lunar Exploration & Industry
- Nan Yu: Gravity Observation and Dark Energy Detection Explorer in the Solar System

Also, one project was selected for continuation into Phase III:

- Slava Turyshev: Direct Multipixel Imaging and Spectroscopy of an Exoplanet with a Solar Gravitational Lens Mission

=== 2021 NIAC project selections ===
The sixteen projects selected for Phase I were:

- Sarbajit Banerjee: Regolith Adaptive Modification System (RAMs) to Support Early Extraterrestrial Planetary Landings (and Operations)
- Sigrid Close: Exploring Uranus through SCATTER: Sustained ChipSat/CubeSat Activity Through Transmitted Electromagnetic Radiation
- Amelia Greig: Ablative Arc Mining for In-Situ Resource Utilization
- Zachary Manchester: Kilometer-Scale Space Structures from a Single Launch
- Patrick McGarey: PEDALS: Passively Expanding Dipole Array for Lunar Sounding
- Quinn Morley: Autonomous Robotic Demonstrator for Deep Drilling (ARD3)
- Christopher Morrison: Extrasolar Object Interceptor and Sample Return Enabled by Compact, Ultra Power Dense Radioisotope Batteries
- E. Joseph Nemanick: Atomic Planar Power for Lightweight Exploration (APPLE)
- Steven Oleson: A Titan Sample Return Using In-Situ Propellants
- Marco Pavone: ReachBot: Small Robot for Large Mobile Manipulation Tasks in Martian Cave Environments
- Ronald Polidan: FarView – An In Situ Manufactured Lunar Far Side Radio Observatory
- Ethan Schaler: FLOAT — Flexible Levitation on a Track
- Ethan Schaler: SWIM — Sensing with Independent Micro-swimmers
- Jane Shevtsov: Making Soil for Space Habitats by Seeding Asteroids with Fungi
- Charles Taylor: Light Bender
- Joshua Vander Hook: Solar System Pony Express

In addition, six projects were selected for continuation into Phase II:

- Saptarshi Bandyopadhyay: LCRT - Lunar Crater Radio Telescope on the Far-Side of the Moon
- Lynn Rothschild: Mycotecture Off Planet
- Kerry Nock: Pluto Hop, Skip, and Jump
- Artur Davoyan: Extreme Solar Sailing for Breakthrough Space Exploration
- Jeffrey Balcerski: Lofted Environmental Venus Sensors (LEAVES)
- Peter Gural: Sutter Ultra: Breakthrough Space Telescope for Prospecting Asteroids

Also, one project was selected for continuation into Phase III:

- Nickolas Solomey: Cube-Sat Space Flight Test of a Neutrino Detector

=== 2022 NIAC project selections ===
The twelve projects selected for Phase I were:

- Darmindra Arumugam: Cryospheric Rydberg Radar
- Steven Barrett: Silent, Solid-State Propulsion for Advanced Air Mobility Vehicles
- Jason Benkoski: Combined Heat Shield and Solar Thermal Propulsion System for an Oberth maneuver
- Elena D’Onghia: CREW HaT: Cosmic Radiation Extended Warding using the Halbach Torus
- Bonnie Dunbar: The Spacesuit Digital Thread: 4.0 Manufacture of Custom High Performance Spacesuits for the Exploration of Mars
- Ivan Ermanoski: Breathing Mars Air: Stationary and Portable O2 Generation
- Philip Lubin: Pi – Terminal Defense for Humanity
- John Mather: Hybrid Observatory for Earth-like Exoplanets (HOEE)
- Marcin Pilinski: In-situ Neutral-Optics Velocity Analyzer for Thermospheric Exploration (INOVATE)
- Jonathan Sauder: Starburst: A Revolutionary Under-Constrained Adaptable Deployable Structure Architecture
- Sara Seager: Venus Atmosphere and Cloud Particle Sample Return for Astrobiology
- Mahmooda Sultana: SCOPE: ScienceCraft for Outer Planet Exploration

In addition, five projects were selected for continuation into Phase II:

- Javid Bayandor: BREEZE- Bioinspired Ray for Extreme Environments and Zonal Exploration
- Zac Manchester: Kilometer-Scale Space Structures from a Single Launch
- E Nemanick: Atomic Planar Power for Lightweight Exploration (APPLE)
- Marco Pavone: ReachBot: Small Robot for Large Mobile Manipulation Tasks in Martian Cave Environments
- Ethan Schaler: SWIM- Sensing with Independent Micro-swimmers

Also, one project was selected for continuation into Phase III:

- Amber Dubill: Diffractive Solar Sailing

=== 2023 NIAC Project Selections ===
The fourteen projects selected for Phase I were:

- Edward Balaban: Fluidic Telescope (FLUTE): Enabling the Next Generation of Large Space Observatories
- Igor Bargatin: Photophoretic Propulsion Enabling Mesosphere Exploration
- Theresa Benyo: Accessing Icy World Oceans Using Lattice Confinement Fusion Fast Fission
- Zachary Cordero: Bend-Forming of Large Electrostatically Actuated Space Structures
- Peter Curreri: Lunar South Pole Oxygen Pipeline
- Artur Davoyan: Pellet-Beam Propulsion for Breakthrough Space Exploration
- Ryan Gosse: New Class of Bimodal NTP/NEP with a Wave Rotor Topping Cycle Enabling Fast Transit to Mars
- Congrui Jin: Biomineralization-Enabled Self-Growing Building Blocks for Habitat Outfitting on Mars
- Mary Knapp: Great Observatory for Long Wavelengths (GO-LoW)
- Quinn Morley: TitanAir: Leading-Edge Liquid Collection to Enable Cutting-Edge Science
- Christopher Morrison: EmberCore Flashlight: Long Distance Lunar Characterization with Intense Passive X- and Gamma-ray Source
- Heidi Newberg: Diffractive Interfero Coronagraph Exoplanet Resolver (DICER): Detecting and Characterizing All Earth-Like Exoplanets Orbiting Sun-Like Stars Within 10 pc
- Stephen Polly: Radioisotope Thermoradiative Cell Power Generator
- Ryan Weed: Aerogel Core Fission Fragment Rocket Engine

In addition, six projects were selected for continuation into Phase II:

- Darmindra Arumugam: Quantum Rydberg Radar for Surface, Topography, and Vegetation
- Steven Barrett: Silent, Solid-State Propulsion for Advanced Air Mobility Vehicles
- Philip Lubin: PI – Planetary Defense
- Christopher Morrison: The Nyx Mission to Observe the Universe from Deep Space – Enabled by EmberCore, a High Specific Power RadioisotopeElectric Propulsion System
- Ronald Polidan: FarView Observatory – A Large, In-Situ Manufactured, Lunar Far Side Radio Array
- Lynn Rothschild: A Flexible, Personalized, On-Demand Astropharmacy

No projects were selected for continuation into Phase III.

=== 2024 NIAC project selections ===
The thirteen projects selected for Phase I were:

- Matthew McQuinn: Solar System-Scale VLBI to Dramatically Improve Cosmological Distance Measurements
- Kenneth Carpenter: A Lunar Long-Baseline Optical Imaging Interferometer: Artemis-enabled Stellar Imager (AeSI)
- Alvaro Romero-Calvo: Magnetohydrodynamic Drive for Hydrogen and Oxygen Production in Mars Transfer
- James Bickford: Thin Film Isotope Nuclear Engine Rocket (TFINER)
- Ge-Cheng Zha: Mars Aerial and Ground Global Intelligent Explorer (MAGGIE)
- Steven Benner: Add-on to Large-scale Water Mining Operations on Mars to Screen for Introduced and Alien Life
- Lynn Rothschild: Detoxifying Mars: The Biocatalytic Elimination of Omnipresent Perchlorates
- Thomas Eubanks: Swarming Proxima Centauri: Coherent Picospacecraft Swarms Over Interstellar Distances
- Beijia Zhang: LIFA: Lightweight Fiber-based Antenna for Small Sat-Compatible Radiometry
- Ryan Sprenger: A Revolutionary Approach to Interplanetary Space Travel: Studying Torpor in Animals for Space-health in Humans (STASH)
- Geoffrey Landis: Sample Return from the Surface of Venus
- Peter Cabauy: Autonomous Tritium Micropowered Sensors
- Aaswath Pattabhi Raman: Electro-luminescently Cooled Zero-boil-off Propellant Depots Enabling Crewed Exploration of Mars

== See also ==
- Advanced Concepts Team
- Advanced Propulsion Physics Laboratory
